= List of liqueur brands =

List of liqueurs, a type of alcoholic drinks

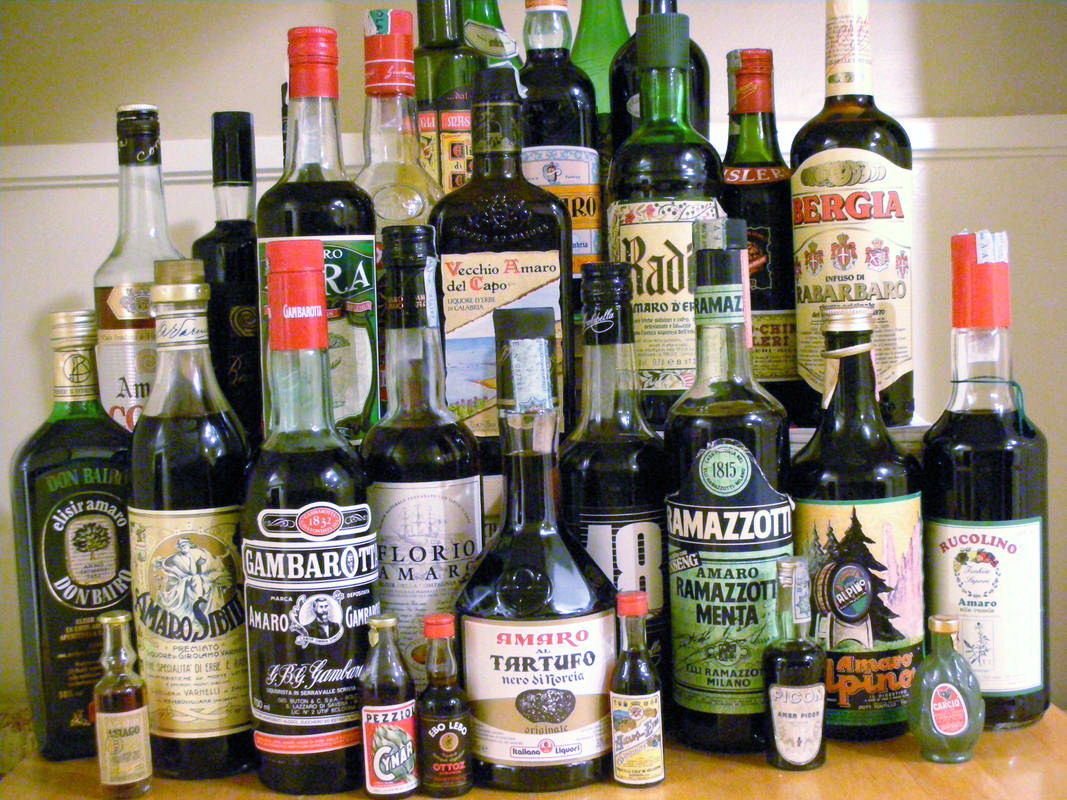
A selection of amaro liqueurs from Italy

Liqueurs are alcoholic beverages that are bottled with added sugar and have added flavours that are usually derived from fruits, herbs, or nuts. Liqueurs are distinct from eaux-de-vie, fruit brandy, and flavored liquors, which contain no added sugar. Most liqueurs range between 15% and 55% alcohol by volume.

== Chocolate liqueurs ==
There are three types of chocolate liqueur: liqueur, cream liqueur, and crème de cacao.

=== Chocolate liqueur ===
- Afrikoko (coconut and chocolate)
- Ashanti Gold
- Bicerin Di Giandujotto (chocolate and hazelnut)
- Godiva Dark Chocolate
- Intramuros Liqueur de Cacao
- Liqueur Fogg
- Mozart Black (dark chocolate)
- OM Dark Chocolate & Sea Salt Liqueur
- Royal Mint-Chocolate Liqueur (French)
- Sabra liqueur (dark chocolate and Jaffa oranges)
- Thornton's Chocolate Liqueur
- Mon Chéri

=== Chocolate cream liqueur ===
- Cadbury Cream Liqueur
- Dooley's White Chocolate Cream Liqueur
- Dorda Double Chocolate Liqueur
- Dwersteg's Organic Chocolate Cream Liqueur
- Godiva White Chocolate
- Hotel Chocolat Velvetised Chocolate Cream
- Florcello Chocolate Orange Cream Liqueur
- Mozart Gold Chocolate Cream Liqueur
- Mozart White Chocolate Cream Liqueur
- Vana Tallinn Chocolate Cream
- Vermeer Dutch Chocolate Cream Liqueur

=== Crème de cacao ===
Crème de cacao may be either clear or a dark caramel color, which is often labeled dark crème de cacao. The French word crème identifies it as a crème liqueur, a liqueur with a high sugar content as stipulated by various regulations (for example, European law requires a sugar content of 250 g/L). There is no dairy cream in it.

White crème de cacao is a clear, sweet liqueur that has a clearer and a more delicate chocolate flavor than the darker variant. The difference lies majorly on the production methods and coloring: white crème de cacao is flavored with distillate cacao beans while the dark version is gotten by retaining the natural coloring of the cacao beans. Vanilla is commonly added to enhance aroma and sweetness.

The alcohol content of crème de cacao varies, but 20–25% ABV (40–50 proof (U.S.)) is common.

== Coffee liqueurs ==
A coffee liqueur is a caffeinated alcoholic drink with a coffee flavour.

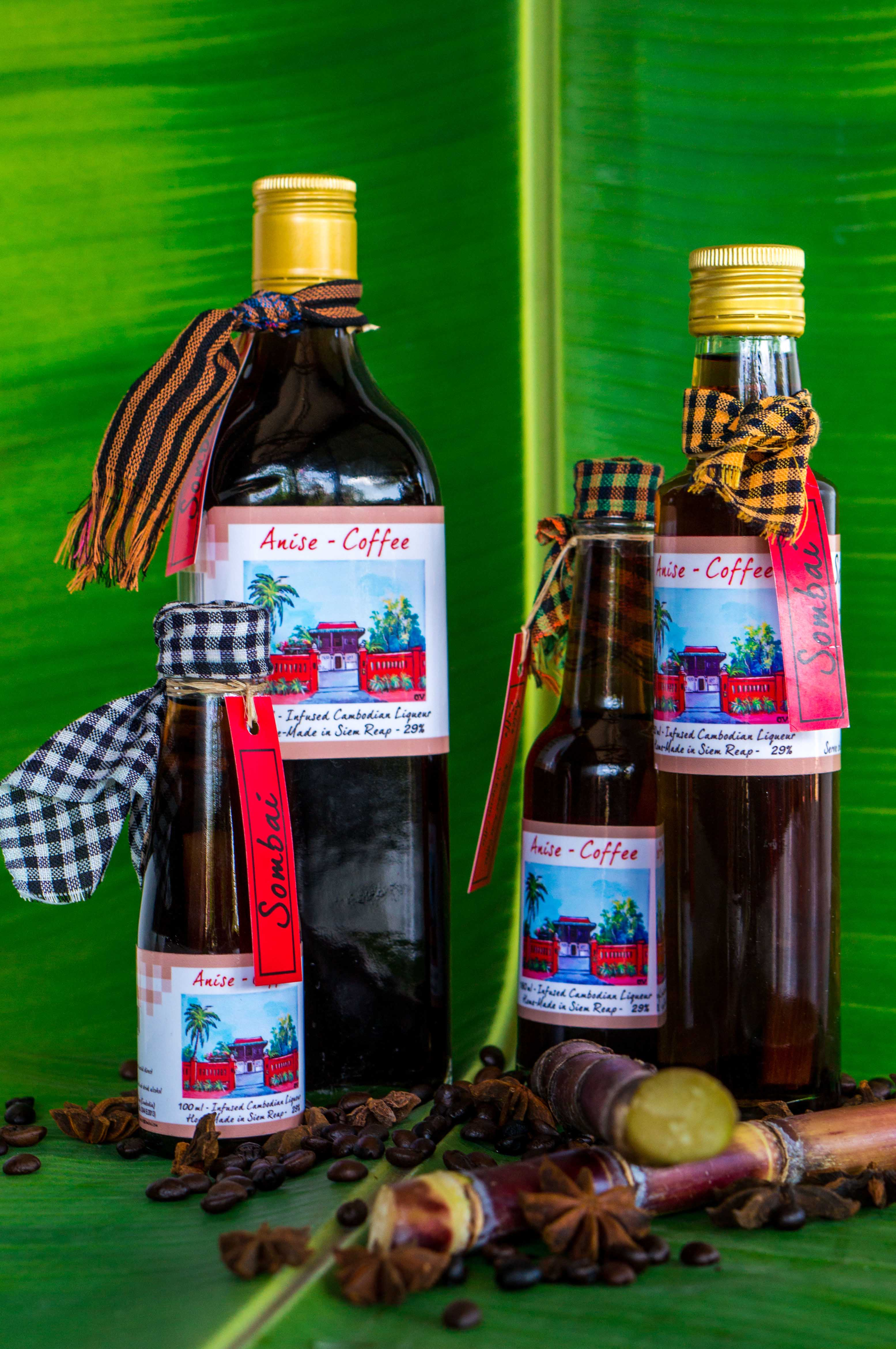
Bottles of Sombai Anise & Coffee rice liqueur

- Allen's Coffee Brandy
- Amaro 1716 Café du Soir
- Black Canyon Distillery, Richardo's Decaf Coffee Liqueur
- Café Rica – a Costa Rican coffee liqueur
- Caffè Borghetti – an Italian coffee liqueur
- Cazcabel – Mexican coffee liqueur
- Kahlúa – a Mexican coffee liqueur
- Kamok, a French coffee liqueur
- Kamora, a Mexican coffee liqueur
- Kavalan Distillery Sweet coffee liqueur
- Kapali Coffee Liqueur
- Liqueurious Coffea Coffee Liqueur
- Liqueurious Coffea Decaf Coffee Liqueur
- Licor de café – a Galician coffee liqueur
- Midnight Espresso Regular Coffee Liqueur
- Midnight Espresso Decaf Coffee Liqueur
- Mr Black Cold Brew Coffee Liqueur
- Mr Black Cold Brew Coffee Amaro
- Norse Code – a Yorkshire coffee liqueur produced by Coffee Spirit Co.
- Patrón XO Cafe
- Sabroso – a Mexican coffee liqueur
- Sheridan's – an Irish coffee liqueur
- Sombai Anise & Coffee rice liqueur
- Flor de Caña Spresso – a Nicaraguan coffee liqueur
- San Andre (Goa)
- St. George Spirits NOLA Coffee Liqueur
- Tia Maria
- Toussaint Coffee Liqueur – a Haitian coffee liqueur
- B52 Coffee Liqueur

== Cream liqueurs ==
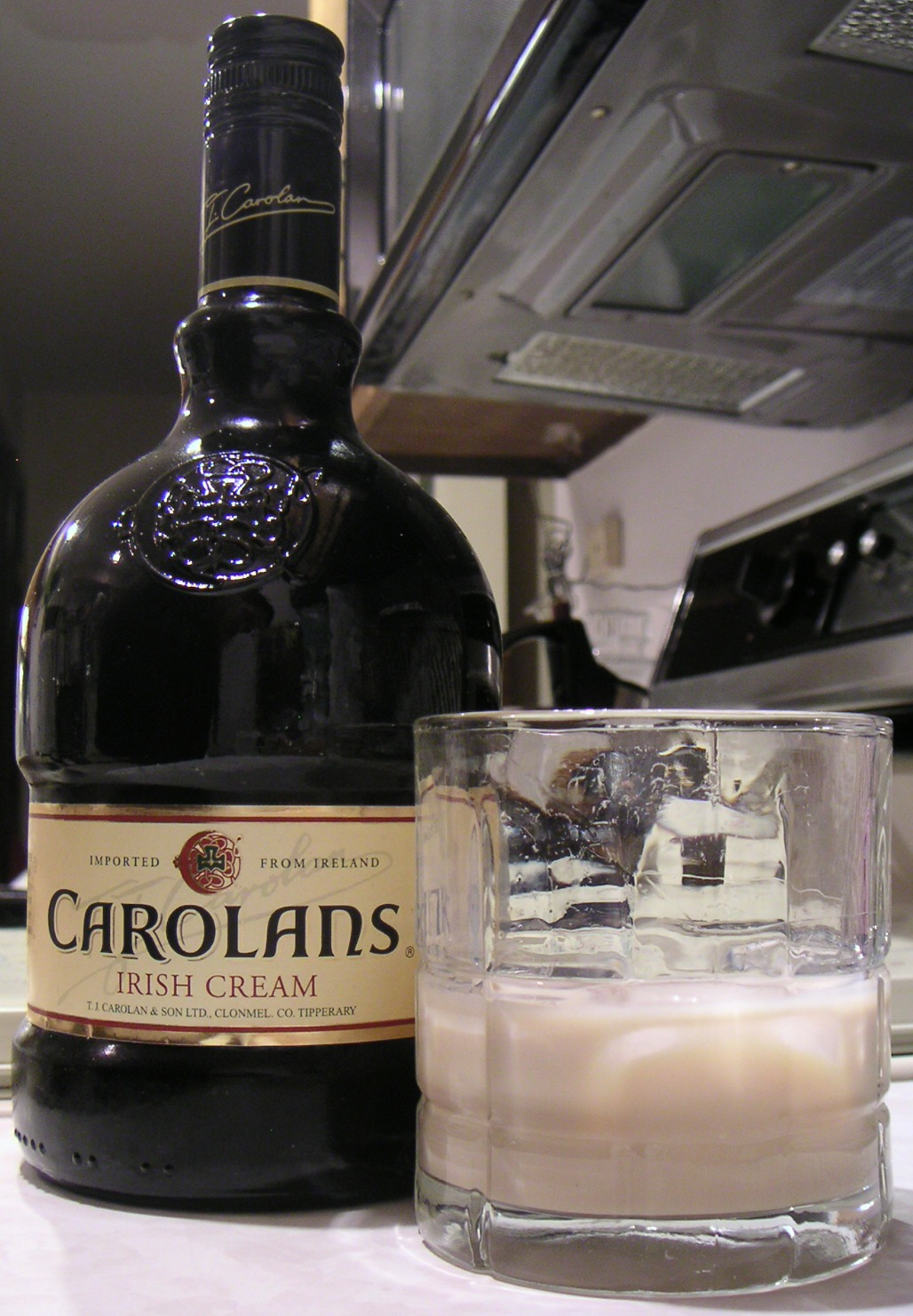
A bottle and glass of Carolans

- Advocaat
- Amarula (sugar, cream, and the fruit of the African marula tree Origin: South Africa)
- Baileys Irish Cream
- Coole Swan Irish Cream Liqueur
- Carolans Irish Cream
- Crema Fina
- Cruzan Rum Cream
- Dooley's
- DV8 Gold
- DV8 Pink Gin
- Heather Cream (Scottish cream liqueur – discontinued)
- Kerrygold Irish Cream Liqueur
- Malibu (rum)
- Ponche crema
- Rompope
- RumChata
- Sangster's
- Saint Brendan's Irish Cream Liqueur
- Tequila Rose
- Vana Tallinn Cream
- Vermeer Dutch Chocolate Cream Liqueur
- Vodkow Cream Liqueur
- Voodoo Cream Liqueur

== Crème liqueurs ==
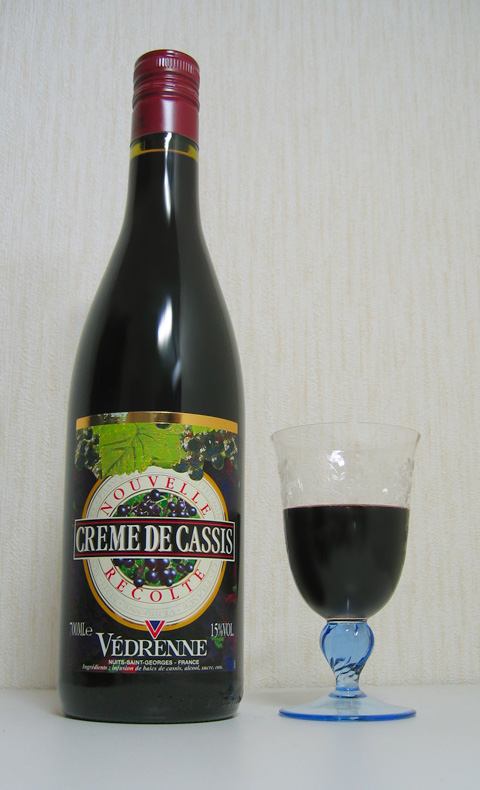
A bottle and glass of Crème de cassis

- Crème de banane – Banana
- Crème de cacao – Cocoa or chocolate
- Crème de cassis – Blackcurrant
- Crème de Cerise – Sour cherry
- Crème de menthe – Peppermint or Corsican mint
- Crème de Noyaux – Almond, apricot kernel, or peach kernel
- Creme de violette – Violet
- Creme Yvette – Violet, fruit, and others
- Parfait d'Amour – Varies by maker, typically flowers with citrus

== Flower liqueurs ==
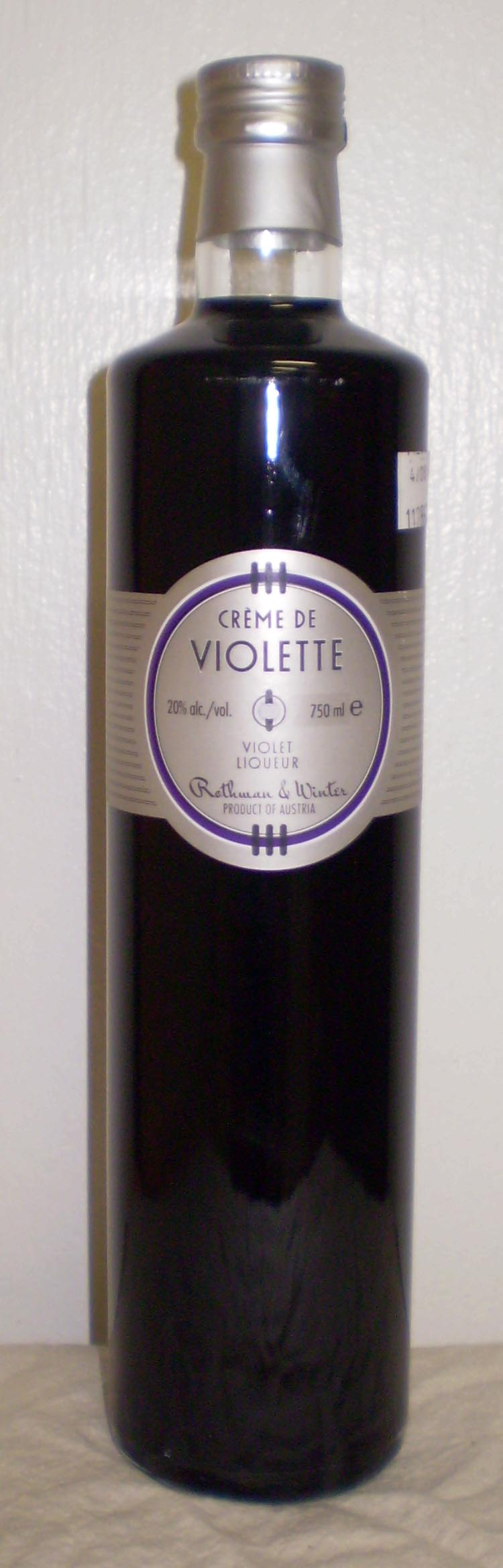
A bottle of Crème de Violette

- Crème de violette (violet)
- Creme Yvette (violet, vanilla)
- Rosolio (various)
- Italicus
- St-Germain (elderflower)

== Fruit liqueurs ==
=== Berry liqueurs ===
- Chambord (raspberry)
- Crème de cassis (blackcurrant)
- Guavaberry
- Hideous (raspberries, other berries and citrus fruits)
- Lakka (cloudberry)
- Lillehammer (lingonberry)
- Mirto (Sardinian traditional bitterish liqueur made with myrtle, used as digestive drink at the end of meals)
- Mouse Kingdom Liqueurs (raspberry and blackcurrant)
- Murtado (ugniberry)
- XUXU (strawberry)
- Og natura Stone Bramble Liqueur (stone bramble)

=== Cherry liqueurs ===
- Cherry Heering (cherry)
- Ginjinha (sour cherry)
- Guignolet (wild cherry)
- Maraschino (cherry)
- Vișinată (sour cherry)

=== Orange liqueurs ===
- Aurum (rum, tea, and tangerines)
- Cointreau (orange)
- Controy
- Curaçao (bitter orange)
- Garluche (bitter orange peel)
- Grand Marnier (orange)
- GranGala (orange)
- Hesperidina (bitter orange with mint and other herbs)
- Mandarine Napoléon (Mandarin orange)
- Triple sec (orange)
- Van Der Hum (tangerine and from South Africa)

=== Other ===
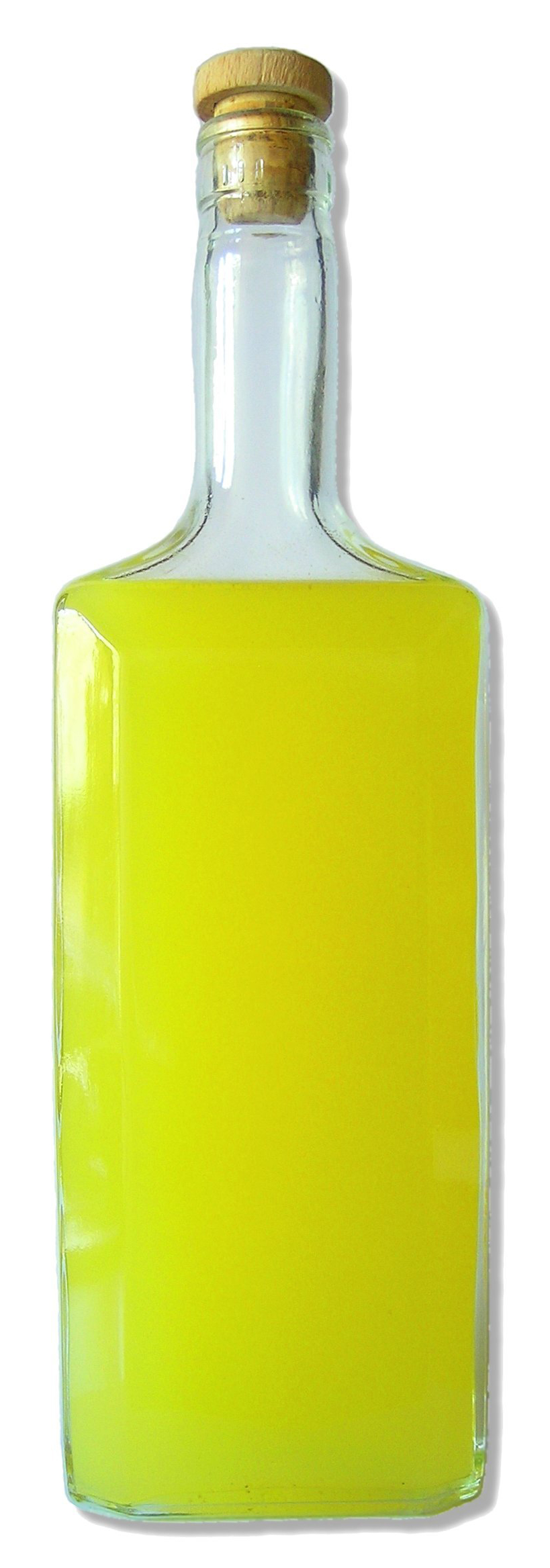
A bottle of homemade limoncello

- 99 Schnapps (various flavor variations – apple, banana, black cherry, etc., 99-proof)
- Amarula (South African liqueur; marula fruit)
- Bajtra (Maltese liqueur, prickly pear)
- Cuarenta Y Tres/Licor 43 (citrus, vanilla)
- Damson gin (damson)
- Hpnotiq (tropical fruit)
- Jabuticaba
- Kruškovac (pear)
- Kwai Feh (lychee)
- Lichido (vodka, cognac, lychee and guava essences, and white peach juice)
- Limoncello (lemon liqueur)
- Manzana verde (green apple)
- Medronho (strawberry tree/arbutus)
- Midori (melon)
- Noyau de Poissy (apricot)
- Pama (pomegranate)
- Passoã (passion fruit; also comes in mango, pineapple, and coconut flavors)
- Pisang Ambon (banana)
- Pucker (apple; also comes in watermelon, grape, and peach flavors)
- Rhythm
- Sloe gin (Sloes infused in gin)
- Soho (lychee)
- Sombai (banana, pineapple, orange, lemon, mango)
- TY KU (yuzu, honeydew, mangosteen, ginseng, green tea, goji berry)
- Umeshu (ume plum)
- X-Rated Fusion Liqueur (blood orange, mango and passion fruit)
- Yangmeijiu (yangmei)

== Herbal liqueurs ==
=== Anise-flavored liqueurs ===
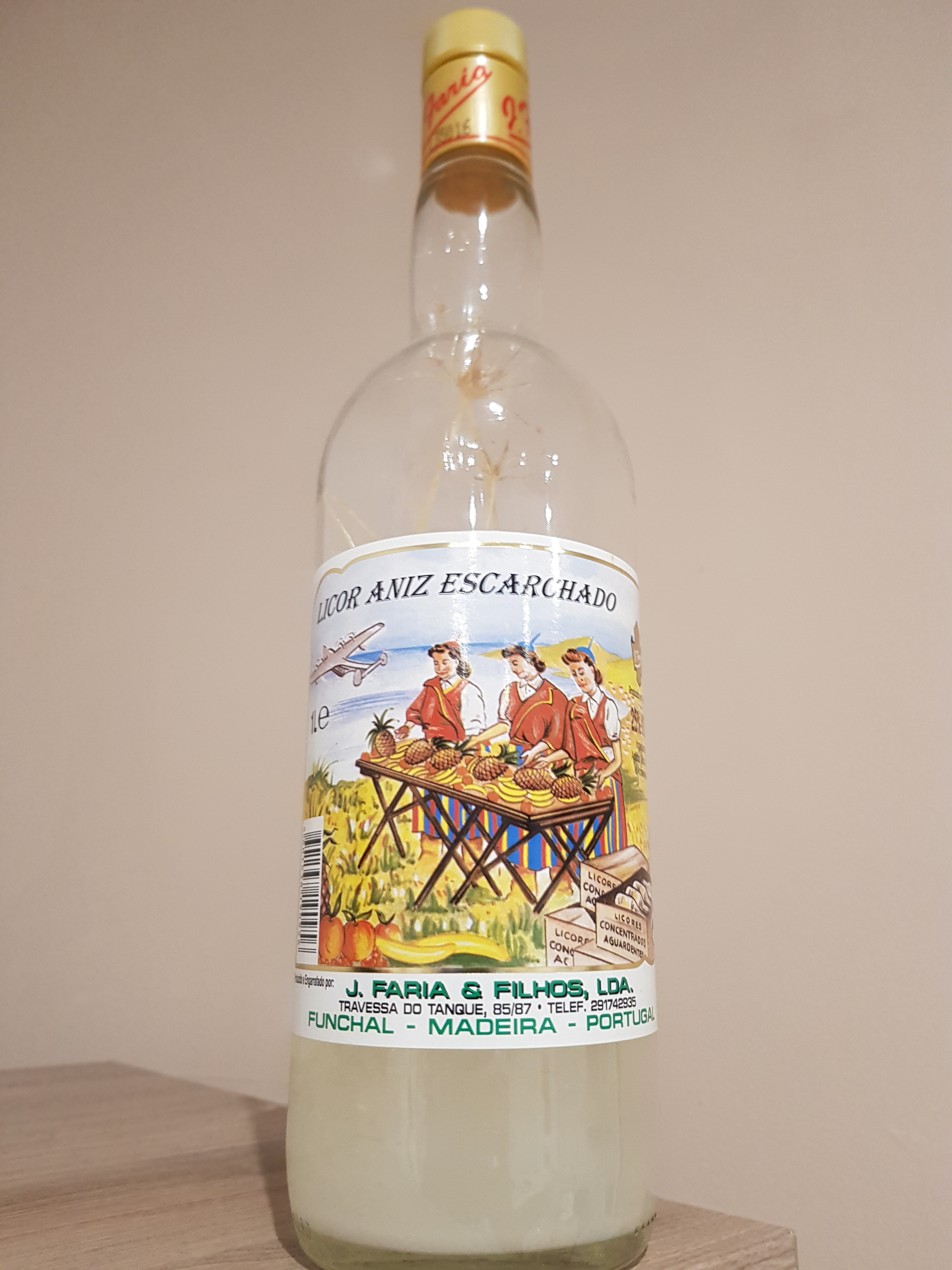
A bottle of Licor Aniz Escarchado

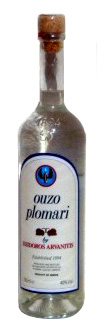
A bottle of ouzo

- Anís (Spain, Argentina, Perú)
- Licor Aniz Escarchado, (Portugal)
- Anisette (France)
- Centerbe (Italy; infusion of 100 high mountain herbs)
- Galliano (Italy)
- Herbsaint (United States)
- Passione Nera (Italy)
- Pastis (France)
- Patxaran (Spain)
- Ricard (France)
- Sambuca (Italy)
- Sombai Anise & Coffee (Cambodia)
- Vespetrò (Italy)
- Xtabentún (Mexico)
- Cucui (Aruba)

=== Other herbal liqueurs ===
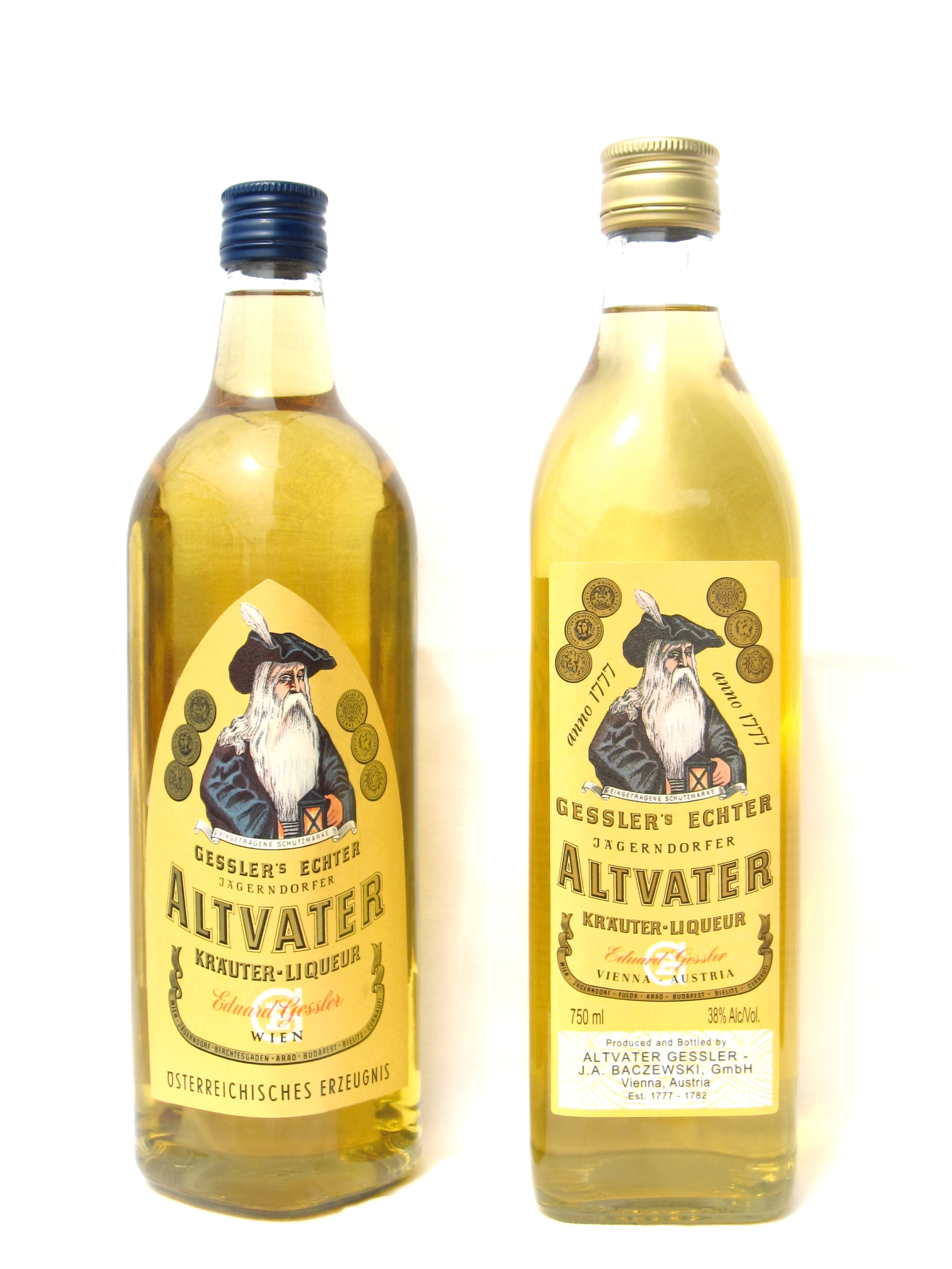
"Altvater" by Gessler, originally from Austrian Silesia

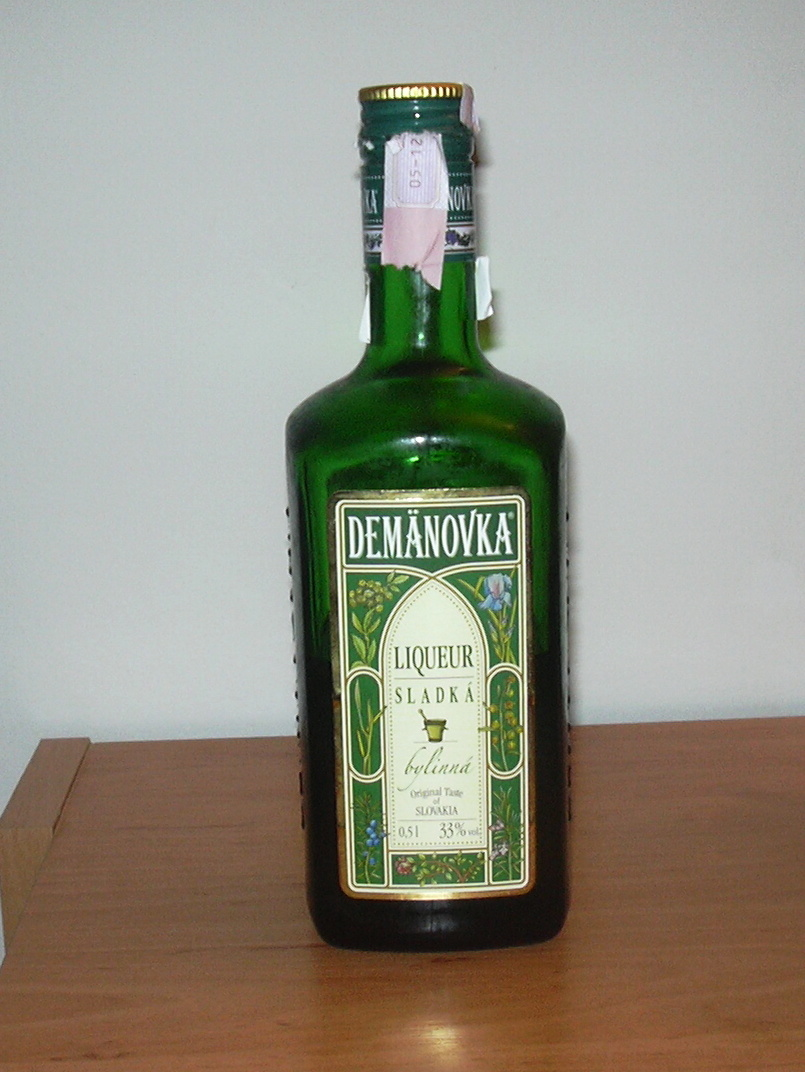
Demänovka (33 %) – produced in Slovakia

- Allasch (caraway, flavoured with bitter almonds, angelica, orange)
- Agwa de Bolivia (37 herbs)
- Altvater
- Amaro
- Becherovka (anise seeds, cinnamon, and other herbs)
- Beirão (seeds and herbs from around the world)
- Bénédictine (27 herbs and spices)
- Boilo (a homemade Christmas liqueur from the Pennsylvania Coal Region)
- Calisaya (cinchona calisaya bark, Seville orange extract and other botanicals)
- Canton (spirits, brandy, six varieties of ginger, ginseng, and honey)
- Chartreuse (130 herbal extracts) Green and Yellow versions
- Cynar (artichoke)
- Demänovka (a Slovak liqueur, from honey and 14 herbs)
- Danzig Goldwasser (gold leaf, roots, and herbs)
- Everglo (tequila, vodka, caffeine, and ginseng)
- Fernet (myrrh, rhubarb, chamomile, cardamom, aloe, and saffron)
- Galliano (30 herbs)
- Gammel Dansk Bitter Dram (a Danish digestif bitter with 29 herbs)
- Goldschläger (cinnamon, with gold leaf)
- Jaan Paan Liqueur (sweet paan flavored)
- Jägermeister (56 herbs)
- Jing Jiu (Chinese yam, xian mao, dong quai, desert-broomrape, goji, huang qi, barrenwort, cinnamon, cloves)
- Killepitsch (combination of 90 fruits, berries, herbs, and spices)
- Krampus Herbal Liqueur (herbs, honey, roasted hazelnuts, and spices including cinnamon, clove, and citrus)
- Krupnik (honey and up to 50 different herbs)
- Kümmel (caraway seed, cumin, and fennel)
- Mamajuana (rum, tree barks, herbs, spices and honey)
- Mastica (mastic resin)
- Mastichato (Mastic resin)
- Menta (peppermint liqueur)
- Metaxa
- Minttu (peppermint liqueur)
- Riga Black Balsam (Rigas Melnais Balzams)
- Singeverga (herbs and spices) – Made by monks at the Singeverga Monastery in Porto, Portugal, it is a sweet-tasting liqueur
- Strega (70 herbs, including mint, fennel, and saffron)
- Tubi 60 (Lemon, citrus, tree barks, spices, herbs: ginger, mint, anise, saffron, turmeric, cumin and others)
- Underberg (a German digestif bitter)
- Unicum (more than 40 herbs)
- Yomeishu – first made by Sokan Shiozawa in 1602

== Honey liqueurs ==
- Bärenjäger
- Bénédictine
- Boilo
- Chambord
- Drambuie
- Glayva
- Irish Mist
- Krambambula
- Krampus Herbal Liqueur
- Krupnik
- Mama Juana
- Rakomelo
- Ron miel
- Xtabentún
- Yukon Jack

== Nut-flavored liqueurs ==
- Amaretto (almonds, or the almond-like kernels from apricots, peaches, cherries, or similar stone fruits)
- Disaronno (apricot kernel oil)
- Frangelico (hazelnuts and herbs)
- Kahana Royale – a macadamia nut liqueur produced in Hawaii
- Krampus Herbal Liqueur (made from roasted hazelnuts)
- Nocello (walnut and hazelnut)
- Nocino (unripe green walnuts)
- Orahovac – a walnut liqueur prepared using unripe green walnuts
- Peanut liqueur
- Peanut Lolita (peanut)
- Pochteca Almond Liqueur
- Ratafia (brandy flavored with almonds, fruit, or fruit kernels; also a flavored biscuit)
- Rivulet – a pecan liqueur produced in Kentucky, United States

== Whisky liqueurs ==
- Atholl Brose (Scotch whisky, Benromach single malt spirit, honey, secret spice recipe, from Gordon & Macphail)
- Bruadar (Scotch whisky, honey, sloe)
- Cock o' the North (single malt, blueberry)
- Drambuie (Scotch, heather honey, herbs, and spices)
- Eblana (Irish whiskey, coffee, honey, almond, peanut)
- Famous Grouse liqueur (Scotch, bourbon, citrus, spices)
- Fireball Cinnamon Whisky (Canadian whisky, cinnamon, spices)
- Forty Creek Premium Cream Liqueur (Canadian whisky, vanilla, chocolate, caramel)
- Glayva (Scotch, Seville oranges, spices, herbs, and honey)
- Glenfiddich Malt liqueur (Scotch, citrus, pear, brown sugar)
- Glenturret Malt liqueur (Glenturret single malt, honey, spices)
- Heaven Hill (Evan Williams cherry, honey and apple orchard variations)
- Irish Mist (aged Irish whiskey, heather and clover honey, aromatic herbs, and other spirits)
- Jack Daniel's Tennessee Honey (Jack Daniel's whiskey, honey)
- Jeremiah Weed (Bourbon whiskey, orange, vanilla)
- Jim Beam Honey (Jim Beam bourbon, honey)
- Jim Beam Red Stag (Jim Beam bourbon with other flavorings – variations include black cherry, honey tea, and cinnamon spiced)
- Lochan Ora (Chivas, honey, herbs and spices)
- Murray Scottish Highland Liqueur (Scotch, honey, sloe)
- Mystic Bourbon Liqueur (Bourbon, honey, spices)
- Old Pulteney liqueur (Old Pulteney single malt, prune, spices)
- Orangerie (Scotch, oranges, spices)
- Rock and Rye (American rye whiskey, citrus, rock candy)
- Sortilège Maple Whiskey Liqueur (Canadian whisky, maple syrup)
- Stag's Breath (Speyside malts and fermented comb honey)
- Southern Comfort (neutral grain spirits with whiskey, peach, orange and spice flavorings)
- Sweet Revenge (liqueur) (Strawberry syrup, American whiskey)
- The Knot (Irish whiskey)
- Wallace Liqueur (Deanston single malt, Scottish berries, French herbs)
- Wild Turkey American Honey (Wild Turkey (bourbon), honey, spices)
- Yukon Jack (Canadian whisky, honey)

== Other liqueurs ==
- Advocaat (egg yolks and vanilla)
- After Shock (several varieties, the most popular of which is cinnamon)
- Agnes (orange peels, apples, vanilla and caraway seeds)
- Ancho Reyes (poblano peppers)
- Armada (spices and fruit)
- Aurum (rum, tea, and tangerines)
- Baczewski
- Bärenfang (honey; one export version is named Bärenjäger)
- Beechleaf noyau (Beech leaves and gin)
- Bloody Oath (vodka, herbs and spices)
- Campari (bitter and aromatic herbs, plants, and fruit)
- Cohasset Punch (rum, wine, fruits)
- Cynar (artichoke and other herbs and plants)
- Damiana (herb of the same name)
- Gabriel (cinnamon, apple, black pepper and peppermint)
- Génépi (alpine flower of the same name)
- Izarra (numerous herbs and other flavorings)
- Jumbie (rum liqueur)
- Kajmir (vanilla, brandy, and vodka)(No longer offered by Constellation Brands)
- kareek rum
- Kännu Kukk
- Licor de oro (whey, saffron and lemon peel)
- Liqueurs de Sodabi – NeHo Likors (distilled, then flavoured, palm-wine; flavours include banana, cinnamon, pineapple, passion fruit; made by NeHo Likors in Togo)
- Malört (wormwood)
- Mesi (honey)
- Palm wine (coconut wine)
- Patxaran (Sloes, coffee beans, and vanilla pod)
- Pimento Dram (not the peppers stuffed into olives, but allspice; made in Jamaica by Wray and Nephews)
- Returner (Earl Grey tea)
- Qi (lapsang souchong tea, fruits, spices, and Chardonnay brandy)
- Qi White (orange, ginger, clove, other herbs and spices, and white tea)
- Rumpleminze (peppermint)
- Salmiakki Koskenkorva (salmiakkikossu, salmari, salmiakki; originally Turkish pepper salty licorice)
- Sève Fournier (Champagne cognac, cocoa sap, vanilla, iris, and plant extracts)
- Sorel or Sorrel (Jamaican white rum, pimento/allspice, clove, cassia, ginger, nutmeg, hibiscus)
- Swedish Punsch (arrack, rum, citrus, spices)
- Tuaca (brandy, vanilla, and citrus)
- TY KU (Asian spirit base (sake and soju), with yuzu, honeydew, mangosteen, green tea, wolfberry, and ginseng)
- Vana Tallinn (rum, citrus oil, vanilla, cinnamon, and other spices)
- Vov (liqueur) (egg yolk, sugar and marsala wine)
- Voyant Chai Cream (a chai-flavoured liqueur containing oak-aged rum, cream, black tea, vanilla, and spices)
- Y Chilli (cinnamon, chili peppers, and other ingredients)

== See also ==
- List of alcoholic beverages
- List of cocktails
- List of national liquors
- List of whisky brands
- List of vodka brands
