= List of national liquors =

Popular liquors by country

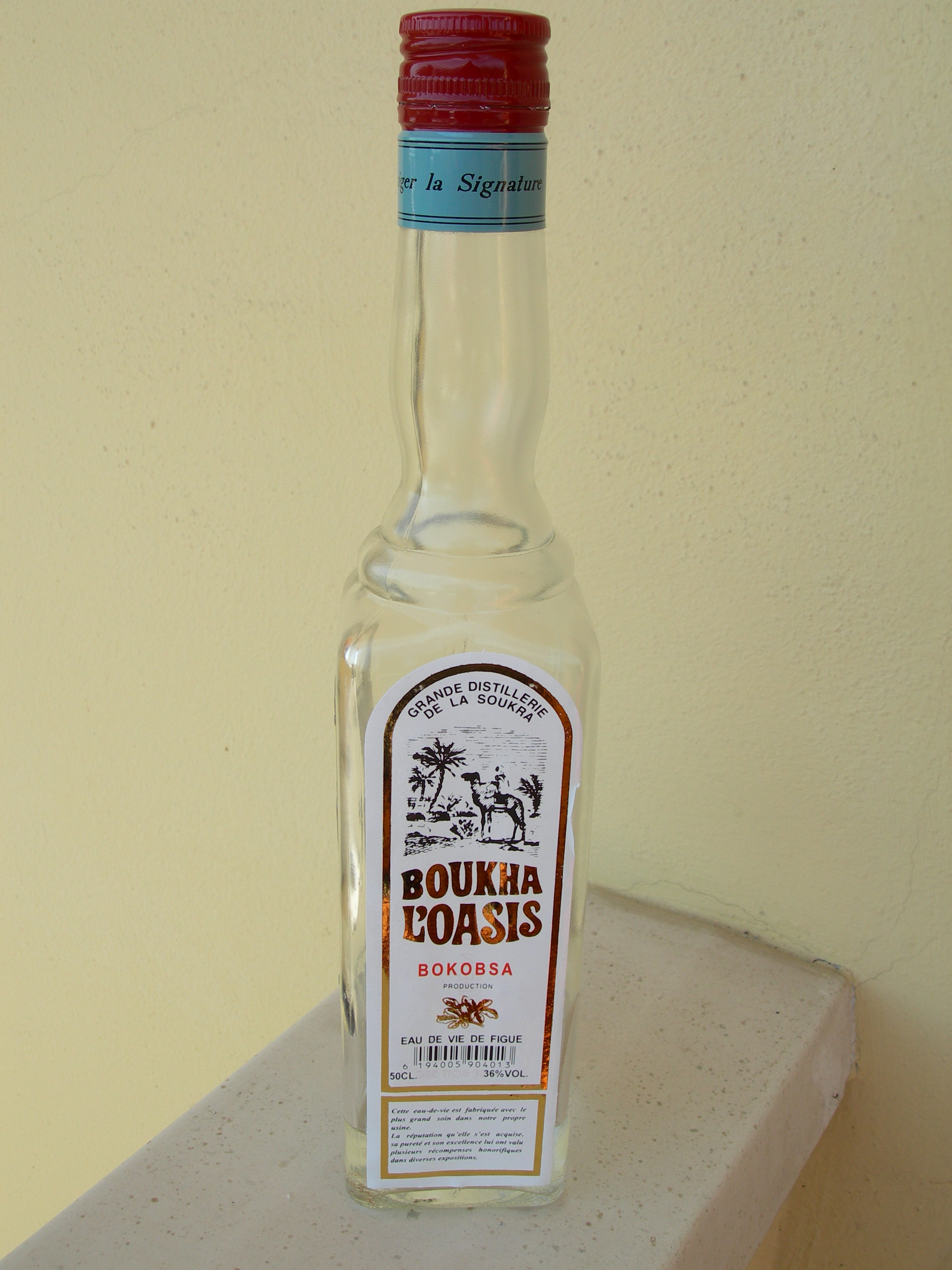
A bottle of the traditional Tunisian Boukha

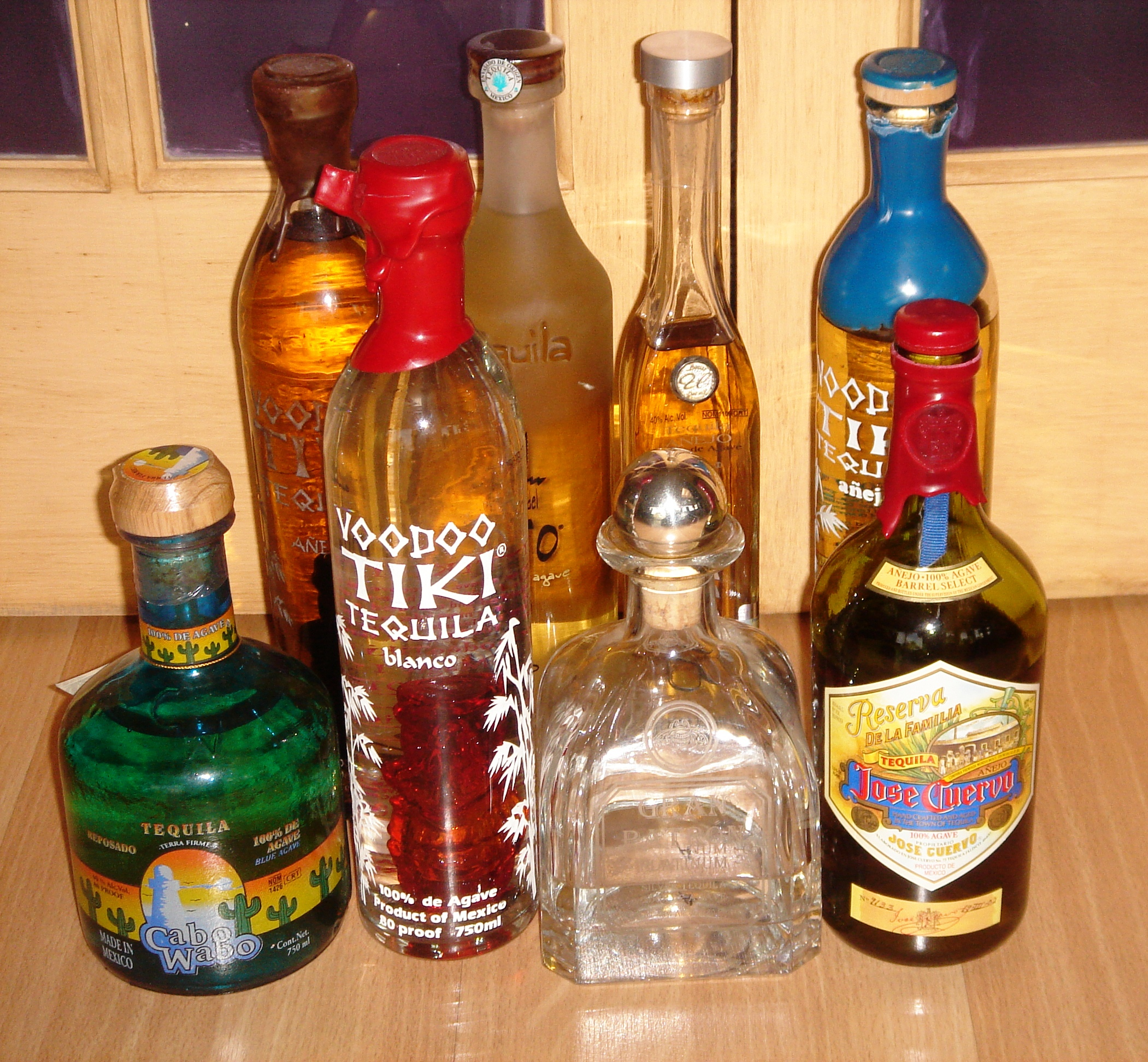
Tequila, a national liquor of Mexico, is a spirit made from the blue agave plant, primarily in the area surrounding the city of Tequila, 65 kilometres (40 mi) northwest of Guadalajara, and in the highlands (Los Altos) of the western Mexican state of Jalisco.

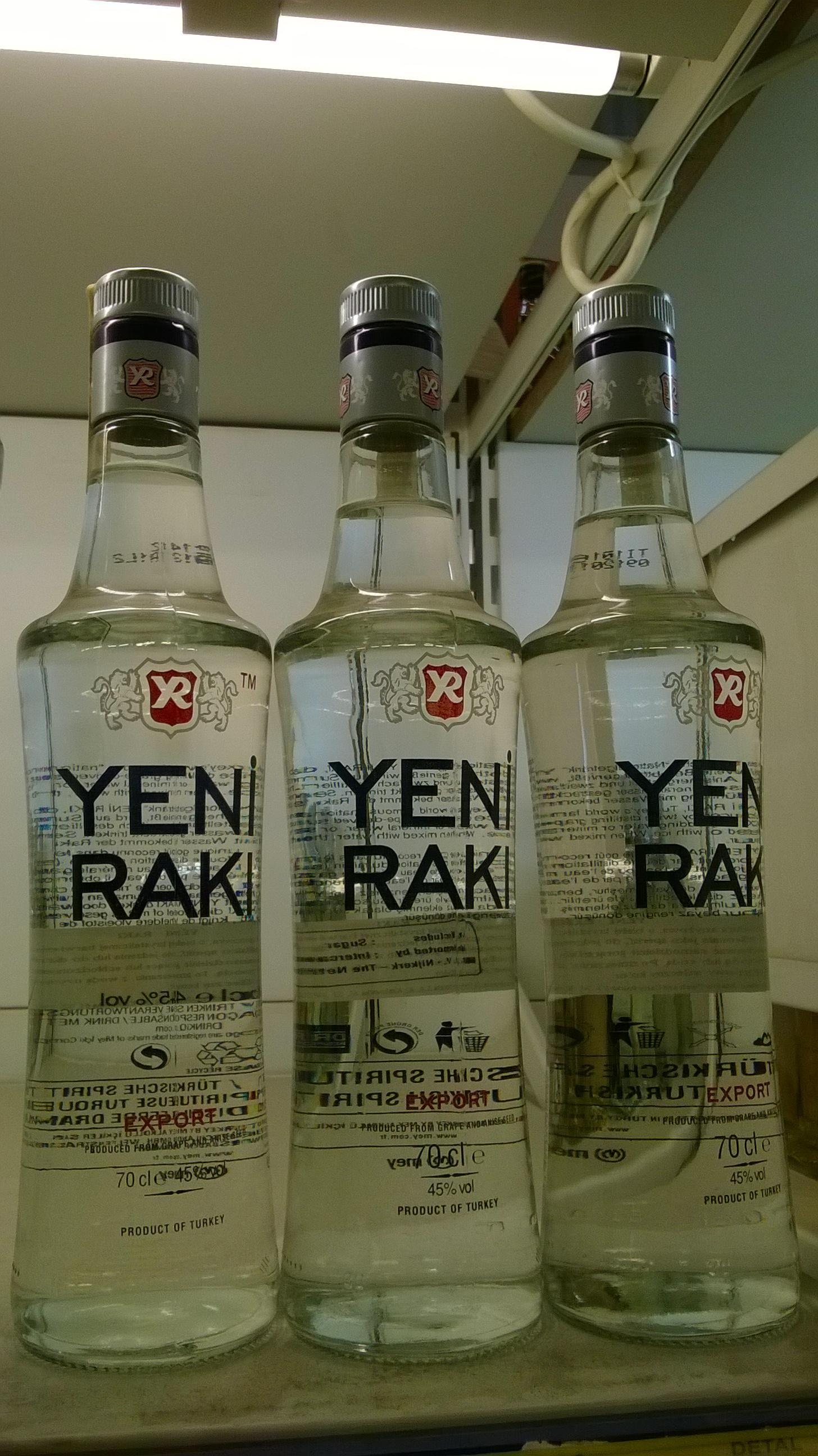
Turkish Rakı

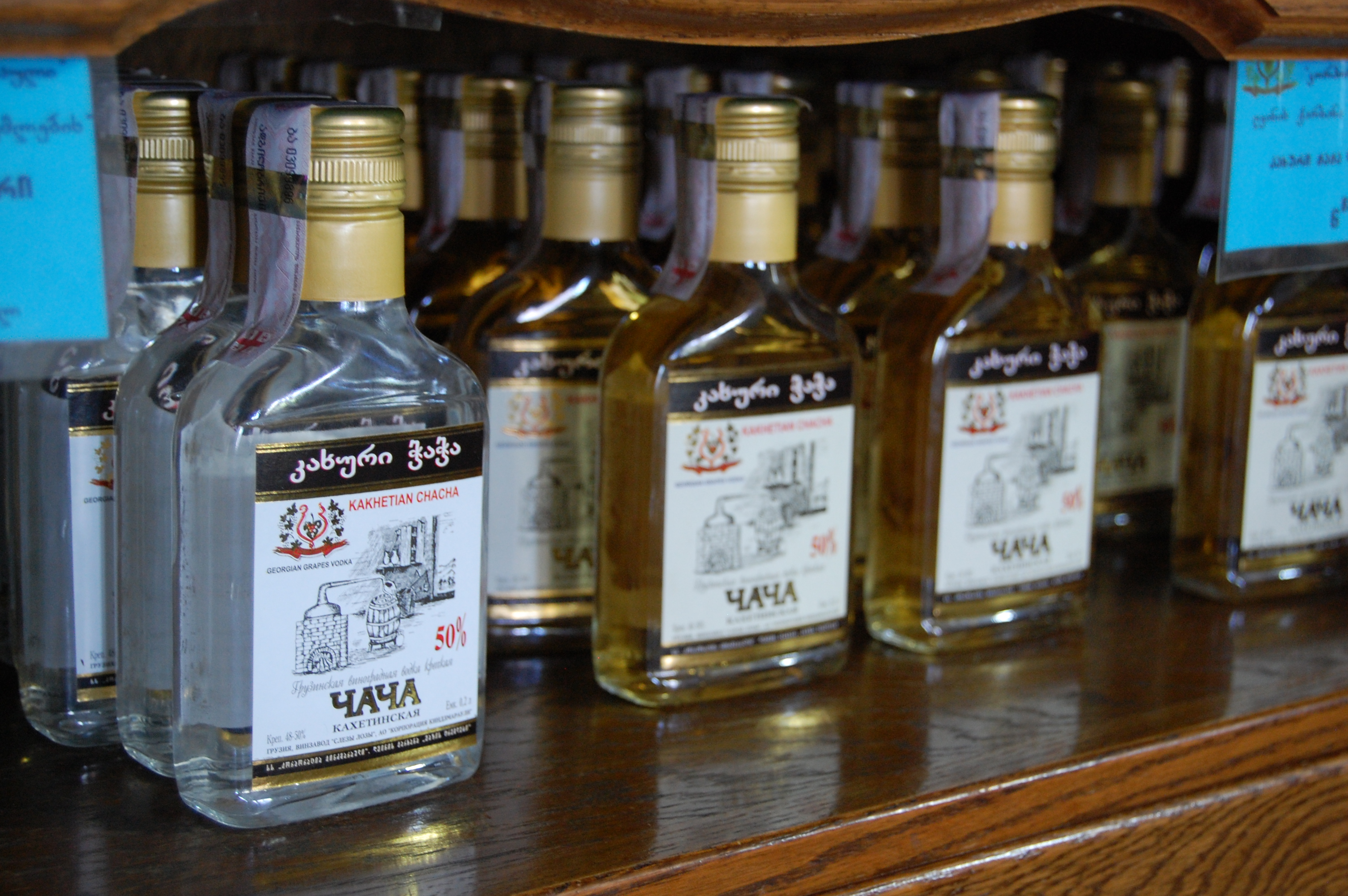
Georgian chacha

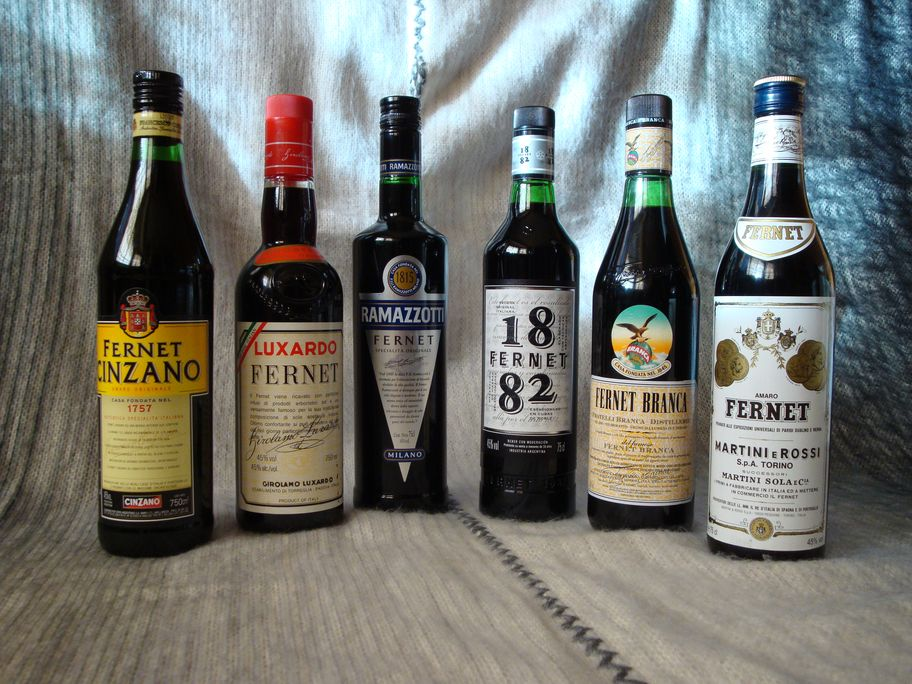
Italian fernet

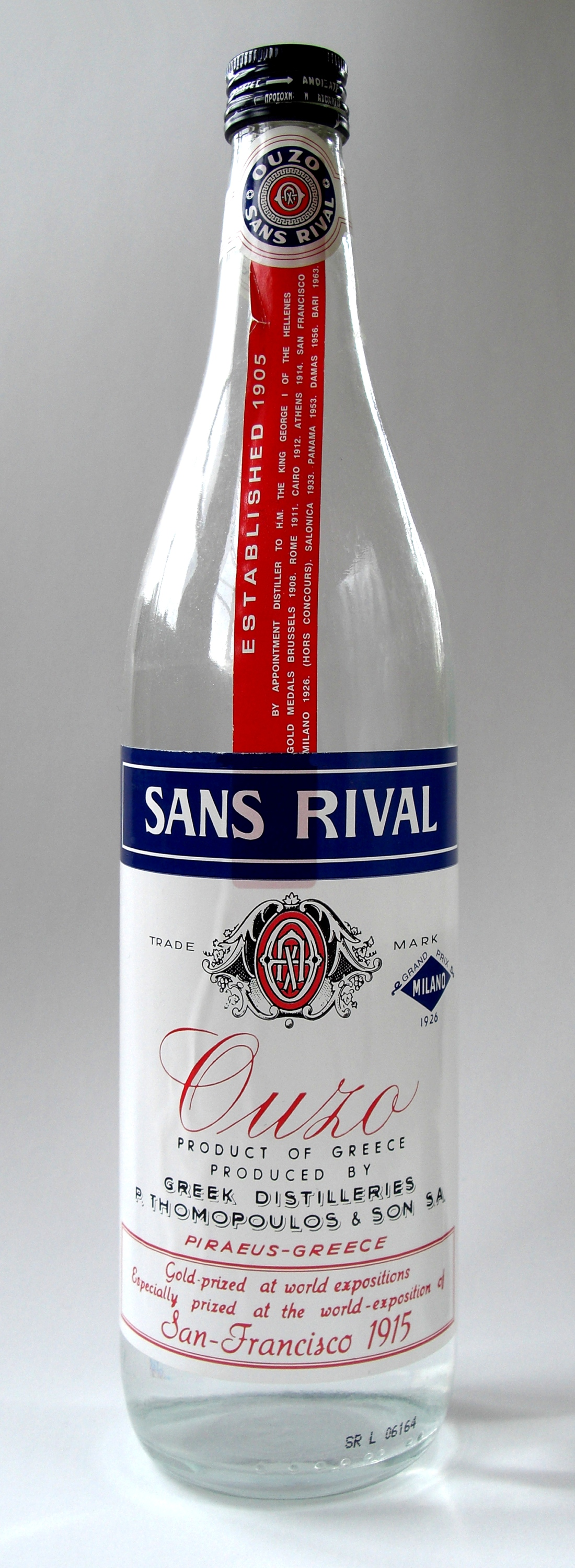
Ouzo is an anise-flavored aperitif that is widely consumed in Greece and Cyprus, and a symbol of Greek culture.

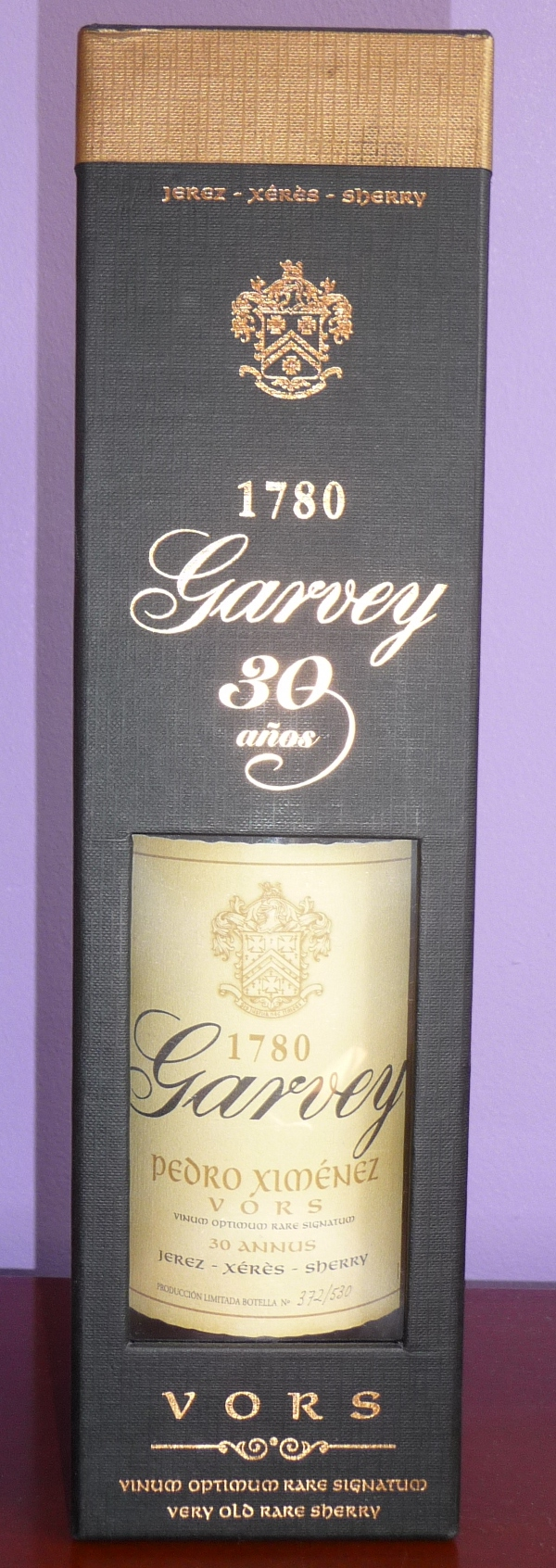
"Very Old Rare Sherry", Pedro Ximenez by Garvey. Jerez de la Frontera (Andalusia, Spain), aged 30 years. Sherry is a national liquor of Spain.

This is a list of national liquors. A national liquor is a distilled alcoholic beverage considered standard and respected in a given country. While the status of many such drinks may be informal, there is usually a consensus in a given country that a specific drink has national status or is the "most popular liquor" in a given nation. This list is distinct from national drink, which include non-alcoholic beverages.

== East Asia ==
- China: Baijiu (including Kaoliang liquor) (sorghum, rice, wheat, barley, millet)
- Taiwan: Kaoliang liquor (Kinmen Kaoliang Liquor and Matsu Kaoliang from Matsu Distillery)
- Japan: Shōchū (including Awamori) (rice, barley, sweet potatoes, buckwheat), Japanese whisky
- North Korea: Pyongyang Soju
- South Korea: Soju (rice, barley, corn, potato, sweet potato), Makgeolli, Cheongju
- Mongolia: Kumis (Airag)

== Europe ==
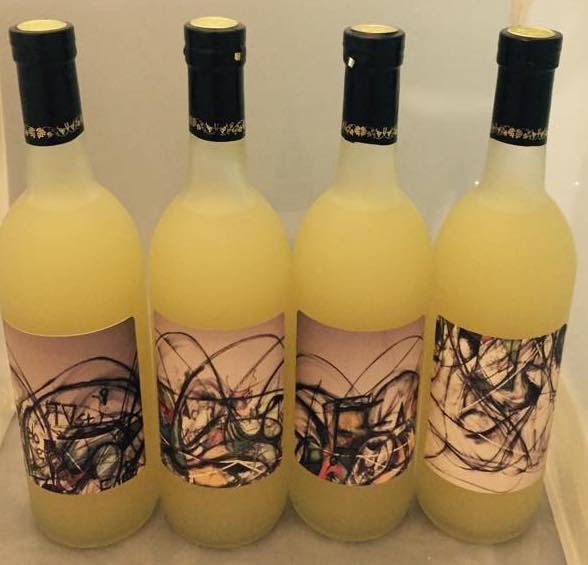
Bottles of Italian limoncello

- Albania: Rakia
- Austria: Inländer Rum & schnapps (fruit)
- Belarus: Krambambula
- Belgium: Jenever (malt and Juniper)
- Bosnia and Herzegovina: Rakija (fruit: apples, plums, pears)
- Bulgaria: Rakia (grapes, apricots, plums)
- Croatia: Rakija (fruit: plums, pears) and Pelinkovac
- Cyprus: Zivania (wine or grape residue left over from winemaking) and Commandaria (sweet dessert wine)
- Czech Republic: Becherovka (herbs) or Slivovice (plums)
- Denmark: Akvavit (grain or potatoes)
- Estonia: Vana Tallinn
- Finland: Koskenkorva Viina (grain (barley) and Finlandia vodka (barley)
- France: Calvados (apple brandy from Normandy), Armagnac, Cognac,, Pastis, Chartreuse, Grand Marnier, Crème de cassis, absinthe
- Germany: Schnapps (fruit) (in the South), Korn (in the North)
- Greece: Raki (Ρακί ή Ρακή), produced from fruit. Ouzo (distilled 96 percent pure ethyl alcohol and Anise). Crete: Tsikoudia (pomace raki). Mainland Greece: Tsipouro (pomace raki)
- Hungary: Unicum (herbs), Pálinka (fruit), Tokaji
- Iceland: Brennivín, aka “Black Death” (potatoes)
- Ireland: Irish Whiskey (fermented mash of cereal grains), Poitín (malted barley grain)
- Italy: Grappa (pomace and grape residue left over from winemaking), Limoncello, Amaretto, Amaro, Fernet, Mirto, Alchermes, Aperol, Campari, Cynar, Frangelico, Maraschino, Rosolio, Sambuca, Strega
- Latvia: Riga Black Balsam
- Lithuania: Midus
- North Macedonia: Rakija and Mastika (Typically, red and/or white grapes. Plums used in some areas such as Kichevo. Mastika is anise and herb flavored rakija)
- Montenegro: Rakija (Loza), produced from red grapes
- Netherlands: Jenever (Malt and Juniper)
- Norway: Akevitt (must be distilled from Norwegian potatoes and aged for a minimum of six months in oak casks to be labeled "Norwegian Akevitt", unlike Danish and Swedish akvavit, which is commonly grain-based and unaged)
- Poland: Nalewka, Krupnik, Vodka (grain, rye, wheat, potatoes, or sugar beet Molasses), and, during the era of the Polish-Lithuanian Commonwealth, mead
- Portugal: Madeira wine, Port wine, Ginjinha, Jeropiga, Licor Beirão, Bitter almond liqueur and Madeiran rum.
- Romania: Ţuică (plums) or Pălincă (fruit)
- Russia: Vodka (grain, rye, wheat, potatoes, or sugar beet molasses)
- Serbia: Rakija (šljivovica in particular)
- Slovakia: Slivovica, Borovička (juniper berries)

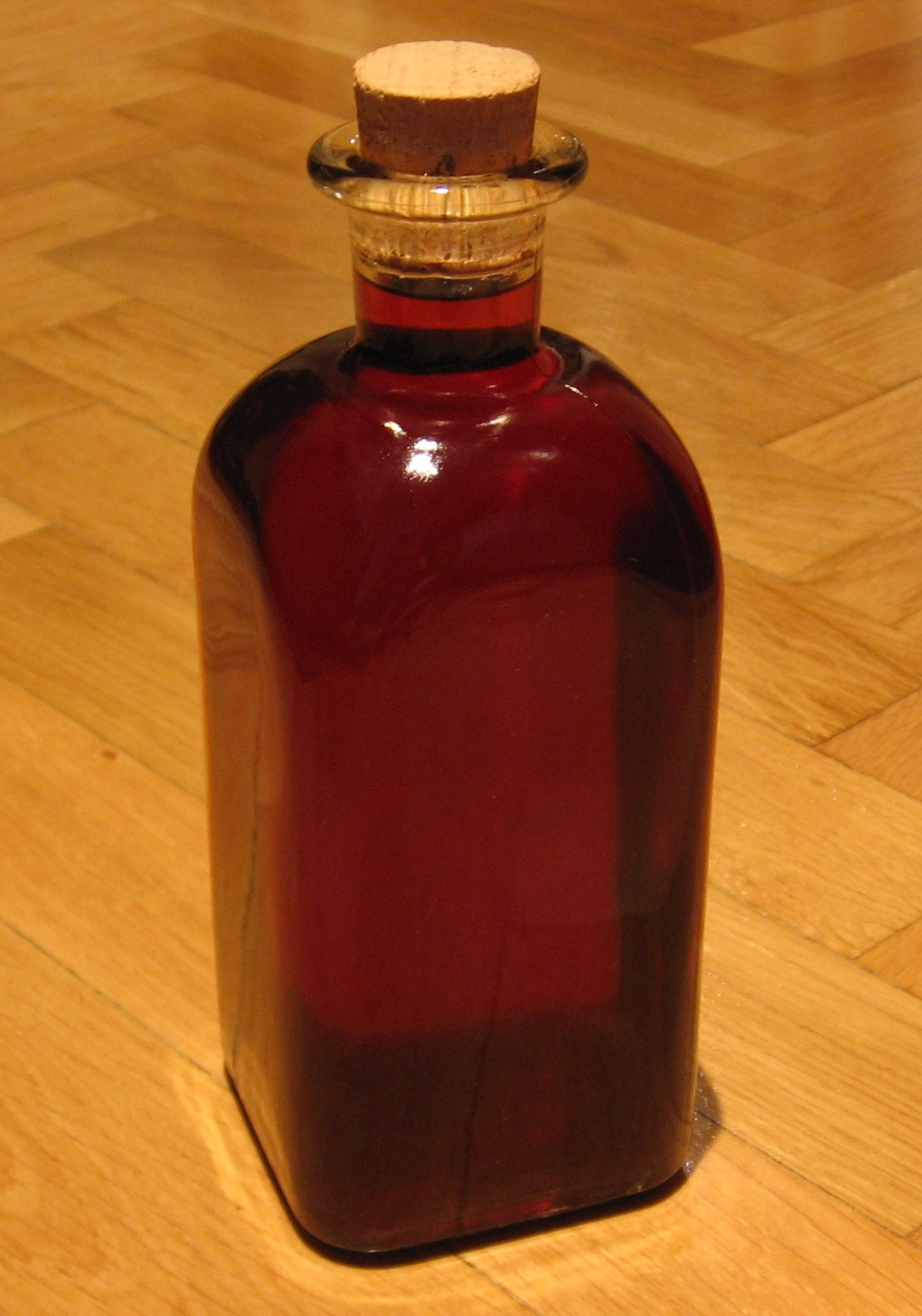
Patxaran, a sloe berry liqueur

- Spain: Sherry (brandy-fortified Spanish wine)
  - Catalonia: Ratafia, Aromes de Montserrat
  - Navarre: Patxaran
- Sweden: Brännvin, Akvavit, Snaps and Punsch
- Switzerland: Absinthe, Goldschläger, Pflümli, Poire Williams, Kirsch
- Turkey: Rakı (twice-distilled Suma and Anise)
- Ukraine: Horilka (Ukrainian vodka), Hrenovuha
- United Kingdom:
  - England : Cider (south) Whisky (north)
  - Northern Ireland : Irish Whiskey
  - Scotland : Scotch Whisky, particularly Single malt whisky is considered the national drink of Scotland.
  - Wales : Welsh Whisky
  - Isle of Man: Manx Spirit (Note: The Isle of Man is one of the Crown Dependencies and is not legally part of the United Kingdom.)

== Latin America and Caribbean ==
- Argentina: Wine, fernet con coca (cocktail), hesperidina (apéritif)
- Barbados: Rum (sugarcane molasses)
- Belize: Rum (sugarcane molasses)
- Bolivia: Singani (muscat grapes)
- Brazil: Cachaça (sugarcane)
- Chile: Pisco (grapes; in contention with Peru)
- Colombia: Aguardiente
- Costa Rica: Guaro (sugarcane)
- Cuba: Rum (sugarcane molasses)
- Dominican Republic: Rum and Mamajuana
- Ecuador: Aguardiente (sugarcane)
- El Salvador: Chaparro
- French West Indies: Rum (sugarcane)
- Guatemala: Rum, and Cusha
- Haiti: Rum, and Clairin (sugarcane)
- Honduras: Guaro
- Jamaica: Rum (sugarcane)
- Nicaragua: Rum (sugarcane)
- Panama: Seco Herrerano (sugarcane)
- Paraguay: Caña blanca (sugarcane)

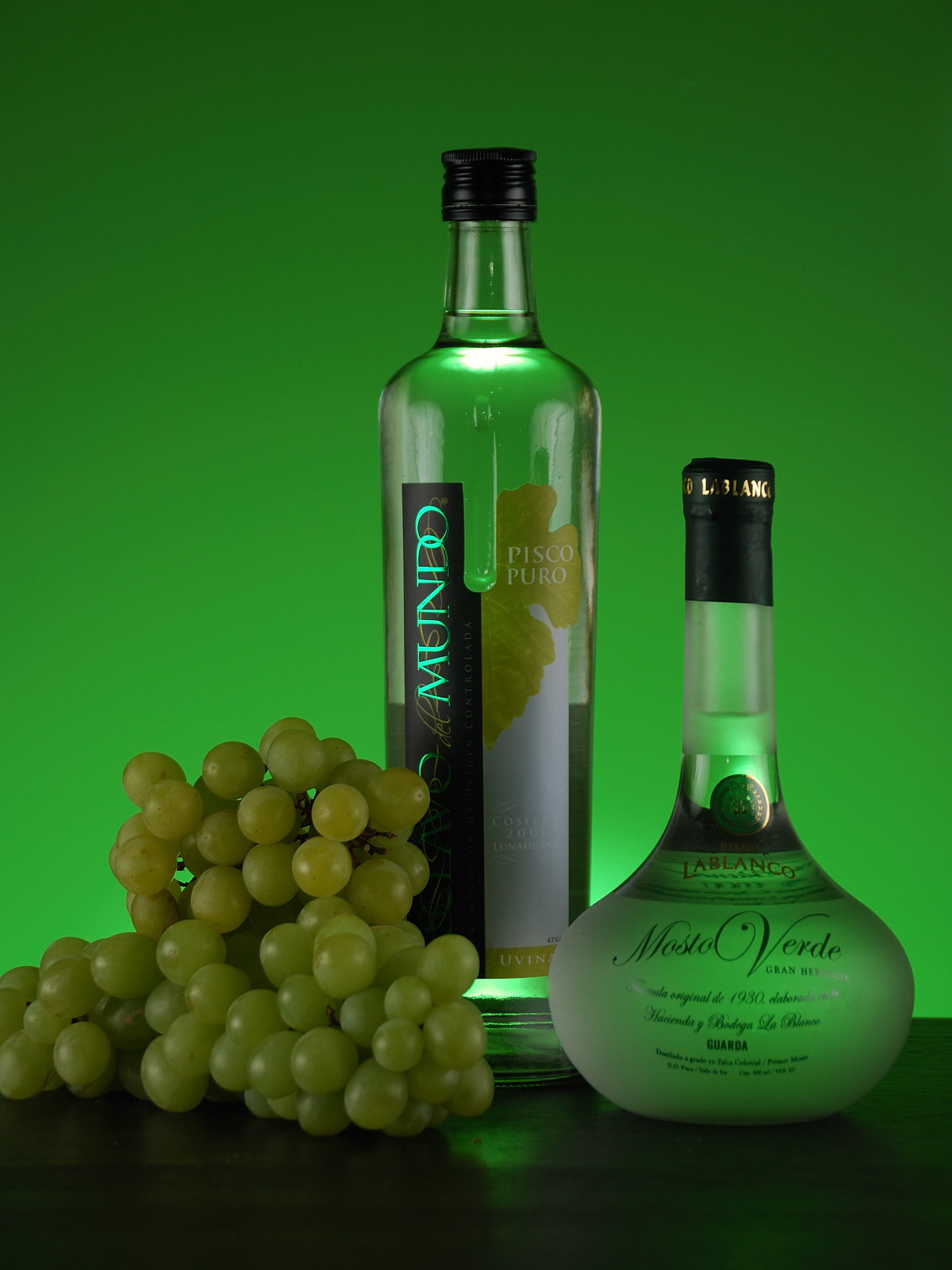
Pisco

- Peru: Pisco (grapes; in contention with Chile)
- Puerto Rico: Pitorro, Rum
- Trinidad & Tobago: Rum (sugarcane)
- Uruguay: Grappamiel (grape pomace, honey), Grappa (grape pomace, originally Italian), espinillar (sugar cane)
- Venezuela: Rum (sugarcane), Miche andino (brown sugar) and cocuy (agave cocui)

== North America ==
- Bermuda: Rum
- Mexico: Tequila (blue agave), Mezcal, Pulque, and Brandy
- Canada: Canadian Whisky
- United States: Bourbon Whiskey

== Oceania ==
- Australia: Bundaberg Rum
- New Zealand: Rum
- Hawaii: Kava

== South Asia ==
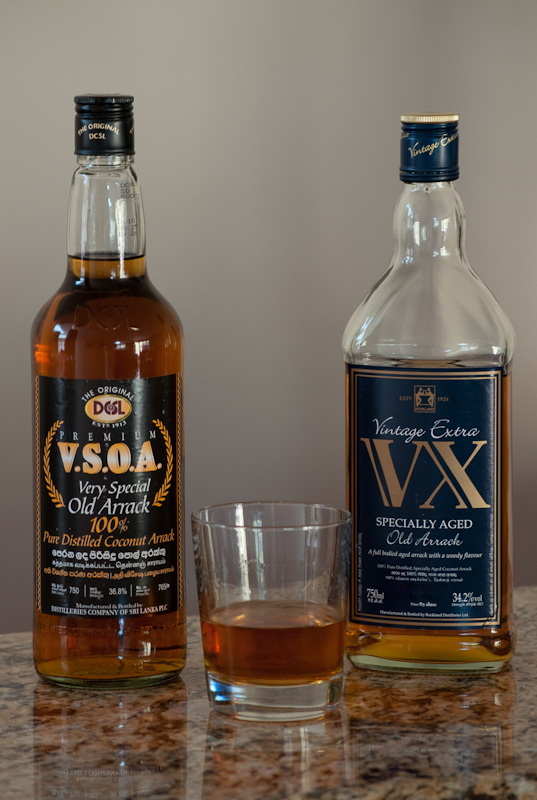
Two kinds of Arrack from Sri Lanka

- Bangladesh: vodka and brandy from Carew, toddy (palm wine) (pronounced tari in Bengali)
- India: Rum (Old Monk), Feni (Cashew or coconut), Toddy (palm wine), tharra, Chandr Haas
- Nepal: Raksi, Chhaang
- Sri Lanka: coconut Arrack, coconut Toddy and Palm Toddy

== Southeast Asia ==
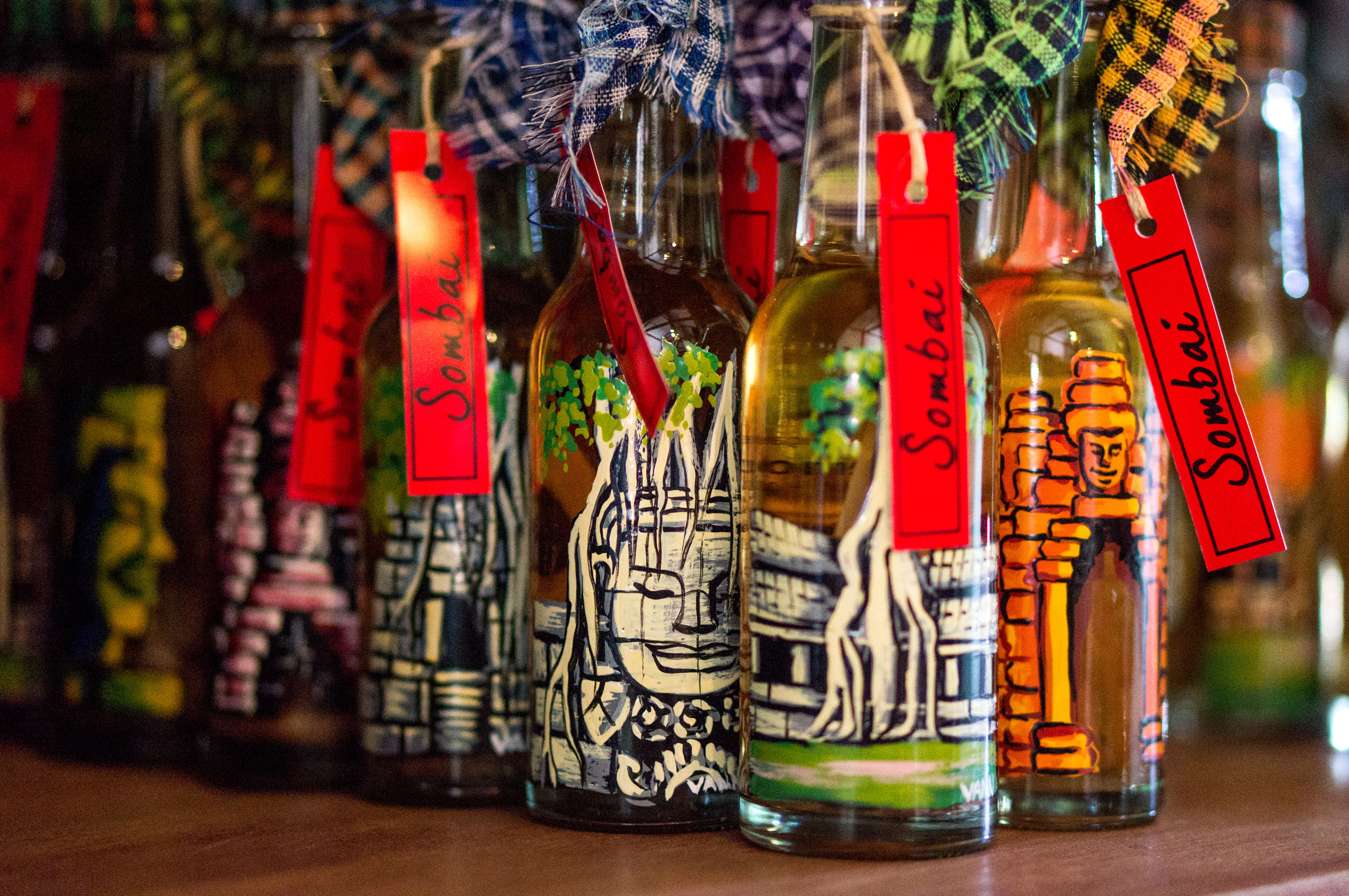
Bottles of Sombai infused rice wine with hand-painted images of Angkor temples

- Cambodia: Sombai infused rice wine
- Indonesia: Arak (Bali), Tuak (Sumatra & Java), Moke (Flores), Sopi (Ambon & Nusa Tenggara), Cap Tikus (Manado), Ballo (Toraja), Swansrai (Papua)
- Laos: Lao-Lao (Lao: ເຫລົ້າໄຫ) is a Laotian rice whisky produced in Laos. Along with Beerlao, lao-Lao is a staple drink in Laos.
- Malaysia: Tuak
- Philippines: Gin (Ginebra San Miguel), Lambanog
- Thailand: Lao Khao, Sato, Mekhong whiskey (95% sugarcane/molasses and 5% rice), Mekhong, Namtanmao, Sang Som
- Vietnam: Rượu đế (glutinous or non-glutinous rice) and Rượu thuốc (herbs and raw animals)

== West Asia ==
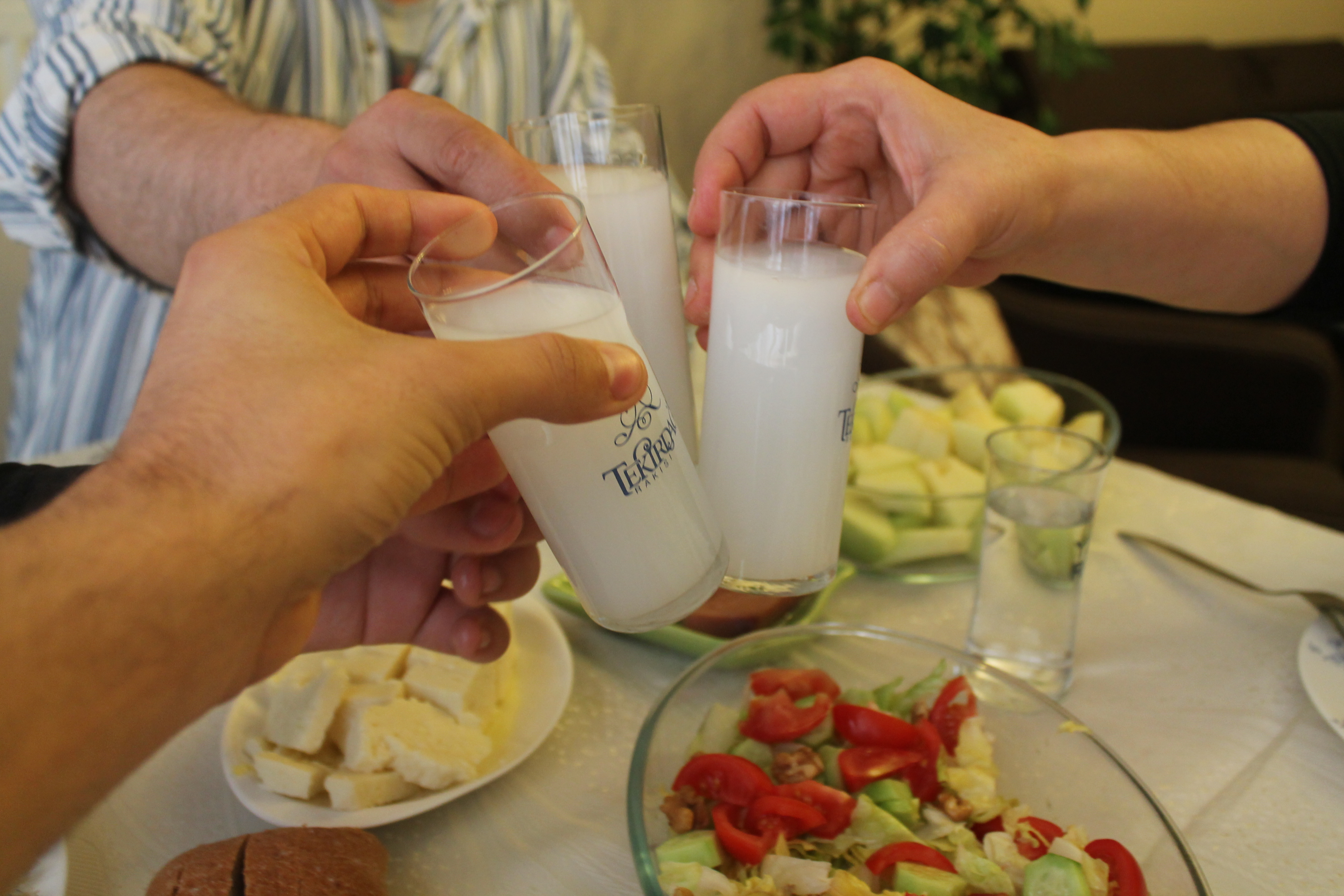
Toasting with rakı, in typical rakı glasses

- Armenia: Oghi
- Georgia: Chacha
- Iran: Aragh sagi and Shiraz wine (historically, as alcohol consumption is currently banned for Muslims)
- Israel: Arak, Tubi 60
- Jordan: Arak
- Lebanon: Arak (Anise)
- Levant: Arak
- Palestine: Arak
- Syria: Arak (Anise)
- Turkey: Rakı (twice-distilled Suma and Anise)

== See also ==
- Alcoholic beverage
- Distilled beverage
- Ethanol
- Liqueur
- List of alcoholic beverages
- List of cocktails
- List of liqueur brands
- List of national drinks
- List of vodka brands
- List of whisky brands
- National dish
