= Sangster's =

Rum cream liqueur

Sangster's Original Jamaica Rum Cream Liqueur is a rum and cream based liqueur produced in Jamaica. It was invented by Dr. Ian Sangster, who arrived in Jamaica in 1967 with a contract to lecture at the University of the West Indies.

== Overview ==
Sangster left teaching to create a liqueur. The ingredients are Jamaican rum blended with dairy cream and a mix of Jamaican fruits and spices.

Sangster's liqueur can be compared to Baileys Irish Cream, Kahlúa coffee liqueur and Carolans Irish Cream Liqueur. During the 2003 San Francisco World Spirits Competition, a comprehensive international spirits competition, Sangster's won a gold medal against these liqueurs.

The liqueur has an alcohol content at 15% alcohol by volume.
