= Café Rica =

Costa Rican coffee-flavored liqueur

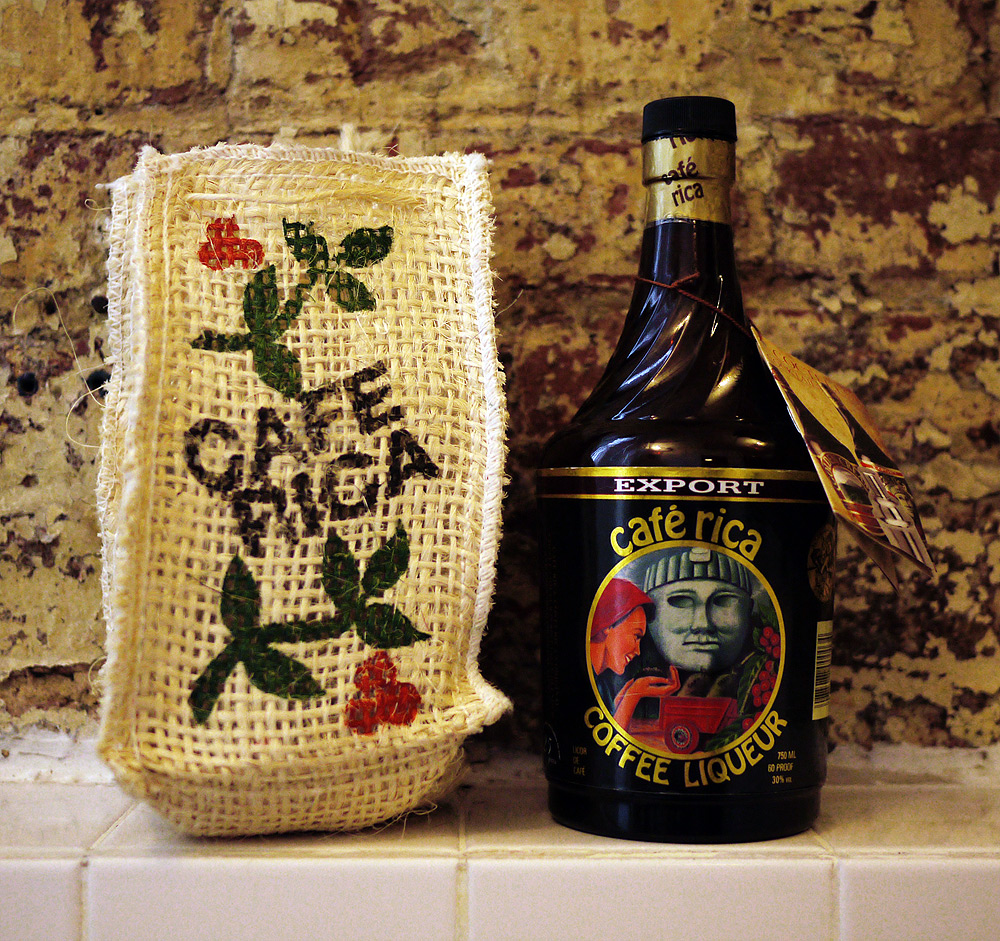
- A bottle of Café Rica and the woven bag it comes in
- Type: Liqueur
- Manufacturer: Salicsa
- Origin: Costa Rica
- Introduced: 1978
- Alcohol by volume: 30.0%
- Website: www.salicsa.com/productos/licores.html

Café Rica is a Costa Rican coffee-flavored liqueur. It is thick and sweet with a strong coffee flavor from which it gets its namesake. It is made from coffee harvested in Costa Rica.

== History ==
Café Rica was created by a Jamaican businessman named Edward Drew in 1978 as the first product of Costa Rican company Salicsa.

== Uses ==
Café Rica can be used in much the same way as any other coffee liqueur such as Kahlúa, though recipes may need to be slightly adjusted as Café Rica contains 10% more abv than Kahlúa.

== See also ==
- List of cocktails
- List of coffee liqueurs
