= Rusty nail (cocktail) =

Cocktail mixing Drambuie and Scotch whisky

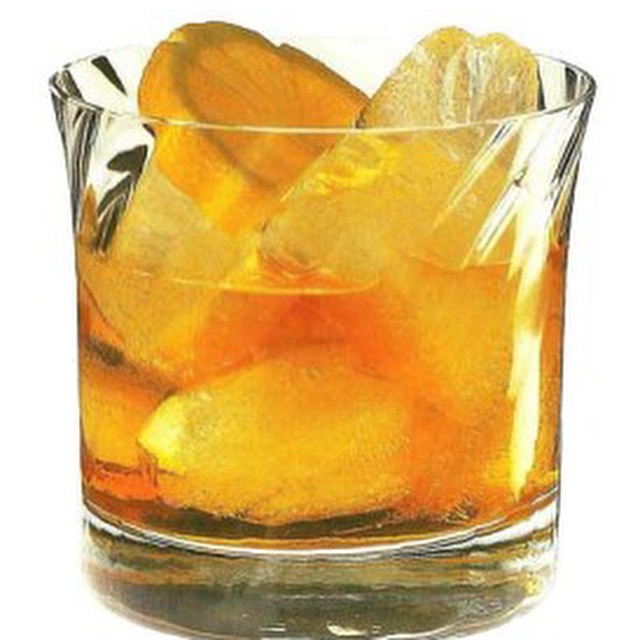
- Rusty nail
- Type: Cocktail
- Ingredients: 45 ml Scotch whisky; 25 ml Drambuie
- Base spirit: Scotch whisky, Drambuie
- Standard drinkware: Old fashioned glass
- Standard garnish: Orange peel (optional) (Note: IBA calls for lemon zest)
- Served: On the rocks: poured over ice
- Preparation: Pour all ingredients directly into an old fashioned glass filled with ice. Stir gently.

A rusty nail is a cocktail made by mixing Scotch whisky with Drambuie in a ratio ranging from 1:1 to 2:1. It is typically served on the rocks in an old-fashioned glass (also known as a rocks glass), though it can be served "up" in a stemmed glass. The cocktail's origin goes back to the 1937 British Industries Fair, but it gained widespread popularity in the 1950s after being endorsed by New York's 21 Club. Its prominence grew further a decade later when it became the go-to cocktail of the Rat Pack.

== Variations ==
Variations of the drink can be made using any aged spirit with the Drambuie (its one essential ingredient), although using blended Scotch whisky in a 1 to 1 or 2 to 1 ratio is traditional. The addition of additional Drambuie tends to sweeten the cocktail. The cocktail can be garnished with a twist of citrus, usually orange, that will enhance the acidity and flavor.

Other variations include:

- The rusty compass, adds cherry liqueur to the rusty nail mix
- Another smoky nail that is known in Spanish as the clavo ahumado; it uses mezcal instead of whisky
- The Donald Sutherland substituted Canadian rye whisky for the blended Scotch whisky

== History ==
According to cocktail historian David Wondrich, "...the Rusty Nail took a while to find its proper place in the world". The combination of Drambuie—"the world's most distinguished Scotch-based liqueur"—and the whisky it is made from first appears in 1937 in the form of the B.I.F., credited to one F. Benniman and ostensibly named after the British Industries Fair. Wondrich goes on to note that "it took another generation or so for the drink to assume its classic name and form, during which time it tried on several identities. Here it's a D&S...there a Little Club No. 1 (the Little Club being a rather swank sort of joint on East Fifty-fifth Street much haunted by showbiz types); at USAF Officers' Clubs in Thailand and the Republic of Viet-Nam, [sic] it's a Mig-21, while in the upper Midwest it's a Knucklehead."

The cocktail authority Dale DeGroff said "the Rusty Nail is often credited to the clever bartenders at the 21 Club in Manhattan sometime in the early 1960s" The cocktail's name was finally cemented in 1963, when Gina MacKinnon, the chairwoman of the Drambuie Liqueur Company, gave the rusty nail her endorsement in The New York Times. DeGroff reported that in the early 1960s "...the Rat Pack was enamored of the drink, which may have been responsible for the wide appeal in those years."
