= Altvater =

Altvater is a surname of German origin. Notable people with the surname include:

- Catherine Tharp Altvater (1907–1984), American painter
- Elmar Altvater (1938–2018), German political scientist
- Heinrich Altvater (1902–1994), German footballer
- Wilhelm Altvater (1920–2001), German politician

== See also ==
- Altvater, German name for Praděd, mountain in the Czech Republic
- Gessler (company)
