= Glayva =

Liqueur based on Scotch whisky and honey

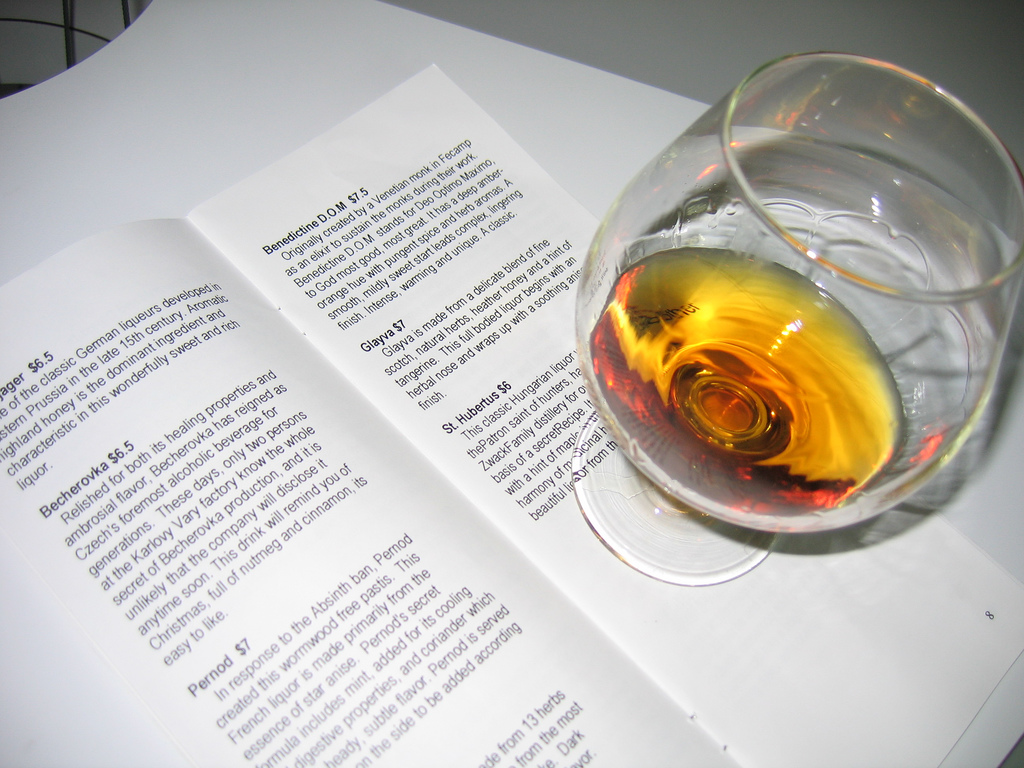
Glayva

Glayva is a liqueur originally produced in 1947 in Leith, Edinburgh, Scotland by Ronald Morrison & Co Ltd and now by Whyte and Mackay Ltd.

Glayva is made from a blend of aged Scotch whiskies, a selected range of spices, Mediterranean tangerines, cinnamon, almonds and honey. It has a deep golden colour and a distinctive flavour.

== History ==
Glayva was first produced and sold in 1947 by wine and whisky merchant Ronald Morrison. Like Drambuie, its ingredients include honey and spices mixed with Scotch malt whisky. The name originates from a Gaelic phrase, "Glè Mhath", meaning "very good".

== See also ==
- List of liqueurs
