= Drambuie =

Sweet, golden coloured liqueur made from Scotch whisky

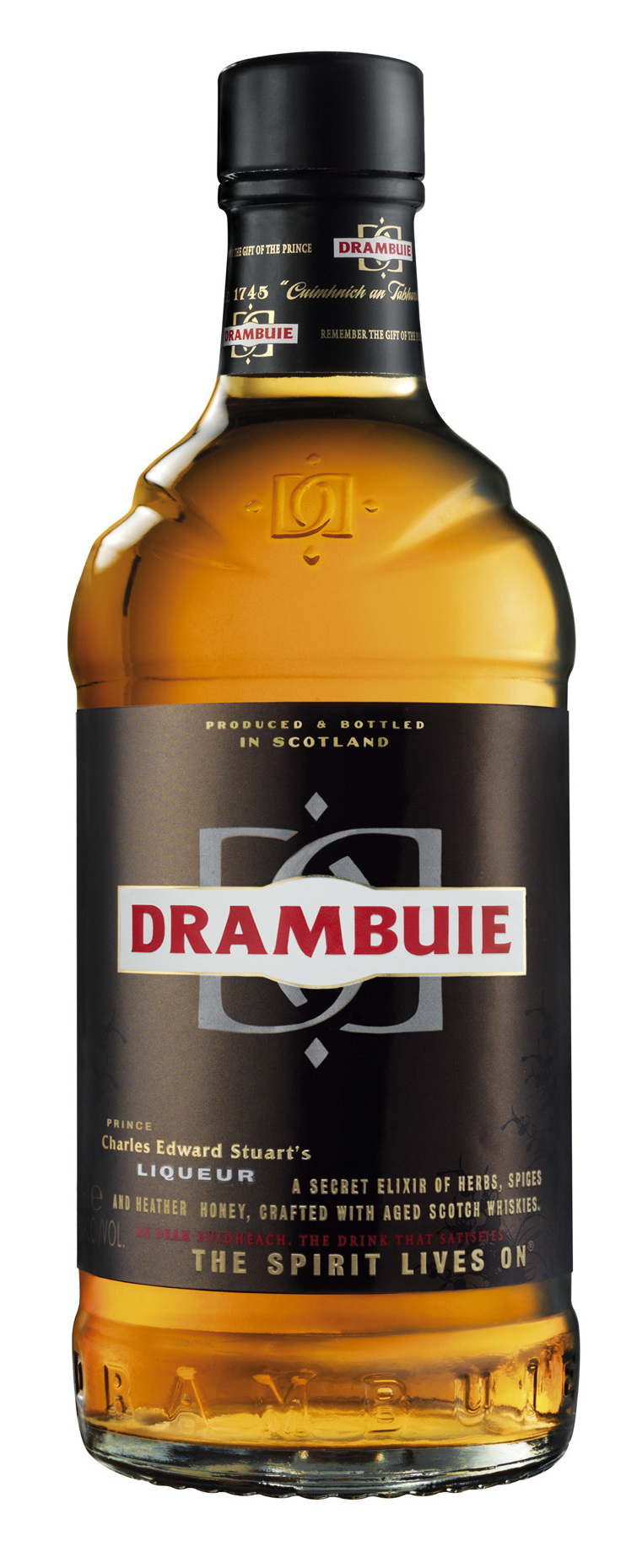
- Bottle of Drambuie with contemporary packaging
- Type: Liqueur
- Manufacturer: The Drambuie Liqueur Company Limited
- Origin: Scotland
- Introduced: 1910
- Alcohol by volume: 40%
- Colour: Gold
- Ingredients: Scotch whisky, heather honey, spices and herbs
- Website: www.drambuie.com

Drambuie /dræmˈbuːi/ is a golden-coloured, 40% ABV liqueur made from Scotch whisky, heather honey, herbs and spices. The brand was owned by the MacKinnon family for 100 years, and was bought by William Grant & Sons in 2014.

== Etymology ==
The name Drambuie possibly derives from the Scottish Gaelic phrase an dram buidheach ("the drink that satisfies"), a claim made by the drink's original manufacturer.

== History ==
=== Legend ===
After the Battle of Culloden in 1746, Prince Charles Edward Stuart, also called Bonnie Prince Charlie, fled to the isle of Skye. There, he was given sanctuary by Captain John MacKinnon of Clan MacKinnon. According to family legend, after staying with the captain, the prince rewarded him with this prized drink recipe. This version of events is disputed by historians who believe it to be a story concocted to boost sales of the drink.

Legend holds that Clan MacKinnon gave the recipe to John Ross in the late 19th century. After John Ross's death in 1879, his son James Ross, a businessman and owner of the Broadford Hotel in Broadford on Skye, began to experiment with the recipe.

=== Private production ===
Drambuie is a sweet, golden-coloured 40% ABV liqueur made from Scotch whisky, heather honey, herbs, and spices.

In the 1880s, Ross developed and improved the recipe, changing the original brandy base to Scotch whisky, initially for his friends and then later for hotel patrons. Ross named the concoction Drambuie and sold it further afield, eventually reaching markets in France and the United States. As the drink became better known, Ross registered the name as a trademark in 1893.

To fund their children's education after Ross died, his widow Eleanor Ross sold the recipe to another member of the MacKinnon family. Malcolm "Calum" MacKinnon worked with Eleanor Ross to continue making the drink and experimented with the recipe.

By 1912, Calum MacKinnon's employers, Macbeth & Son, bought the recipe from the Ross family, but the company soon ran into financial problems. In 1914, MacKinnon's fiancée, Gina Russell Davidson, encouraged him to buy the failing business and to create the Drambuie Liquor Company. The couple married in 1915, and Gina MacKinnon became the sole custodian of the Drambuie recipe, taking on the responsibility for collecting the ingredients and mixing the drink in her kitchen.

The company expanded and, following Callum MacKinnon's death in 1945, Gina MacKinnon became Chair of the company and further expanded the business, particularly with exports to the United States. The MacKinnon family produced the drink until the company was sold in 2014.

== Modern production ==
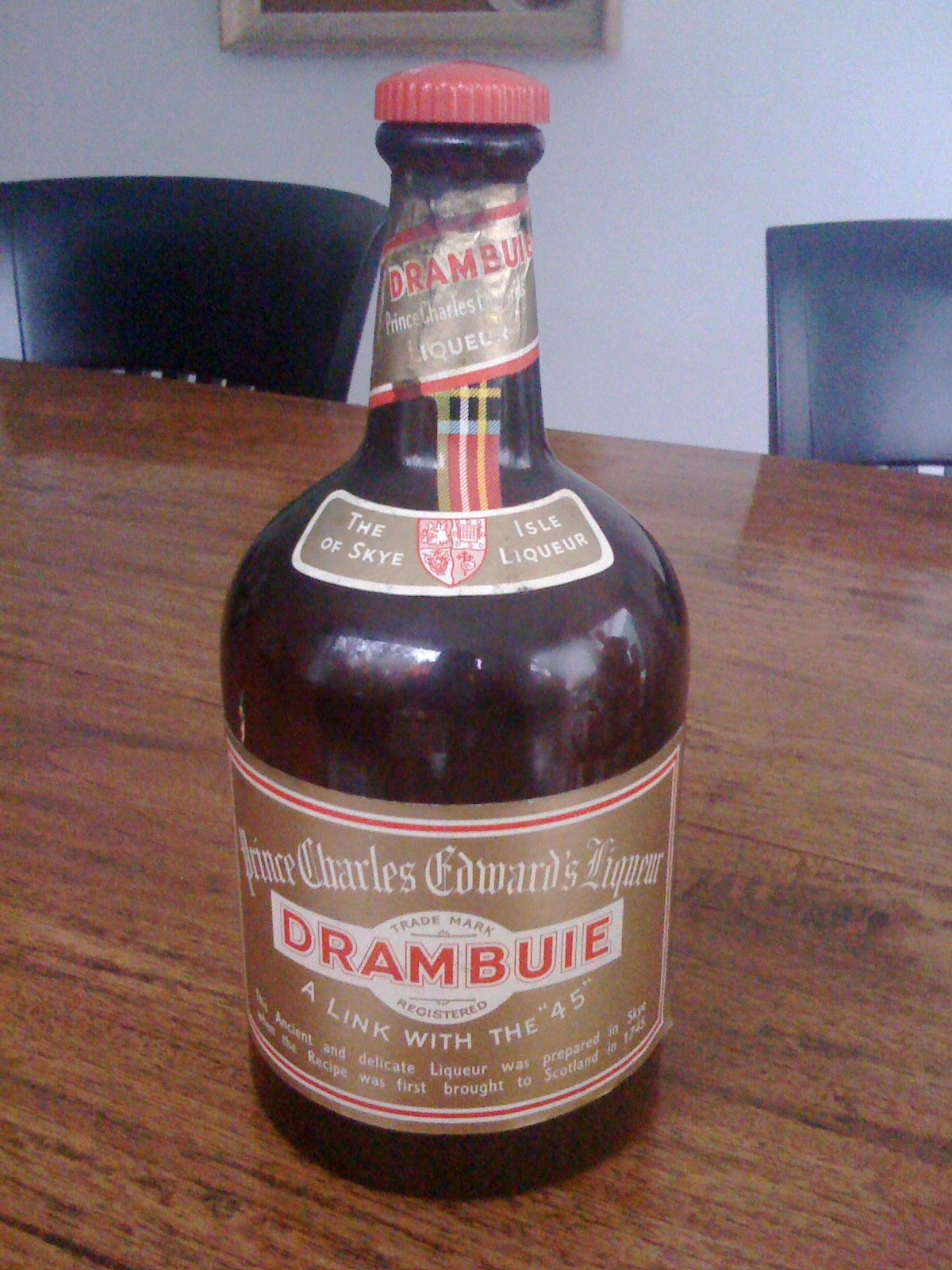
Drambuie in an older packaging style

Drambuie was first commercially produced on Union Street in Edinburgh in 1910. Only twelve cases were originally sold. In 1916, Drambuie became the first liqueur allowed in the cellars of the House of Lords, and it began shipping worldwide to British Army officers' messes.

Around 1940, the company moved to bonded premises in Dublin Street Lane, where the liquor was compounded (the process of flavouring and sweetening the whisky spirit). The bottling plant was in the same lane while the company office was in York Place. After a short period at nearby Broughton Market, the operation moved to premises at the foot of Easter Road in Leith in 1955. Further expansion led to a move to purpose-built premises on the western edge of Kirkliston in 1959. These premises were vacated in 2001 and thereafter production was contracted out, in the first instance to the Glenmorangie bottling plant at Broxburn and, in 2010, to Morrison Bowmore Distillers.

Since 2007, work has been done to strengthen the brand's reputation after a downturn in popularity and sales.

In 2009, Drambuie launched The Royal Legacy of 1745, an upscale malt whisky liqueur. The 40% alcohol by volume spirit won the Drinks International Travel Retail Award for Best Travel Retail Drinks Launch at the TFWA, Cannes, France, in October 2009.

To celebrate the centenary of Drambuie being bottled in Edinburgh, the makers launched a new bottle style and embarked on a television and print advertising campaign in 2010. The new bottle, which is clear, allows the colour of the liqueur to be seen. It has a new interlocking "DD" Drambuie icon behind the brand name, which also appears on the neck.

In September 2014, Drambuie was sold to the makers of Glenfiddich, William Grant and Sons, for an estimated £100 million.

It was produced under contract at the Morrison Bowmore Distillers facility at Springburn Bond, Glasgow, from 2010 until 2019, when production was transitioned to the William Grant and Sons bottling facility.

== Reviews ==
Recent awards for Drambuie include

- Gold medal 95 points at the IWSC
- 2020 Double gold at the ISC
- 2019 Gold medal at the ISC

Drambuie received the highest possible score, a "96–100", in the Wine Enthusiast's 2008 spirit ratings competition.

== Use in beverages ==
Notable cocktails which use Drambuie include:

- The Rusty Nail, and its variations
- Royal Rob Roy

== See also ==
- Glayva
- List of liqueurs
