= Toussaint Coffee Liqueur =

Haitian liqueur

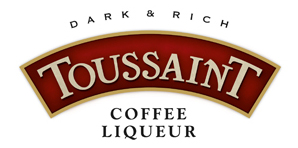
- Type: Liqueur
- Manufacturer: G&J Distillers
- Distributor: Quintessential Brands
- Origin: Haiti
- Alcohol by volume: 30.0%
- Proof (US): 60
- Website: toussaint-liqueur.com

Toussaint Coffee Liqueur (French pronunciation: [tusɛ̃]) is a coffee-flavoured liqueur prepared with a rum base that originated in Haiti, commemorating the revolutionary hero Toussaint Louverture. Its alcohol by volume content is 30%.

== History ==
Toussaint was first developed by Anker Horn (08/08/1936 - 09/07/2026) and his family in Haiti in the late 1970s. It is prepared with arabica coffee beans, aged three-year rum made from the sugarcane, and a combination of cocoa, vanilla, and liquorice flavours. In the late 1990s Anker and his son Aloysius launched the drink across Scandinavia, Europe, Haiti and Australia. Toussaint gained a considerable amount of success, especially in the United Kingdom. In 2013, the company was bought by Quintessential Brands, which redesigned its brand, relaunched and moved production to England in the G&J Distillers distillery to ensure a reliable supply and consistent quality. Marbelhead Brand Development distributes the liqueur, and was responsible for its reintroduction in the United Kingdom.

== Awards ==
Touissant was awarded 5+ stars, the highest rating by the renowned Difford's Guide in 2013. In 2014, the Global Rum Masters awarded it Gold for flavored rum and in 2015, gave it the Master Medal for complex.

=== Cocktail ===
In 2013, the cocktail L'Ouverture named and prepared by Nicci Stringfellow, a representative for Marblehead distributors using Toussaint as the principal, has won Gold in the Drinks International Cocktail Challenge.

== Competition ==
In April 2014 in the United Kingdom, Toussaint Coffee Liqueur introduced a competition for bartenders to create a cocktail using the liqueur, as well as a dish that incorporates the liqueur.

== See also ==
- List of coffee liqueurs
