= Bärenfang =

German honey-flavoured liqueur

A bottle of Bärenjäger, a brand of Bärenfang produced in Germany and bottled at 35% ABV.

Bärenfang or Meschkinnes is a German honey-flavoured liqueur based on vodka. It is usually available in English-speaking countries as Teucke & Koenig Bärenjäger, a commercial brand of Bärenfang.

Bärenfang means 'bear trap'; Bärenjäger means 'bear hunter'. Meschkinnes, a term mostly used by people from East Prussia, comes from Lithuanian meškinas, meaning 'male bear'.

Bärenfang has an alcohol content of 30%–45% ABV (60–90 proof). In Germany, Bärenfang is often made at home because the basic recipe and many variations are readily available. Most homemade Bärenfang is based on vodka, but some recipes with higher alcohol content use neutral spirit.

Bärenfang is always made with honey from nectar because honey from honeydew may have a bitter aftertaste.

== History ==
Bärenfang was first developed in East Prussia in the 15th century. Monasteries were integral to its early production and development. It was the first commercial brand of this liqueur that was produced in the capital city of Königsberg; it is now produced by the Teucke & Koenig company in the town of Steinhagen, Germany. A picture of a fur trapper trapping a bear is shown on bottles of Teucke & Koenig's Bärenjäger.

Today, Teucke & Koenig is owned by Schwarze & Schlichte, located in the town of Oelde in North Rhine-Westphalia, Germany. Schwarze & Schlichte also make another brand of Bärenfang that is bottled at 33% ABV (66 proof).

The Bärenfang produced by Teucke & Koenig is widely exported. It is usually sold under the brand name Bärenjäger outside of Germany. Other producers of Bärenfang exist in Germany, but their products are less often available in other countries.

== Awards ==
Bärenjäger has been reviewed by the San Francisco World Spirits Competition, which gave it gold and silver medals in 2011 and 2012, respectively. Wine Enthusiast rated Bärenjäger in its "85–89" category.

Proof66's averaging of these scores produced an overall score that classified it as a "Tier 1" spirit.

== See also ==
- Schnapps
