= Sève Fournier =

Sève Fournier is a liqueur that was created in 1832 by Ernest Fournier. It is based on cocoa sap and cognac, and is produced in the Cognac region in France.
