= Guignolet =

French cherry liqueur

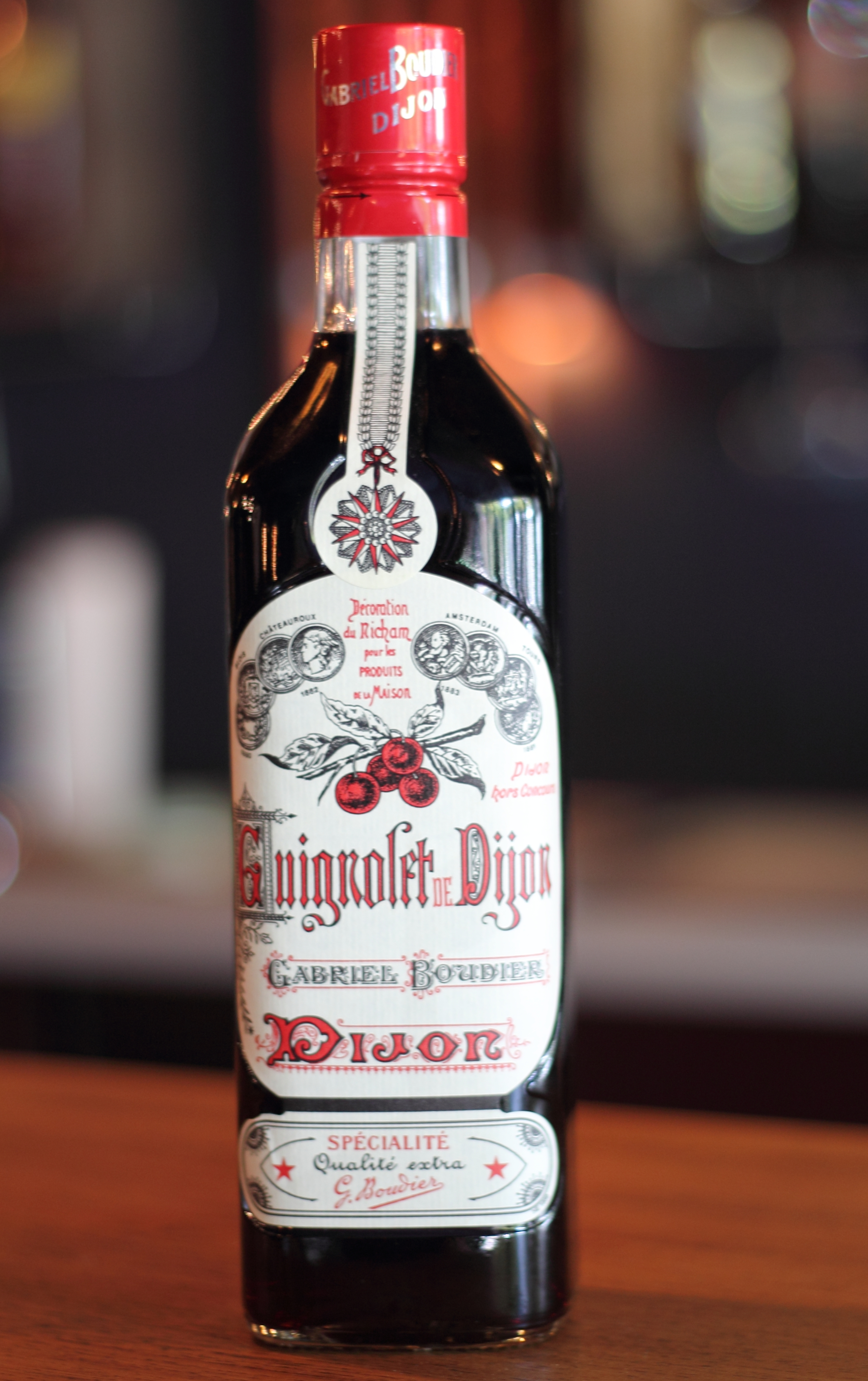
Guignolet de Dijon

Guignolet (pronounced [ɡiɲɔlɛ]) is a French wild cherry liqueur.

It is widely available in France, including at supermarkets such as Casino and others, but is not widely available internationally.

A leading producer is the company Giffard in Angers, France, the same town where Cointreau is produced. The Cointreau brothers were instrumental in its reinvention, the original recipe having been lost.

== Composition and etymology ==
It obtains its name from guigne, one of a few species of cherry used in its production. (Black cherries and sour cherries are also used.) It has an alcohol content between 16 and 18° proof (ca. 12%), an aroma vaguely reminiscent of whiskey, and a very sweet taste.

== Uses ==
It is drunk neat as an aperitif.

The cocktail guignolo is composed of guignolet, champagne and cherry juice.

== Literature Mentions ==
Jules Romains mentions the liqueur in his novel Les Copains (Éditions Gallimard,1922). The innkeeper responds to Broudier et Bénin: "Je n'ai justement plus de fine, mes bons messieurs; mais j'ai encore du guignolet." In Fred Vargas's thriller An Uncertain Place, two of the characters share a guignolet every night, accompanied by winkles picked out by each with his personal pin, one with a blue head, one with an orange head. Jean Giraud aka Moebius has "The Major" consume a "Kirch Guignolet" (sic) in his graphic novel The Hunted Hunter, a tie-in to his acclaimed work The Airtight Garage.

Audric Baillard, a key recurring character in Kate Mosse's Languedoc trilogy of books (Labyrinth, Sepulchre and Citadel) is especially fond of Guignolet.
