= Wilhelm Altvater =

German politician

Member of the Bundestag
- In office 22 December 1960 – 15 October 1961

Personal details
- Born: 12 August 1920 Todtenhausen
- Died: 4 February 2001 (aged 80)
- Party: SPD

Wilhelm Altvater (12 August 1920 – 4 February 2001) was a German politician of the Social Democratic Party (SPD) and former member of the German Bundestag.

== Life ==
Altvater had been a member of the SPD since 1946. He was a member of the German Bundestag from September 22, 1960, when he succeeded the SPD in North Rhine-Westphalia as state representative for the late Hugo Rasch, until 1961.

== Literature ==
Herbst, Ludolf; Jahn, Bruno (2002). Vierhaus, Rudolf (ed.). Biographisches Handbuch der Mitglieder des Deutschen Bundestages. 1949–2002 [Biographical Handbook of the Members of the German Bundestag. 1949–2002] (in German). München: De Gruyter - De Gruyter Saur. p. 1715. ISBN 978-3-11-184511-1.
