= Coole Swan Irish Cream Liqueur =

Whiskey, white chocolate and cream drink

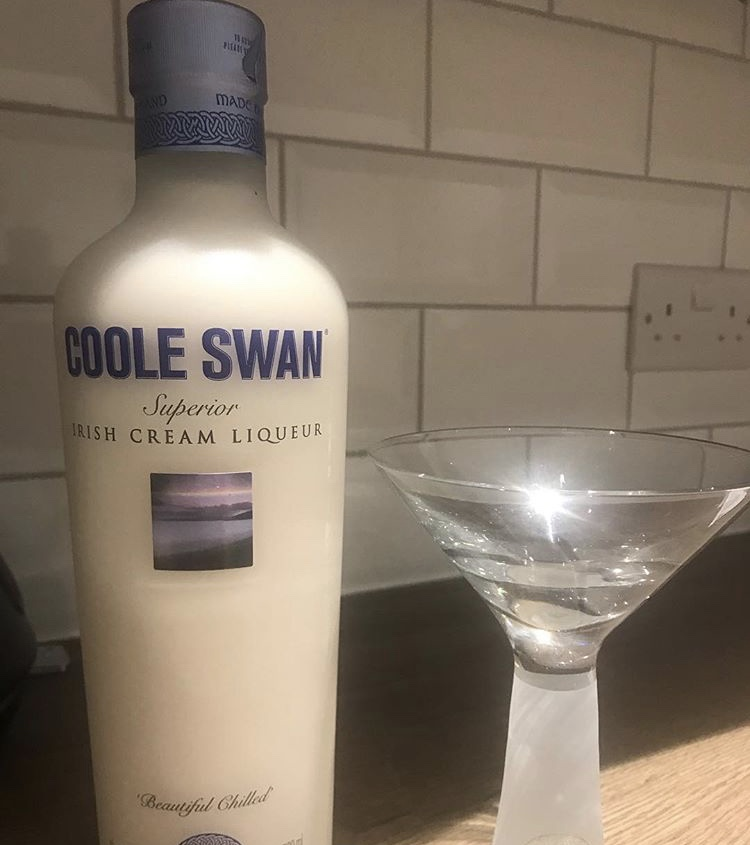
- Type: Liqueur
- Manufacturer: The Scion Spirits Company Ltd.
- Origin: Republic of Ireland
- Introduced: 2007
- Alcohol by volume: 16.0%
- Ingredients: Irish cream, Irish whiskey, Belgian chocolate, Sugar, Emulsifier, Stabiliser
- Website: cooleswan.com

Coole Swan Irish Cream Liqueur is an Irish cream produced from a blend of a single-malt Irish whiskey, Belgian white chocolate, and fresh cream. Its alcohol content is 16 percent by volume. Made in Ireland, Coole Swan has headquarters on the owners' family farm in County Meath and is bottled in Bailieborough, County Cavan.

== History ==
Coole Swan launched in Ireland in March 2007. To mark the occasion, British film director Mike Figgis created "Coole Stories" a series of short films, specifically for the brand's debut. Irish chef Neven Maguire is a known supporter of Coole Swan, often making his desserts with the liqueur.

== Bottle ==
Based on the Victorian Milk Bottles, the glass bottles are produced by Hrastnik in Slovenia and decorated in Poland by Dekor Glass.

== Manufacture ==
Callebaut Belgian white chocolate is added to fresh milked cream. The two are then blended in a heating process. Finally, the single malt Irish whiskey is poured into this mix.

== Awards ==
Since its launch, Coole Swan has won a number of awards and accolades, including Best Liqueur and a Double Gold at the San Francisco World Spirits Competition.

== See also ==
- Irish cream
- Irish coffee
