= Garluche =

French liqueur, commonly served as an aperitif

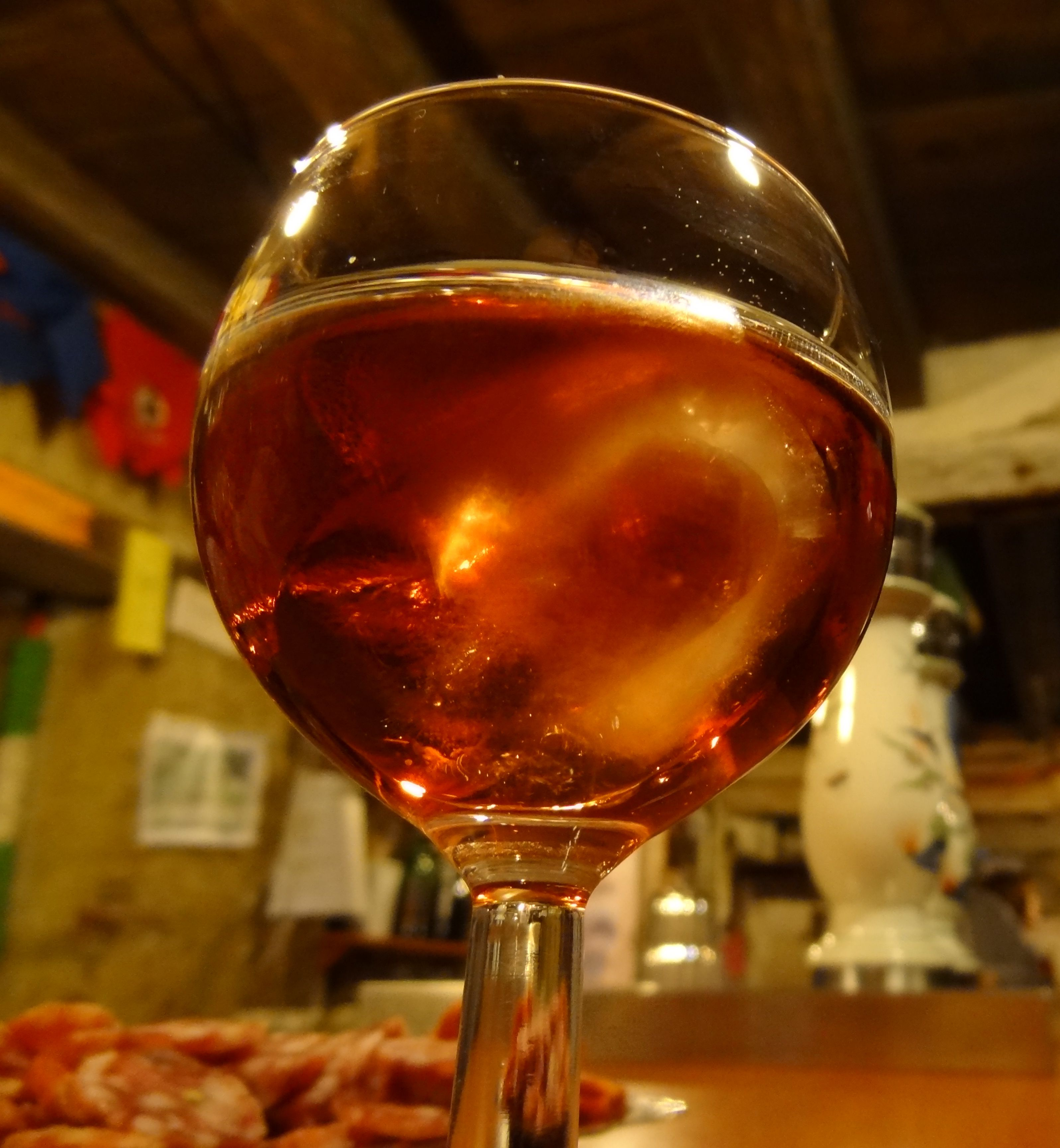
Garluche

Garluche is a French liqueur and apéritif.

== Etymology ==
Garluche is named after the similarly coloured French endemic variety of sandstone that has long served as a construction material. That name in turn derives from the Gascon garluisha, derived from pre-Latin root kar / gar. Its literal meaning is "the wrong stone."

== Alcohol ==
Garluche is made of white wine, rum and bitter orange peel. Sometimes the white wine can be replaced with champagne or cremant from Bordeaux.
