= Vermeer Dutch Chocolate Cream Liqueur =

Vermeer Dutch Chocolate Cream Liqueur is a sweet liqueur made of Dutch chocolate, cream, and vodka. It was created by Maurice Kanbar who tested it for five years before presenting the liqueur to the public in 2001. Vermeer is 34 U.S. proof (17% alcohol by volume) and the bottles are labeled with an image of Johannes Vermeer's Girl with a Pearl Earring.

Kanbar, who also developed SKYY vodka, wanted to create "a liqueur as perfect as a Vermeer painting." The Vermeer liqueur benefited from the popularity of chocolate in the early 2000s, and was included in the "Chocolate Shows" (held annually in New York City since 1998) of 2001 and 2002.

Vermeer is served with ice (on the rocks), or it can be mixed in a chocolate martini cocktail or added to coffee or hot chocolate. It is also used to create sauces, such as for ice cream.

== Recognition ==
Gambit Weekly praised it as "ridiculously silky", and the Chicago Sun-Times gave positive reviews to two different cocktails made with the liqueur—the "Coco Colado" (3 oz. Vermeer, 1 oz. coconut rum, 2 oz. milk poured over ice and garnished with orange or pineapple slice and cherry) and the "Vermeer Valentine" (2 oz. Vermeer, 1 oz. vodka, and 1/2 oz. Chambord, shaken over ice)
