= X-Rated Fusion =

French vodka and fruit based liqueur

X-Rated Fusion Liqueur is a French vodka and fruit based liqueur, made by the Campari Group. It has a declared alcohol content of 17% alcohol by volume.

First introduced into the U.S. in 2005, X-Rated Fusion Liqueur has subsequently been launched in Japan by Suntory, Canada, and several other countries in Europe and Asia.

In September 2006, X-Rated Fusion Liqueur was named Best New Spirit of the Year by over 250 US retailers for Market Watch Leaders.

== Manufacture ==
X-Rated Fusion Liqueur is a blend of French vodka, Provence blood orange, mango, and passion fruit.

== Drinking ==
X-Rated Fusion Liqueur can be drunk over ice or as part of a cocktail.

== Cocktails containing X-Rated Fusion Liqueur ==
- X-Rated Flirtini
- Tickled Pink
- X-Rated Rita
- X-Boyfriend shot

== Range development ==
In 2006, the then brand-owners, Daucourt, introduced a so-called "sister product", X-Rated Vodka, which is based on similar technology to the same company's premium product Jean-Marc XO Vodka.
