= Tubi 60 =

Liqueur

- Type: Spirit
- Manufacturer: Tubi 60 Co., Ltd.
- Origin: Israel
- Introduced: 2012
- Alcohol by volume: 30.0%
- Proof (US): 60
- Variants: Tubi Night, Nova one
- Website: www.tubi60.com

Tubi 60 is a citrus based liquor and is either 30% or 40% alcohol by volume. The drink is developed and produced in Israel utilizing local herbs, fruits and spices.

== History and origin ==
Tubi 60 was developed in 2012 by two brothers: Hilal and Yanai Tubi in Haifa, Israel.

In 2013 the first distillery was opened in Haifa and obtained necessary approvals, licenses, and legal documents from the Israeli Health Ministry to produce Tubi 60. The liquor is also approved by the TTB.

Increased demand throughout the following year led to the founding of a larger distillery in 2015 by the two brothers. In 2017, the Tubi company started exporting the liquor to the US, Hungary, Norway, Germany and other countries.

== Composition and taste ==
Tubi 60 is made of lemon as well as other local citrus fruits. It is infused with herbs, spices, tree and flower extracts, including ginger, mint, anise, saffron, turmeric and cumin. Tubi 60 is most commonly served as a shot or a shooter, or mixed with tonic water or seltzer. The makers of Tubi 60 claim the ingredients leave the consumer with a "refreshing and uplifting feeling".

== Marketing ==
Tubi 60's popularity in Israel increased mainly by word of mouth. Initially spread by word of mouth through the friends and family of the two founders, it became a frequently requested drink in bars, with Jerusalem being the first city to serve it as a staple. It took until 2014 for the drink to reach Tel Aviv's bar scene. Its popularity there cemented it as a countrywide mainstay.

== See also ==
- Liqueur
- Distilled beverage
- Alcoholic drink
