= Sombai =

Cambodian rice wine manufacturer

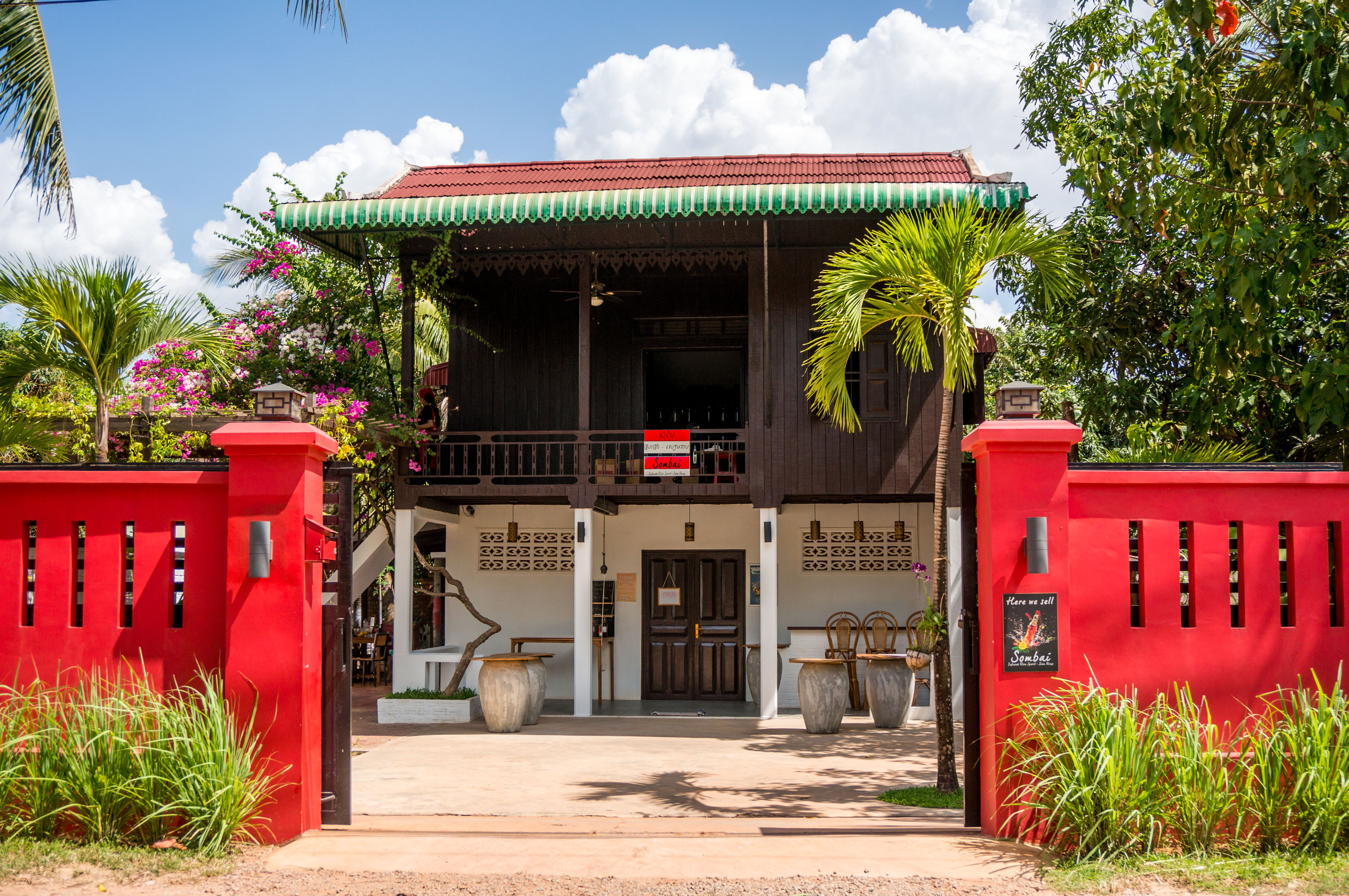
- Sombai production workshop
- Industry: Alcoholic beverages
- Founded: 2012
- Founder: Joëlle Jean-Louis and Lionel Maitrepierre
- Successor: Akim Ly
- Headquarters: Siem Reap, Cambodia
- Products: liqueur
- Website: sombai.com

Sombai (from Khmer: សុំបាយ – "some rice, please") is a liqueur manufacturer in Siem Reap founded in 2012. Its beverages have become a national drink of Cambodia and symbolic of Siem Reap. Sombai is one of the most popular brands in Cambodia.

== Products ==
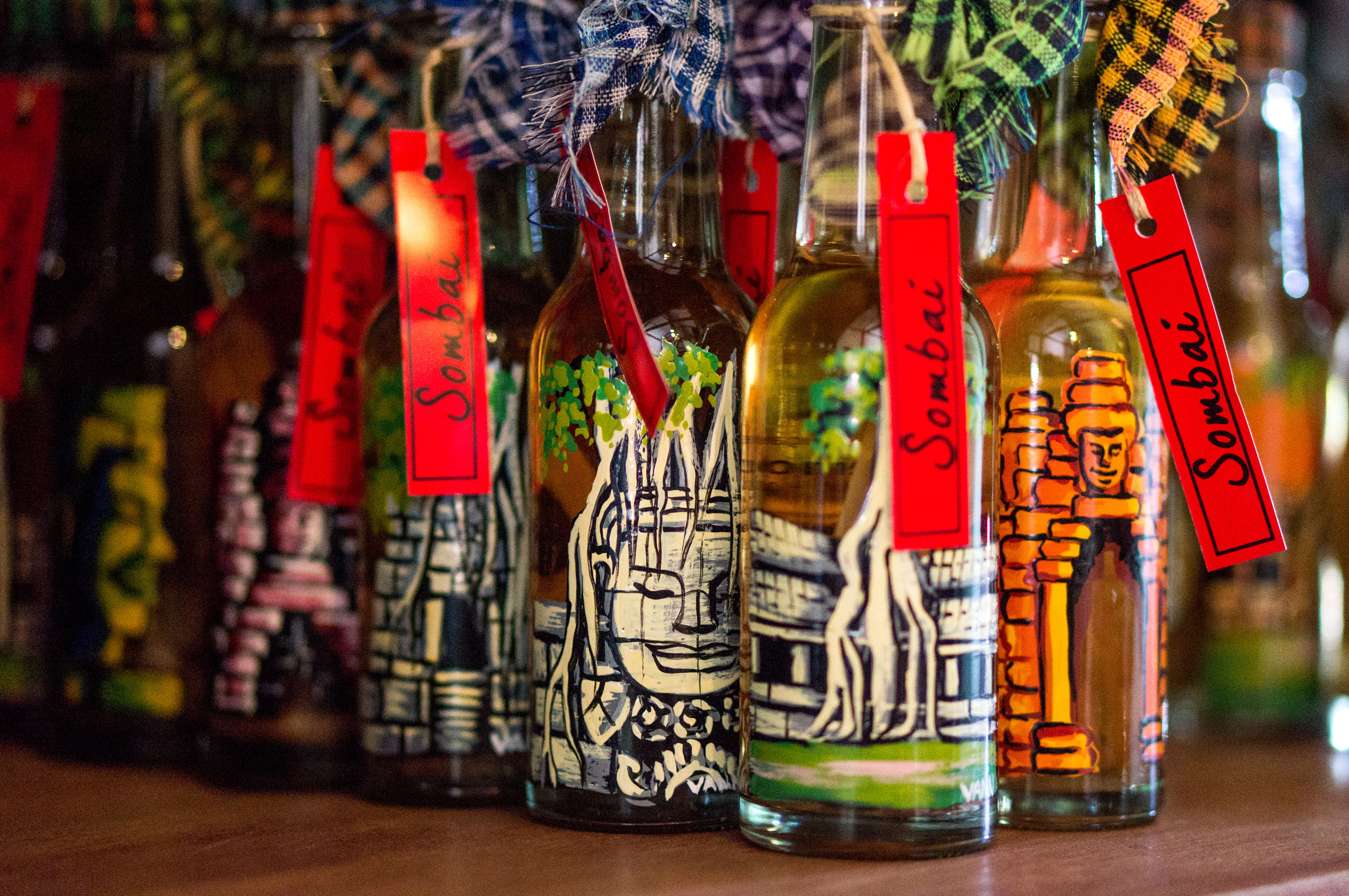
Bottles of Sombai liqueur with hand-painted images of Angkor temples

The Sombai liqueurs were created in 2012 initially from rice wine by Lionel Maitrepierre drawing inspiration from the Cambodian traditional infused rice wine sraa tram (Khmer: ស្រាត្រាំ). The Sombai bottles are hand-painted. There are 10 different flavours which are always a combination of 2 fruits or spices.

It is usually consumed either neat or on the rocks. Sombai infused rice wines is also an ingredient in several Cambodian cocktails such as Asana Sling, Lemon Lemongrass Tini, Sombai Blue, Sombai Fizz, Siem Reap Monsoon, and Sombai Sour. Several leading establishments in Siem Reap sell Sombai rice wine and its cocktails and use it in their cooking, such as Chef Pola Siv at Mie Café and the Park Hyatt, and chef Pol Kimsan at Embassy. It can also bought as a gift at Raffles Angkor.

== Production workshop ==
In 2014, a Sombai workshop and tasting parlour was set up in the artist Leang Seckon's house, and has become a tourist attraction in town. After 2022, Sombai relocated closer to the city centre and set up their workshop in a traditional wooden house in the Wat Damnak area.
