= Krupnik =

Alcoholic drink popular in Eastern Europe

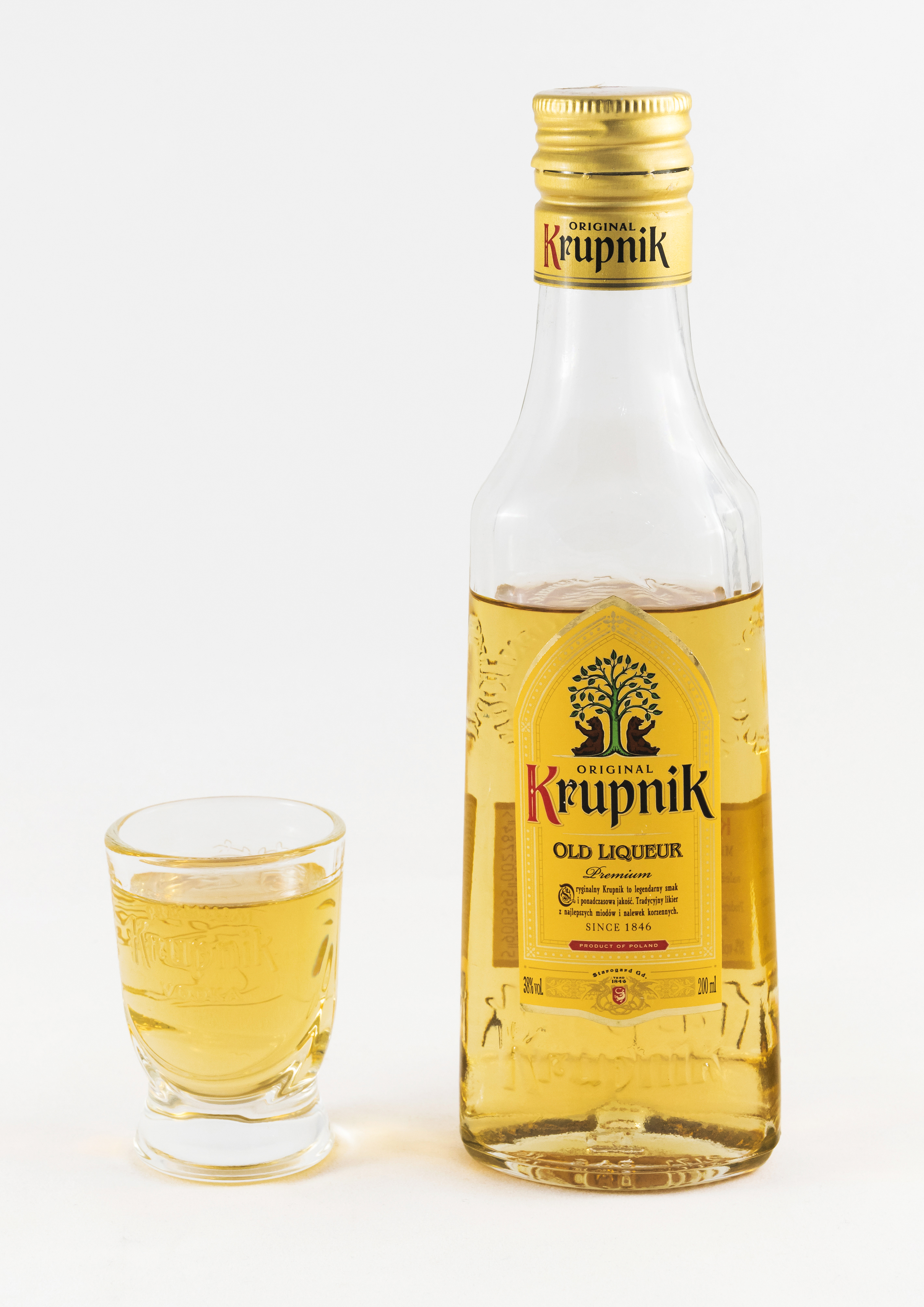
- Polish krupnik
- Type: Nalewka
- Manufacturer: Various
- Origin: Polish–Lithuanian Commonwealth
- Introduced: 16th century or earlier
- Alcohol by volume: 38% and higher (commercial versions)
- Proof (US): 80–100 (commercial versions)
- Related products: List of vodkas

Krupnik (Polish, Belarusian) or Krupnikas (Lithuanian) is a traditional sweet alcoholic drink similar to a liqueur, based on grain spirit (usually vodka) and honey, popular in Lithuania and Poland. In Poland, it is grouped in the nalewka category of alcoholic beverages. Mass-produced versions of krupnik contain 40–50% (80–100 proof) alcohol, but traditional versions use 80–100% grain alcohol as the base. Honey, usually clover honey, is the main ingredient used to add sweetness, along with up to 50 different herbs. There are many versions, and some recipes have been passed down through generations; producers typically use their own recipes.

At times, spicy seasonings and herbs are added for flavor. The honey brand and the seasoning ratio are key factors that determine the final taste of krupnik. A mixture of the honey and spices is diluted, boiled, and strained before being added to a vodka base. It may be served hot, at room temperature, or chilled. A specific sort of krupnik which contains more herbs and less honey is brewed by Karaims.

"Krupnik" is also the brand name of a range of alcoholic beverages produced by the Belvédère company, including krupnik, vodka, and various nalewki. In 2014, Krupnik vodka was the eighth most popular vodka brand in the world by sales volume.
