= Voodoo Cream Liqueur =

Voodoo Cream Liqueur is the first Indian cream liqueur, made from fresh Indian cow cream, whisky and other Italian ingredients. The trademark is owned by Nouveau group in collaboration with Flavor Chimca, Italy Voodoo cream liqueur is blended & bottled at Adinco Distillers, Goa, and was first produced in 2009. It has a declared alcohol content of 17% alcohol by volume. Voodoo Cream Liqueur is similar to Bailey's, Amarula, and Carolans.
