= Saint Brendan's =

Northern Irish cream liqueur

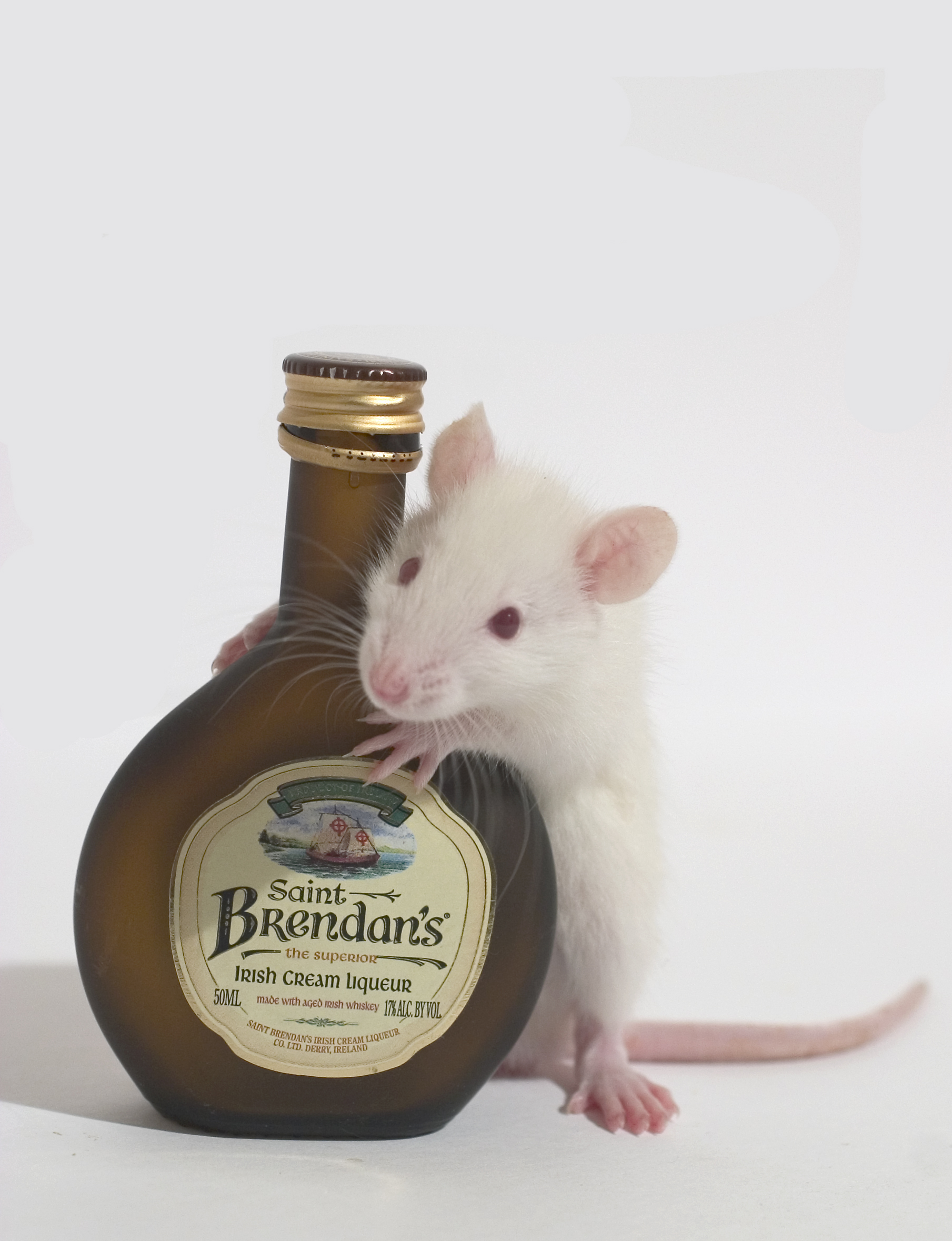
A bottle of Saint Brendan's with a rat for scale

Saint Brendan's Irish Cream Liqueur is a cream liqueur named after Saint Brendan. It is made in Derry, Northern Ireland, using locally made Irish whiskey and fresh cream.

In the 2016 United States market, Saint Brendan's ranked fifth in the cream liqueur category, behind Baileys Irish Cream, RumChata, Carolans, and E.&J. Cask & Cream.
