= Kerrygold Irish Cream Liqueur =

Irish liqueur

Kerrygold Irish Cream
- Type: Liqueur
- Manufacturer: Terra Ltd
- Distributor: Kerrygold Irish Cream Liqueur Limited.
- Origin: Ireland
- Introduced: 2014
- Alcohol by volume: 17.0%
- Ingredients: Irish cream, Irish whiskey, chocolate
- Website: kerrygoldirishcream.com

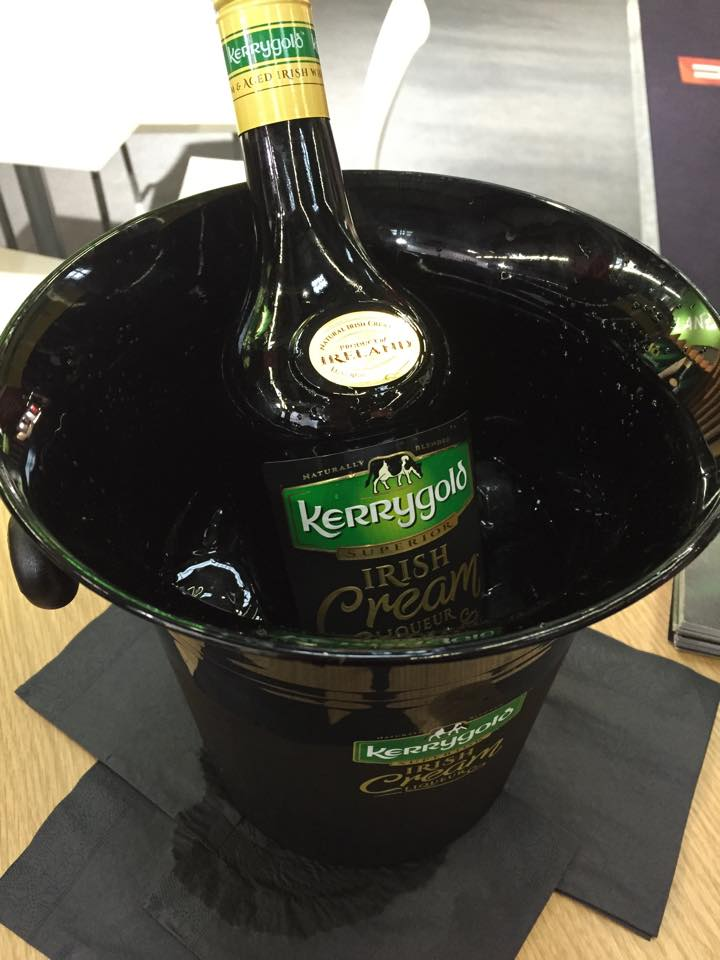
Kerrygold Irish Cream Liqueur and Ice Bucket

Kerrygold Irish Cream Liqueur is an Irish cream, Irish whiskey, and chocolate based liqueur produced in Ireland by Kerrygold Irish Cream Liqueur Limited. It was first introduced in the US in 2014 and the trademark is owned by Kerrygold under Ornua, previously known as the Irish Dairy Board. It has a declared alcohol content of 17% alcohol by volume. Infinium Spirits is the exclusive U.S. importer of Kerrygold Irish Cream Liqueur.

== History ==
In the early 2010s, the Irish Dairy Board approached the design agency Dynamo to develop and promote a cream liquor using their products. The product was intended to capitalize on Kerrygold's brand as a dairy producer and to compete with the popular Bailey's Irish Cream. The lifting of milk export quotas in Ireland also gave the company strong incentive to expand the international market for its dairy products.

In September 2014, the product launched in the United States in Florida and Illinois.

== Manufacture ==
Kerrygold Irish Cream Liqueur was created by Kerrygold in Ireland, under Ornua, an Irish dairy co-operative. In April 2015, milk quotas were lifted in Europe. Ornua was looking for more ways to export larger quantities of milk. The launching of the cream liqueur was one of the outcomes. Currently, the product is sold solely in the US, Dublin Airport and O'Briens Off Licence, in Douglas, Cork

The alcohol, chocolate, and cream from grass-fed cows, together with Irish whiskey from various distilleries, are homogenized to form an emulsion with the aid of an emulsifier, casein. This process prevents separation of the alcohol and cream during storage for up to 24 months. Without the homogenization, the fat from the cream rises to the top of the product. The quantity of other ingredients is not disclosed but they include herbs, sugar, and caramel.

== Storage and shelf life ==
Kerrygold Irish Cream Liqueurs shelf life is 2 years, stored in a refrigerator or not, but should be consumed within 6 months of opening. The product should be stored away from direct sunlight at temperatures between 0 and 25 °C (32 and 77 °F).

== Cocktails containing Kerrygold ==
- Kerry Berry
- White Rudolph
- Irish Cream Espressotini

== Awards ==
Kerrygold Irish Cream Liqueur is the winner of the 2016 World Drink Awards "World's Best Cream Liqueur Award".

== See also ==
- Irish Cream
- Irish Coffee
- Baileys
