= Tia Maria =

Dark liqueur

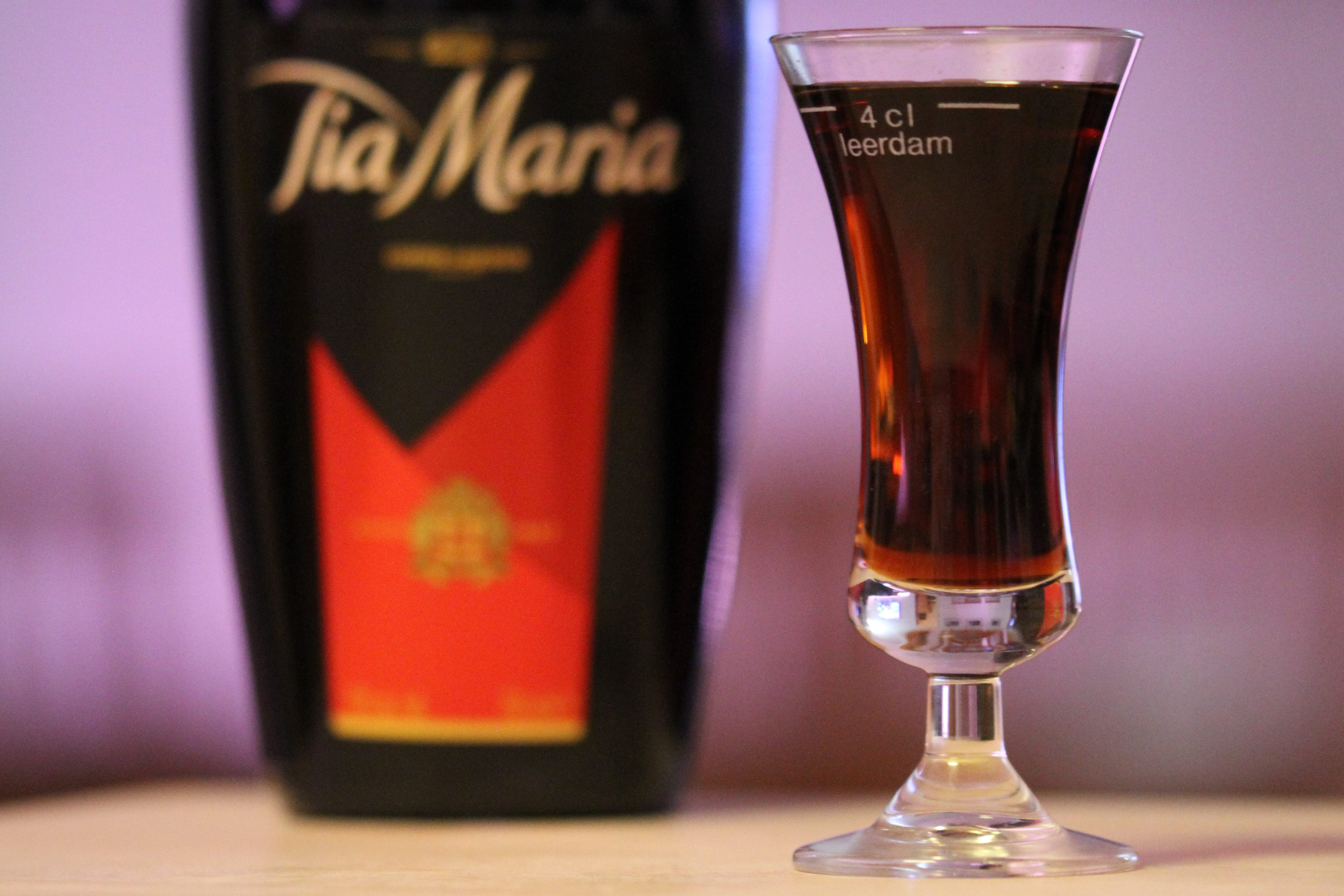
Tia Maria is a dark coffee liqueur with an alcoholic content of 20%.

Tia Maria is a dark coffee liqueur made in Italy using Jamaican coffee beans. The main ingredients are coffee beans, South Jamaican rum, vanilla, and sugar, blended to an alcoholic content of 20%.

== History ==
Tia Maria has its origins in Jamaica, where coffee liqueur had been produced for some time. In his book Jamaica Farewell, Morris Cargill recounts having had the idea for developing a coffee liqueur similar to one his aunt used to make. In 1946, he had, to no avail, tried to get the original recipe from his aunt and subsequently connected with Dr Ken Evans, who then developed the recipe. They partnered with others in Jamaica (Herbert Hart, Eustace Myers of Myers Rum, and Paul Geddes of Desnoes & Geddes) to produce the first five thousand cases, with Blue Mountain coffee supplied by Keble Munn. Cargill contracted the London ad agency J.P. MacNulty to brand the product and design the labels. They spent days trying to come up with a name, until Cargill recounted the story of trying to get his aunt's original recipe and Joseph MacNulty said, "I know exactly what we'll call that damn liqueur. Aunt Mary – Tia Maria."

Another account of its history says that a man named Dr. Evans discovered the drink after World War II, and he began reproducing it. This story of Dr. Evans' devotion to the drink is part of the official website's history, however. The Jamaican company Lascelles deMercado, producer of Appleton Rum, supposedly manufactured the concentrate from which the liqueur was made, at least, up until the time it was sold by Pernod. As recently as the 1980s, Tia Maria was made with an alcohol concentration of 31.5% and positioned as a premium liqueur compared to the substantially different product now produced at 20% ABV. In 1985, brand owners Hiram Walker sued the Kirk Line over the loss of five thousand gallons of Tia Maria it had acquired from Estate Industries in Jamaica but was spilt in an accident.

Control of the Tia Maria brand moved to Europe in 1987 when Allied-Lyons of the UK acquired Canadian spirits company Hiram Walker. The brand then became part of the Pernod Ricard portfolio in 2005 through its acquisition of rival firm Allied-Domecq. As part of a debt reduction programme, Pernod Ricard sold it to ILLVA Saronno in July 2009. Following the sale, Chivas Brothers produced it for Saronno before production was transferred to Illva Saronno's distillery in Saronno, Italy. Bacardi U.S.A., Inc. distributed it in the U.S. for Saronno. As of August 1, 2012, Kobrand became the distributor.

== Cocktails ==
Tia Maria can be consumed straight with ice but is also frequently used as an ingredient for cocktails or with coffee. It may also be mixed with milk and ice.

Some cocktails include the Tia Espresso Martini, the Dark Tia made with dark rum, the Jaffa Sam made with Tia Maria and orange juice, the Tia Maria and cola, or the Skinny Tia White Russian made with Tia Maria, vodka, and skimmed milk. Another cocktail known as Baby Guinness is Tia Maria mixed in equal parts with Baileys or another Irish cream.
