= Cork North =

Cork North or North Cork may refer to:

- North Cork (UK Parliament constituency), 1885–1922
- Cork North (Dáil constituency), 1923–1969
- Cork North Infirmary, established 1744
- North Cork Creameries, a creamery and agricultural co-op.
