= B-52 (cocktail) =

Cocktail of coffee liqueur, Irish cream, and orange-flavored liqueur

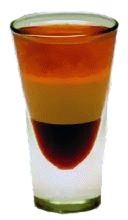
- Type: Layered shooter
- Ingredients: 2 cl Kahlúa; 2 cl Baileys Irish Cream; 2 cl Grand Marnier
- Standard drinkware: Shot glass
- Standard garnish: Stirrer
- Served: Straight up: chilled, without ice
- Preparation: Layer ingredients into a shot glass. Serve with a stirrer.

The B-52 (also B52 or Bifi or Bifty) cocktail is a layered shot composed of coffee liqueur (Kahlúa), Irish cream (Baileys Irish Cream), and Grand Marnier (in later versions replaced with triple sec or Cointreau). When prepared properly, the ingredients separate into three distinctly visible layers (due to their relative densities).

== History ==
The origins of the B-52 are not well documented, but one claim is that the B-52 was invented by Peter Fich, a head bartender at the Banff Springs Hotel in Alberta, Canada. Fich named all of his new drinks after favorite bands, albums, and songs, and he supposedly named the drink after the band of the same name, not directly after the US B-52 Stratofortress bomber or the beehive hairstyle after which the band was named.

One of Fich's first customers for a B-52 owned restaurants in various cities in Alberta, and they liked the drink so much that he put it on the menu, leading to the perception that the B-52 originated at the Keg Steakhouse in Calgary, Alberta in 1977. The B-52 is also rumoured to have been created by Adam Honigman, a bartender at New York City's Maxwell's Plum.

=== Variations ===
The B-52's widespread popularity has resulted in many variations, each earning a slightly different designation. Altogether, the drinks are referred to as the B-50 series of layered cocktails.

The drink became a North London favourite in late 2009 when Arsenal striker Nicklas Bendtner changed his shirt number from 26 to 52, earning himself the nickname "B52" in the process.

== Preparations ==
An experienced bartender usually relies on the traditional, hand-made preparation. This method of the preparation is called "building", as opposed to blending or shaking, thus, B-52s are "built."

B-52s are usually served in a shot glass or sherry glass, although a heatproof glass is required when a "flaming B-52" is served. First, a coffee liqueur, such as Tia Maria or Kahlúa, is poured into the glass. Next, Baileys Irish Cream is poured very slowly over the back of a cold bar spoon, taking care to avoid disturbing the lower layer as the second liquor is poured on top. Just as carefully, Grand Marnier is poured atop the Irish Cream using the bar spoon.

The drink is sometimes made with a shaker and served in a cocktail glass, although this is less traditional.

== Flaming B-52 ==
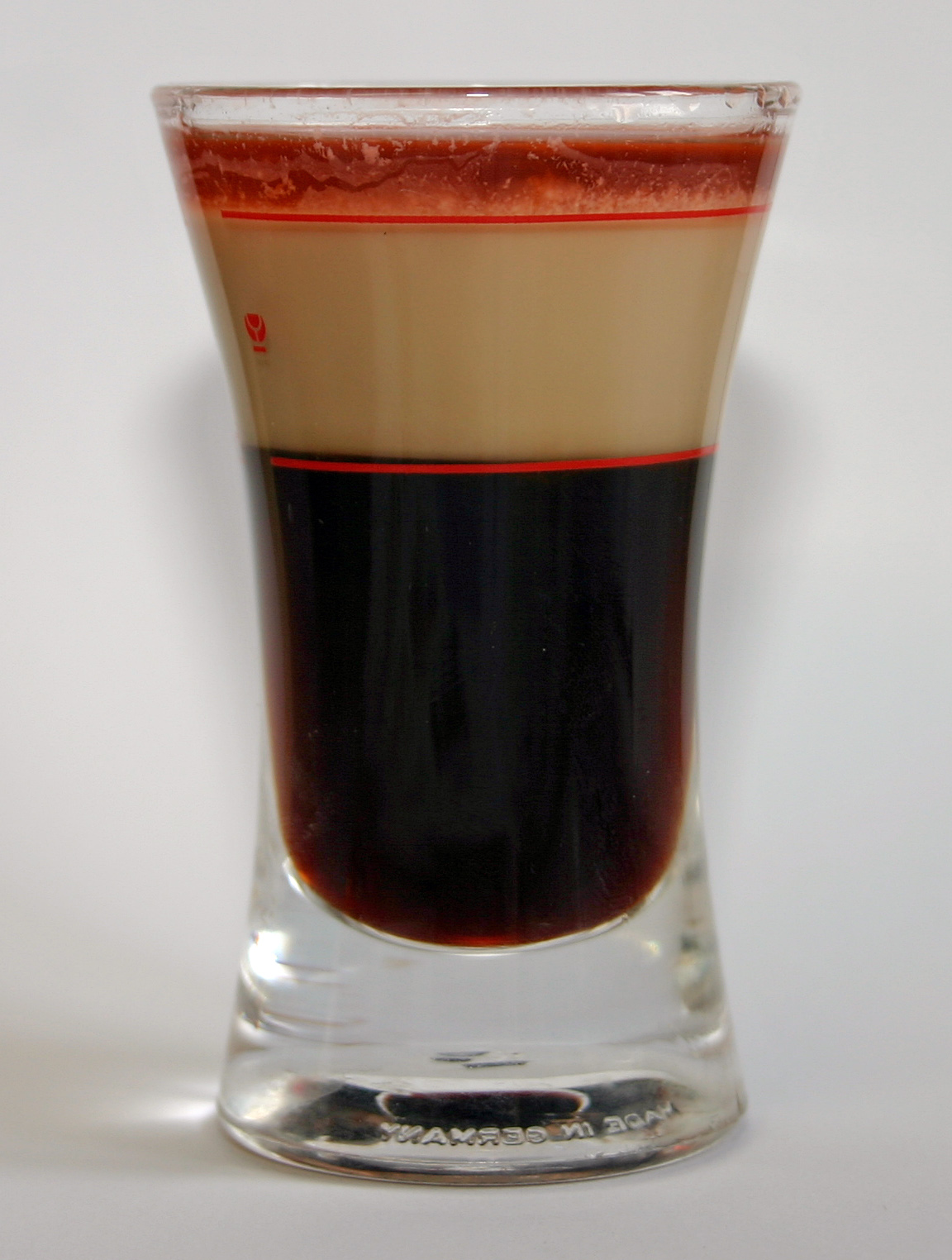
B52 with floated overproof rum

For a Flaming B-52, the top layer is ignited, producing a blue flame. Filling the glass to the top reduces the amount of glass exposed to the flames, making the glass less likely to break but easier to spill. The Triple Sec will not ignite easily at room temperature, so it is sometimes warmed up before use or topped with a small layer of an overproof rum with 65–85% ABV such as Bacardi 151 or Stroh 160. Such a preparation can be referred to as a "B-52 On a Mission".

== Variant drinks ==
- B-51, a B-52 with Frangelico hazelnut liqueur rather than triple sec
- B-52 with Bomb Bay Doors, a B-52 with a 4th layer of Bombay gin
- B-52 in the Desert, or a B-52 with a Mexican Tailgunner, a B-52 with tequila rather than Baileys Irish cream
- B-52 with a Full Payload, a B-52 with a 4th layer of Frangelico and a 5th layer of Bacardi 151 rum lit on fire
- B-53, a B-52 with Sambuca rather than Irish cream
- B-54, a B-52 with Amaretto almond liqueur in place of triple sec
- B-55, a B-52 with absinthe rather than Triple Sec, also known as B-52 Gunship
- B-56, a B-52 with blue curaçao rather than triple sec and a 4th layer of white rum lit on fire
- B-57, a B-52 with peppermint schnapps rather than Irish cream
- B-156, a B-52 but three times larger in an old fashioned glass
- Birthday Jamboree (BJ), a B-52 with whipped cream in place of Grand Marnier
- Mudslide, a B-52 with vodka in place of Grand Marnier

== See also ==
- List of cocktails
