= Carolans =

Liqueur based on Irish whiskey

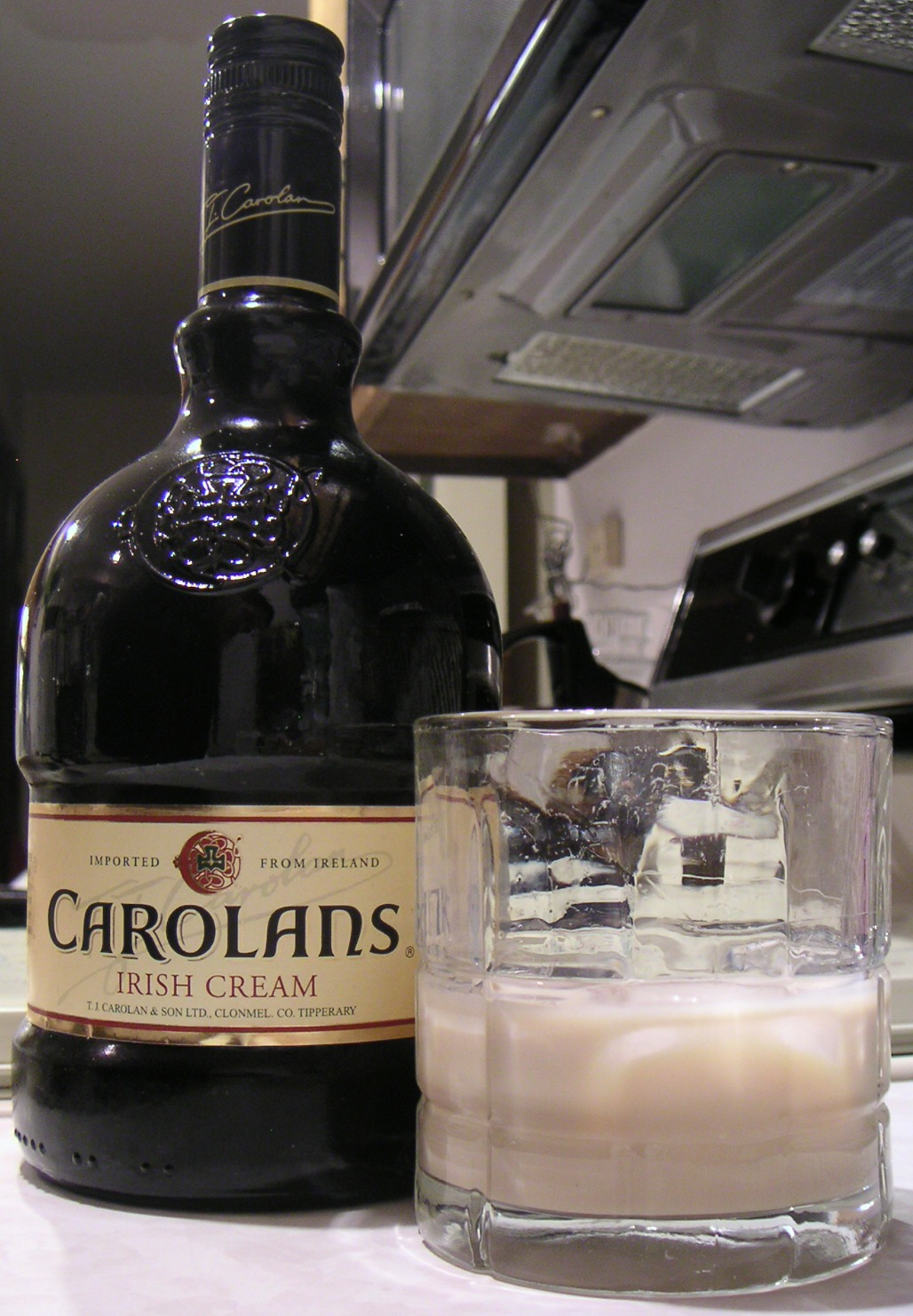
Carolans Irish Cream

Carolans Irish Cream is a liqueur made from a mixture of cream, Irish spirits, Irish whiskey and honey. It has a declared alcohol content of 17%, or 14.5% alcohol by volume. The liqueur is made by First Ireland Spirits in Abbeyleix, Co. Laois, in the Republic of Ireland.

In the 2016 US market, Carolans ranked third in the cream liqueur category behind Baileys Irish Cream and RumChata, and in 2017 it was in second place.

The Irish cream brand is owned by Heaven Hill of Bardstown, Kentucky, whose master distiller and distillery manager Conor O'Driscoll is originally from Dublin, Ireland.

== History ==
Carolans was developed in 1978 and first sold in the UK in July 1979. Heaven Hill purchased Carolans in 2017 for $165 million from Gruppo Campari which held the brand for seven years. The brand was previously owned by William Grant and C&C Group.

== Description ==
_{Commonly used description:}

"Deep milky brown hue. Forward, spirity, whiskey-accented lactic flavors. A rich, milky attack leads to a moderately full-bodied palate with a touch of sweetness."
