= Springbokkie =

Type of cocktail

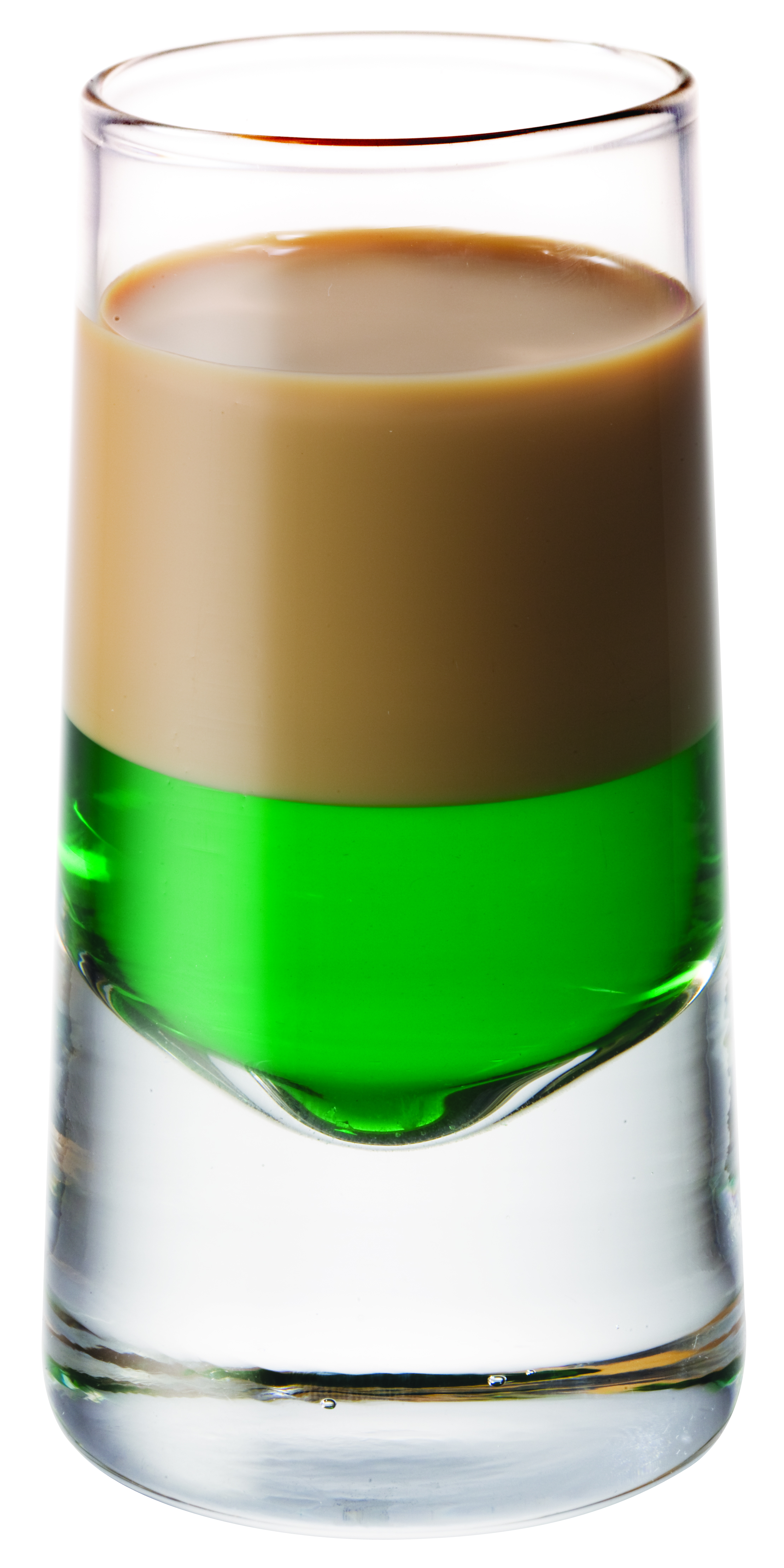
- Type: Layered shooter
- Ingredients: 1cl (1 part) Amarula; 3cl (3 parts) Crème de menthe
- Base spirit: Crème de menthe, Amarula
- Standard drinkware: Shot glass
- Served: Neat: undiluted and without ice
- Preparation: The crème de menthe is poured into the shot glass and the Amarula is carefully layered on top.

The springbokkie ("little springbok" in the Afrikaans language) is a cocktail shooter that is popular in South Africa. It is composed of crème de menthe (mint liqueur) and Amarula (marula fruit cream liqueur). The drink derives its name from the South Africa national rugby union team, known as "The Springboks" after the country’s national animal, who traditionally wear green and gold—the same colours as the cocktail. The ratio of Amarula to crème de menthe varies substantially between recipes.
