= Irish cream =

Cream liqueur

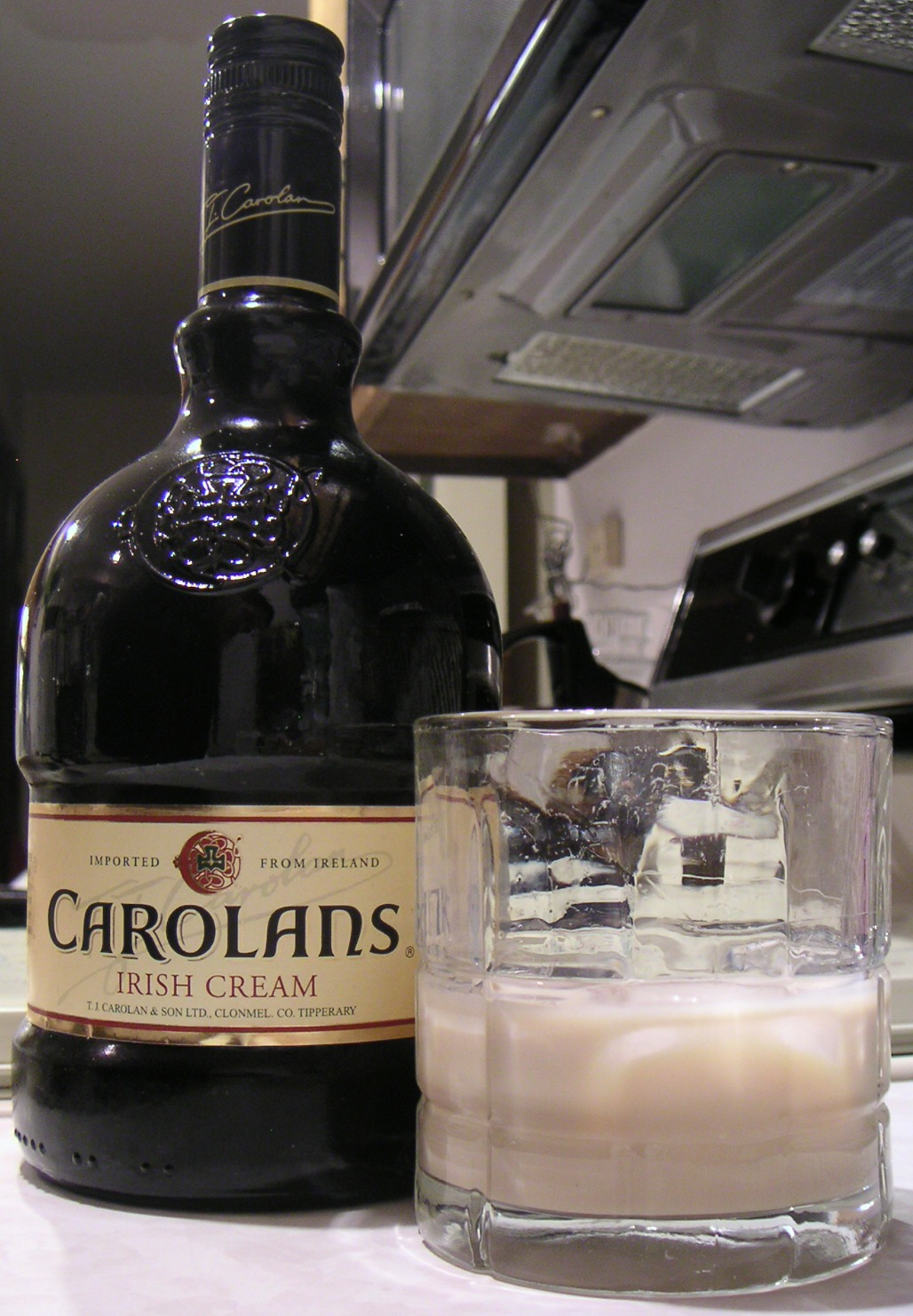
- Carolans brand
- Type: Cream liqueur
- Origin: Ireland
- Introduced: 1973
- Alcohol by volume: 15–20%
- Proof (US): 30°–40°
- Colour: Light brown
- Flavour: Sweet & creamy
- Ingredients: Irish whiskey, grain spirit, cream, sugar, caramel, emulsifier, stabiliser
- Variants: Grain spirit is used in various quantities depending on the brand
- Related products: Irish coffee

Irish cream (Irish: uachtar na hÉireann, uachtar Éireannach) is a cream liqueur based on Irish whiskey, cream and other flavourings. It typically has an alcohol by volume (ABV) level of 15 to 20% and is served on its own or in mixed drinks, most commonly mixed with coffee or in shots such as the B-52 or the Baby Guinness. Its largest markets are the United Kingdom, Canada and the United States.

== Etymology ==
Despite its name, it is not a traditional Irish product, as the first version of it, Baileys, was invented in 1973 by a team headed by British businessman Tom Jago in London, in response to a marketing brief from Gilbeys of Ireland (a division of International Distillers & Vintners). Nevertheless, within the European Union, Irish cream is a protected geographical indication product that must be produced in Ireland.

== Brands ==
Top brands of Irish cream include Baileys, Kerrygold, Carolans and Saint Brendan's.

== Country cream ==
When wine is used as the alcoholic base instead of whiskey, the product is generally known as "Country Cream" rather than Irish cream, and is a wine cocktail rather than a liqueur. These products taste similar, but Country Cream usually has a lower alcohol content and costs less, as wine is generally cheaper to purchase as an ingredient than whiskey. The difference in the origin of the alcohol can also create legal differences in some jurisdictions. Australia's wine equalisation tax makes taxing alcohol content derived from grapes, apple and pear cheaper than taxing an equivalent alcohol content from whiskey in Irish cream.

== Use ==
Irish cream is served straight, on the rocks or in mixed drinks, often layered in a shot glass with Kahlúa and Grand Marnier to make a B-52 (cocktail) shot, a Baby Guinness, or mixed with coffee or hot chocolate. It is also a common addition to White Russians. Some use Irish cream to flavour desserts and other sweet treats.

== See also ==
- Irish coffee, a more traditional Irish whiskey cocktail of similar principle
- Eggnog – Creamy dairy-based beverage
- Cola de mono – Chilean cocktail
