= Malibu (rum) =

Coconut flavored liqueur

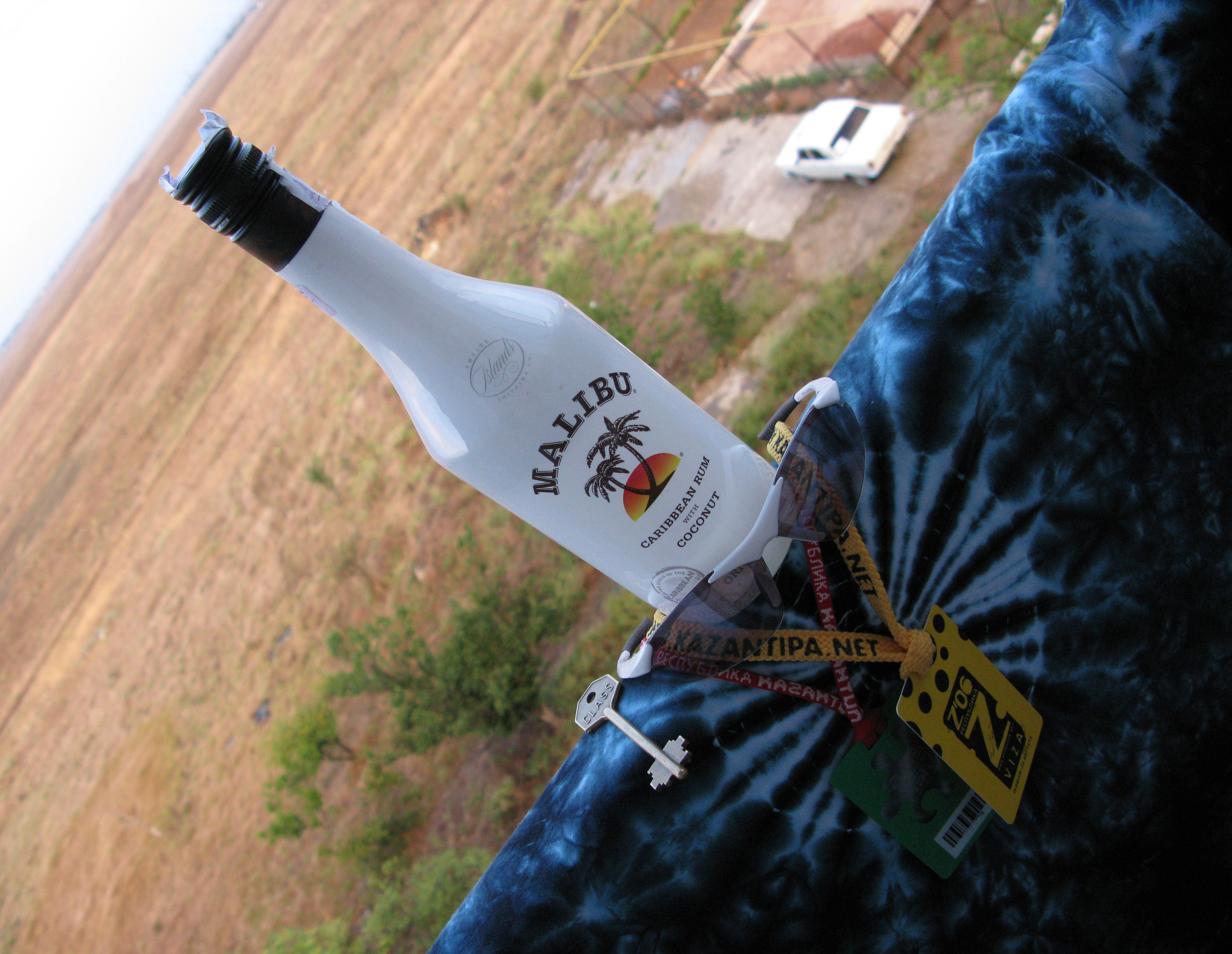
- Type: Liqueur
- Manufacturer: Pernod Ricard
- Origin: Barbados
- Introduced: 1978
- Alcohol by volume: 21% Actually 18%
- Website: malibudrinks.com

Malibu (/məˈliːbuː/) is a coconut flavoured liqueur made with white rum, which has an alcohol content by volume of 21.0% (42 proof). Since 2005 the Malibu brand has been owned by Pernod Ricard, which calls it a "flavored rum", where this designation is allowed by local laws.

== History ==
The product was created in 1978 by Tom Jago of International Distillers & Vintners, and originally made from fruit spirits, flavoured with rum and coconut flavouring in Curaçao. Originally, the product was used to simplify the making of piña coladas by bartenders. When the product took off, the production was then moved to Barbados, where the rum is made by West Indies Rum Distillery Ltd., and the quality of the ingredients used was improved.

The brand was sold by Diageo to Allied Domecq for £560 million in 2002. In 2005, French company Pernod Ricard purchased Allied Domecq for $14 billion. The deal meant that Pernod Ricard acquired a number of alcoholic beverage brands including Malibu rum. Malibu was then integrated into The Absolut Company range of brands in 2005.

== Marketing ==
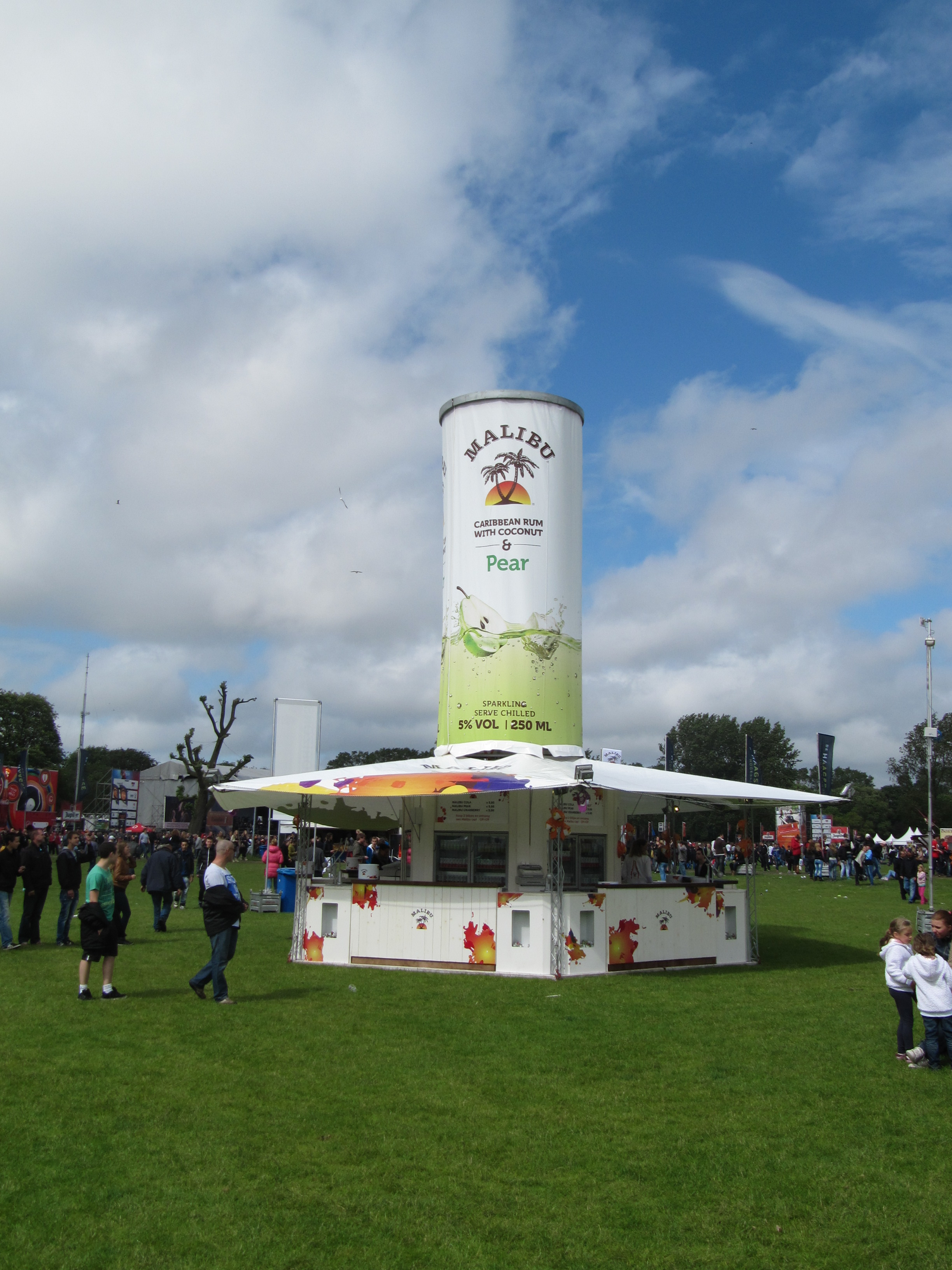
Malibu promotion Parkpop

Past advertising campaigns labelled it "seriously easy going" and usually features people from the Caribbean taking life seriously. This Caribbean focus of Malibu's advertising stands in contrast to the town after which it is named being in the US rather than the Caribbean region.

Since 2014, the advertising campaign has shifted toward the idea of Malibu encouraging people to have their "best summer ever" with a YouTube campaign and TV ads showing the difference between "summer you vs. rest of the year you". In 2016 Malibu started an internet campaign with a commerce website and via the hashtag #Malibu.

In 2022, Malibu launched global brand positioning with "Do Whatever Tastes Good".

In August 2024, Malibu partnered with the Royal Life Saving Society UK (RLSS UK) and British Olympian Tom Daley as part of their "Drink Don't Dive" campaign, with Daley creating and modelling a range of knitted swim briefs, sunglasses, a bucket hat and sliders to raise funds for RLSS UK, and raise awareness of the dangers of swimming after drinking. Malibu and RLSS UK repeated their partnership with Daley at Christmas 2024, with Daley designing a knitted Christmas jumper reading "Drink Don't Drive" to raise awareness of the dangers of drunk driving.

== Variations ==
The original version of Malibu rum is flavoured with coconut. There are many different versions of Malibu rum in the worldwide market, flavoured with various tropical fruits such as banana, pineapple, passion fruit, island melon and mango. Additionally, there is a blend with mint, known as Malibu Fresh, a version mixed with tequila known as Malibu Red, and a double-strength version known as Malibu Black, which is a 35% alcohol by volume (ABV) rum-based liqueur that combines dark rum and the original coconut-flavoured liqueur.

== See also ==
- Piña colada
