= Ornua =

Irish agri-food co-operative

Ornua Co-operative Limited
- Formerly: The Irish Dairy Board (1961–2015)
- Type: Statutory agricultural cooperative
- Industry: Food retail
- Predecessor: Butter Marketing Committee
- Founded: 1961; 65 years ago
- Founder: Government of Ireland
- Headquarters: Grattan House, Mount Street, Dublin, Ireland
- Area served: Worldwide
- Revenue: €3.5 billion (2025)
- Operating income: €136.6 million (2025)
- Owners: Tirlán; Dairygold Co-operative Society Limited; Lakeland Dairies Co-operative Limited; Arrabawn Co-operative Society Limited; Aurivo Co-operative Society Limited; North Cork Co-operative Creameries Limited; Tipperary Co-operative Creamery Limited; Carbery Creameries Limited
- Website: ornua.com

Ornua is an Irish agricultural cooperative that markets and sells dairy products on behalf of its members, Irish dairy processors and farmers. The name comes from the Irish Ór Nua, meaning "new gold". From 1961 until 2015 it was known as The Irish Dairy Board (Irish: Bord Bainne). The co-operative owns the Kerrygold butter and cheese brand and Kerrygold Irish Cream Liqueur. Its other brands include Pilgrims Choice, Dubliner, Shannongold and BEO milk powder.

== History ==
=== Establishment (1961) ===
The Irish Dairy Board was set up under the Dairy Produce Marketing Act 1961 and replaced the earlier Butter Marketing Committee. Its purpose was to centralise the overseas marketing of Irish dairy products, to achieve economies of scale and greater brand recognition. The Board was founded for an industry of small and medium-sized co-operatives that could not mount large international campaigns on their own.

At the time, the European Economic Community market was closed to Irish butter, and the United Kingdom limited Irish imports with an import quota.

=== Kerrygold (1962) ===
Tony O'Reilly was appointed general manager in 1962. In July of that year he proposed to the board a new consumer brand to grow butter exports. The name was chosen from about sixty suggestions. The six shortlisted names were Buttercup, Shannon Gold, Leprechaun, Tub-o-Gold, Golden Farm and Kerrygold. The name was intended to evoke "farming, naturalness, goodness and above all quality milk" and a sense of Irishness.

In October 1962 the brand was test-launched in the Winterhill area of North West England.

=== Expansion (1973 onward) ===
When Ireland joined the European Economic Community in 1973, the Board began expanding into continental Europe, starting with North Rhine-Westphalia in Germany. Kerrygold has been the leading butter brand in Germany since then.

In 2014 the Board took over the Spanish cheese manufacturer Luxtor, previously a subsidiary of the Telepizza catering chain.

=== Rename (2015) ===
On 31 March 2015 the Board adopted the name Ornua, "The Home of Irish Dairy".

== Operations ==
As of 2015 Ornua had 19 subsidiaries worldwide, with pre-packing and blending facilities in Germany, Great Britain, the United States and the Middle East. A €36 million Kerrygold butter production and packing plant, Kerrygold Park, was built in Mitchelstown, County Cork.

In 2020 Ornua announced a £3 million investment in its Leek cheese plant to meet demand for its cheese products, bringing total annual production to more than 110,000 tonnes.

== Financial performance ==
Ornua's turnover was about €3.4 billion in 2022. In 2024 Ornua reported an EBITDA of €165.5 million, up 10.4%, and an operating profit of €130.5 million, up 11.8%. For 2025, turnover was just under €3.5 billion, up 1.6%, and operating profit was €136.6 million, up 4.7%, before members' bonuses. The co-operative's CEO, Conor Galvin, described 2025 as "solid" in a "complex" and "turbulent" year, with dairy markets falling in late summer and uncertainty over US tariffs.

Kerrygold was the second-highest-selling butter in the United States and the highest-selling butter in Ireland as of 2019, and it grew by double digits almost every year from 2009 to 2019.

== Awards ==
In 2010 the Irish Dairy Board was named Exporter of the Year by the Irish Exporters Association.

== See also ==
- 1986–1988 radioactive milk distribution in Mexico
