= Pilgrims Choice =

Cheese brand

- Industry: Cheese
- Founded: 1985; 41 years ago
- Founder: David Hardisty
- Headquarters: Leek, Staffordshire, England
- Products: Farmhouse Vintage Extra Mature
- Owner: Ornua
- Website: pilgrimschoice.com

Pilgrims Choice is a cheese brand owned by Irish dairy exporter Ornua (formerly Adams Foods Ltd and the North Downs Dairy), with UK operations based in Leek, Staffordshire.

Despite an Identification Code of UK LK002, Pilgrims Choice is substantially sourced from Irish-produced cheese. The company packs include Mature Cheddar, Mature Lighter and Extra Mature Cheddar.

== History ==
Pilgrims Choice was founded by David Hardisty, the founder of North Downs Dairy, in 1985, and was bought by the Irish Dairy Board in 1997.

The brand Pilgrims Choice was launched onto the retail market in 1999 as a pre-packaged cheese in its trademark black packaging. Pilgrims Choice Farmhouse Vintage Extra Mature then became Britain's fastest growing Protected Designated Origin West Country farmhouse cheddar brand, with sales of more than £20 million by the year 2000.

In 2014, Pilgrims Choice partnered with the television show Britain's Got Talent to launch the ‘Make The Pilgrims Choice’ campaign. The campaign gave viewers the chance to vote for contestants that did not get through the first round of auditions by visiting the company's website and casting their vote.

In September 2020, it was announced that Ornua would revamp Pilgrims Choice cheese blocks with a plastic-saving eco-friendly pack format.

In July 2022, Pilgrims Choice launched a 10-second TV advertising campaign targeting gastronomes on Food Network, as well as Discovery+ and YouTube.

In October 2022, it was announced that Simon Ball was appointed by Ornua as the managing director of Ornua Foods.

== Reception ==
In 2019, Pilgrims Choice was ranked the UK's 4th top cheese brand by The Grocer. In 2020, Ornua reported sales of Pilgrims Choice had grown by 25% in the past 52 weeks, outperforming the general category by 10%.

In 2022, Pilgrims Choice was ranked the UK’s 2nd top cheddar and Kerrygold and 3rd block butter.
