= RumChata =

American cream liqueur

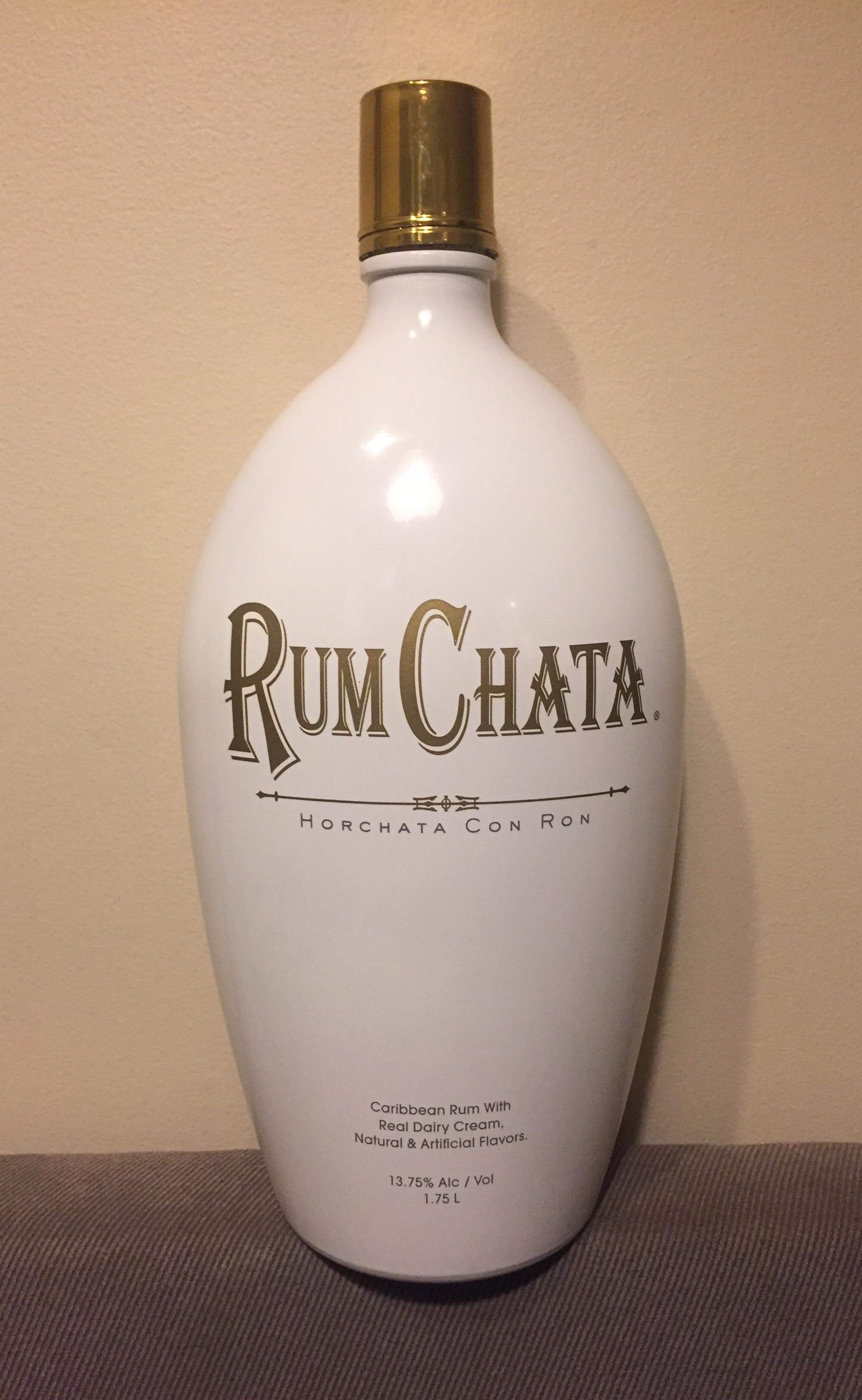
- 1.75 liter bottle of Rumchata
- Type: Liqueur
- Manufacturer: Midwest Custom Bottling Company
- Distributor: Agave Loco LLC
- Origin: Pewaukee, Wisconsin, United States
- Introduced: 2009
- Alcohol by volume: 13.75 to 15%
- Flavor: Horchata and Rum
- Website: rumchata.com

RumChata is a cream liqueur manufactured in Wisconsin. Its name is a portmanteau of rum and horchata; the liqueur was designed to taste like a mixture of the two.

It contains 13.75% or 15% alcohol by volume, depending on where it is sold.

== Recipe ==
The recipe includes rum, dairy cream, cinnamon, vanilla, sugar, and other flavorings. The drink has been manufactured in Pewaukee, Wisconsin, since 2009.

== Market position ==
In the 2016 US market, RumChata ranked second in the cream liqueur category after Baileys Irish Cream.

== History ==
RumChata is a cream liqueur produced in Pewaukee, Wisconsin, launched in 2009. It was created by Tom Maas, a distillery industry veteran. The company was acquired by E&J Gallo Winery in 2021.

== See also ==
- Horchata
- Rum
