= Amarula =

Cream liqueur originating from South Africa

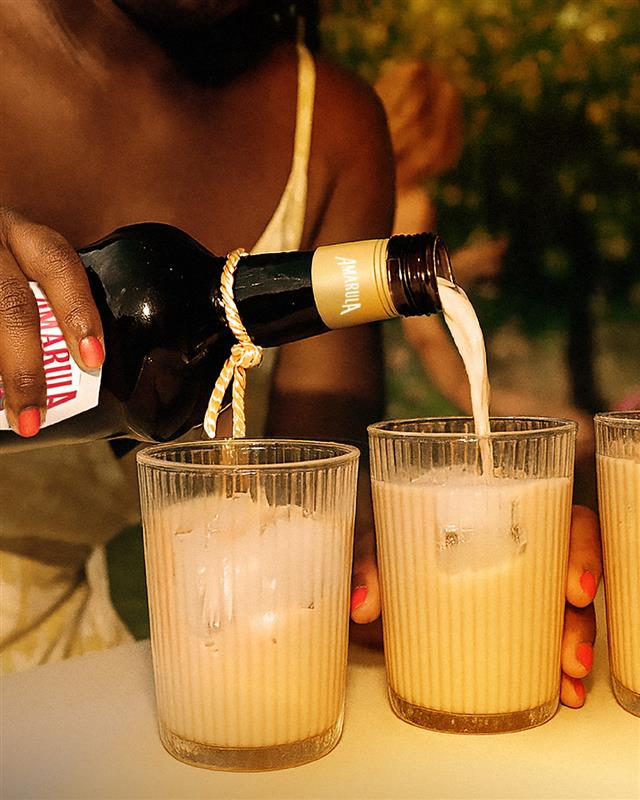
- Amarula cream liqueur being poured into glasses
- Type: Cream liqueur
- Manufacturer: Southern Liqueur Company
- Origin: South Africa
- Introduced: September 1989
- Alcohol by volume: 17%
- Flavour: Marula
- Ingredients: Sugar, cream and the fruit of the African marula tree
- Related products: Springbokkie
- Website: www.amarula.com

Amarula is a cream liqueur from South Africa. It is made with sugar, cream and the fruit of the African marula tree (Sclerocarya birrea) which is also locally called the elephant tree or marriage tree. It has an alcohol content of 17% by volume (34 proof). It has had some success at international spirit ratings competitions, winning a gold medal at the 2009 San Francisco World Spirits Competition. It has the taste of slightly fruity caramel.

== History ==
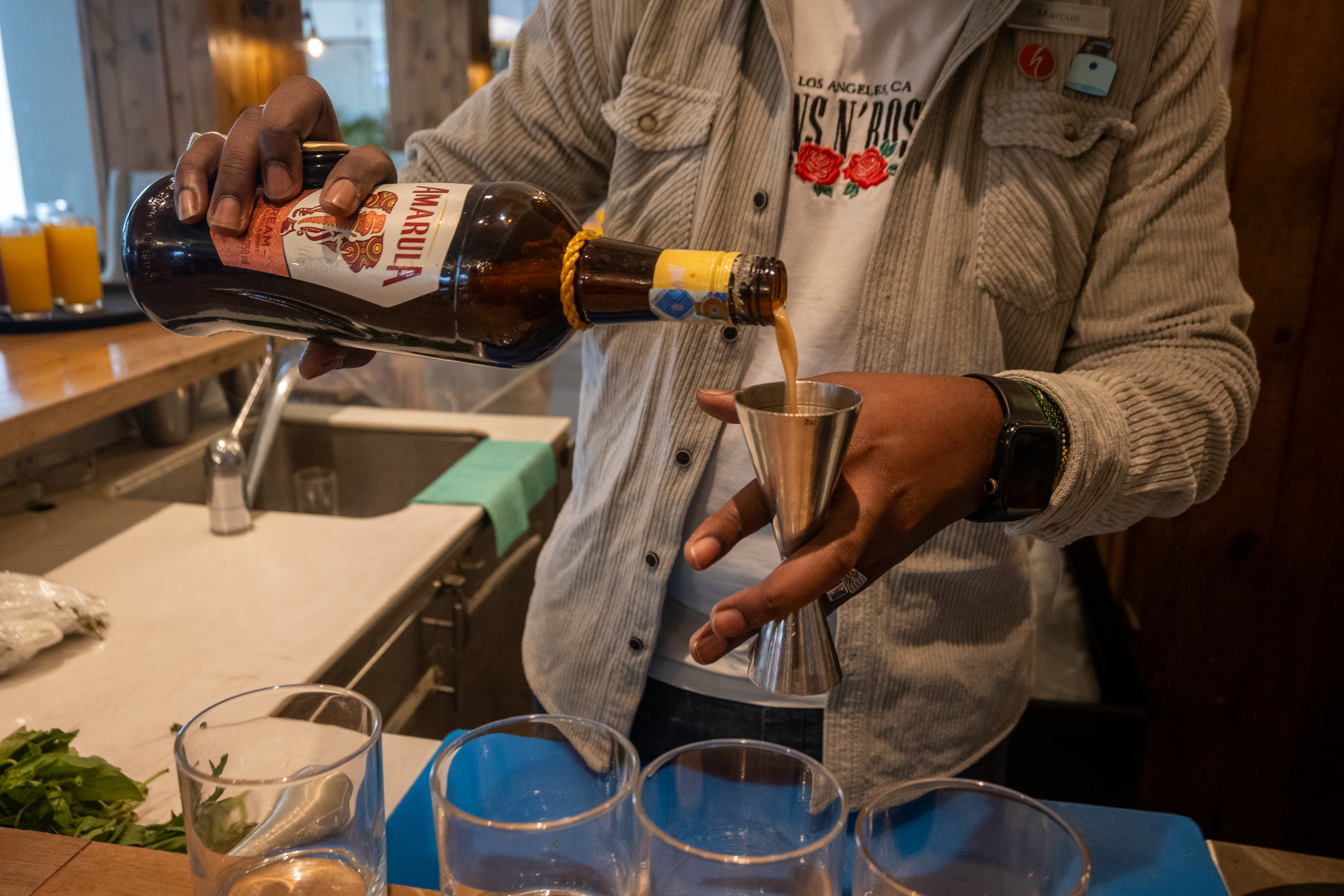
A bartender serves Amarula. Nairobi, Kenya.

Amarula was first marketed by Southern Liqueur Company of South Africa (the current trademark owners and wholly owned subsidiary of Distell Group Limited) as a liqueur in September 1989, the Amarula spirit having been launched in 1983.

In 2023, Distell was acquired by Heineken Beverages, and with that the Amarula brand.

== Flavors ==
- Amarula Cream Liqueur 17% ABV
- Amarula Ethiopian Coffee Cream Liqueur 15.5% ABV
- Raspberry, Chocolate & African Baobab Cream Liqueur 15.5% ABV (launched in 2019)
- Amarula Vanilla Spice Cream Liqueur 15.5% ABV
- Amarula Vegan Liqueur 15.5% ABV
- Khanyisa Limited Edition 15.5% ABV - Proceeds go towards rehabilitating Khanyisa, an orphaned albino baby elephant injured in a poacher's snare.

== Elephant-associated marketing ==
African bush elephants enjoy eating the fruit of the marula tree. Because of the marula tree's association with elephants, the distiller has made them its symbol and supports elephant conservation efforts, co-funding the Amarula Elephant Research Programme at the University of Natal, Durban. For marketing efforts, it produces elephant-themed collectible items.

The brand supports elephant research to protect elephants and conserve the population. In 2002, the Amarula Elephant Research Program (AERP) was launched under the direction of Rob Slotow, a professor at the University of KwaZulu-Natal in Durban, South Africa. This primarily researches the way of life, the range of movement and the behavior of the African elephant with the aim of protecting the habitat of the elephants and securing their future in the wild.

In 2025, the brand made an urban art project called "Elephant Heart" to support Elephant Sanctuary Brazil. A sculpture made out of disco ball circled several places of São Paulo until reaching Beco do Batman, where it would stay at ZIV Galery.

== Awards ==
- Amarula Raspberry, Chocolate & African Baobab Cream Liqueur (Master - Liqueur Masters 2022)
- Amarula Cream Liqueur (2022 Best South African Cream - World Liqueur Awards)

== Distribution ==
Outside of South Africa, Amarula has had particular success in Brazil. Introduced in the country in the 90s, Amarula is the most popular creamy liqueur in Brazil, having 15% of the market share and consumption growing 44% between 2019 and 2024. Brazil is 8% of the global volume of Amarula.

In 2019, Amarula and brazilian company Rei do Mate made a co-branding recipe of Amarula Cappuccino.

== See also ==
- Springbokkie
