= Cream liqueur =

Liqueur containing cream

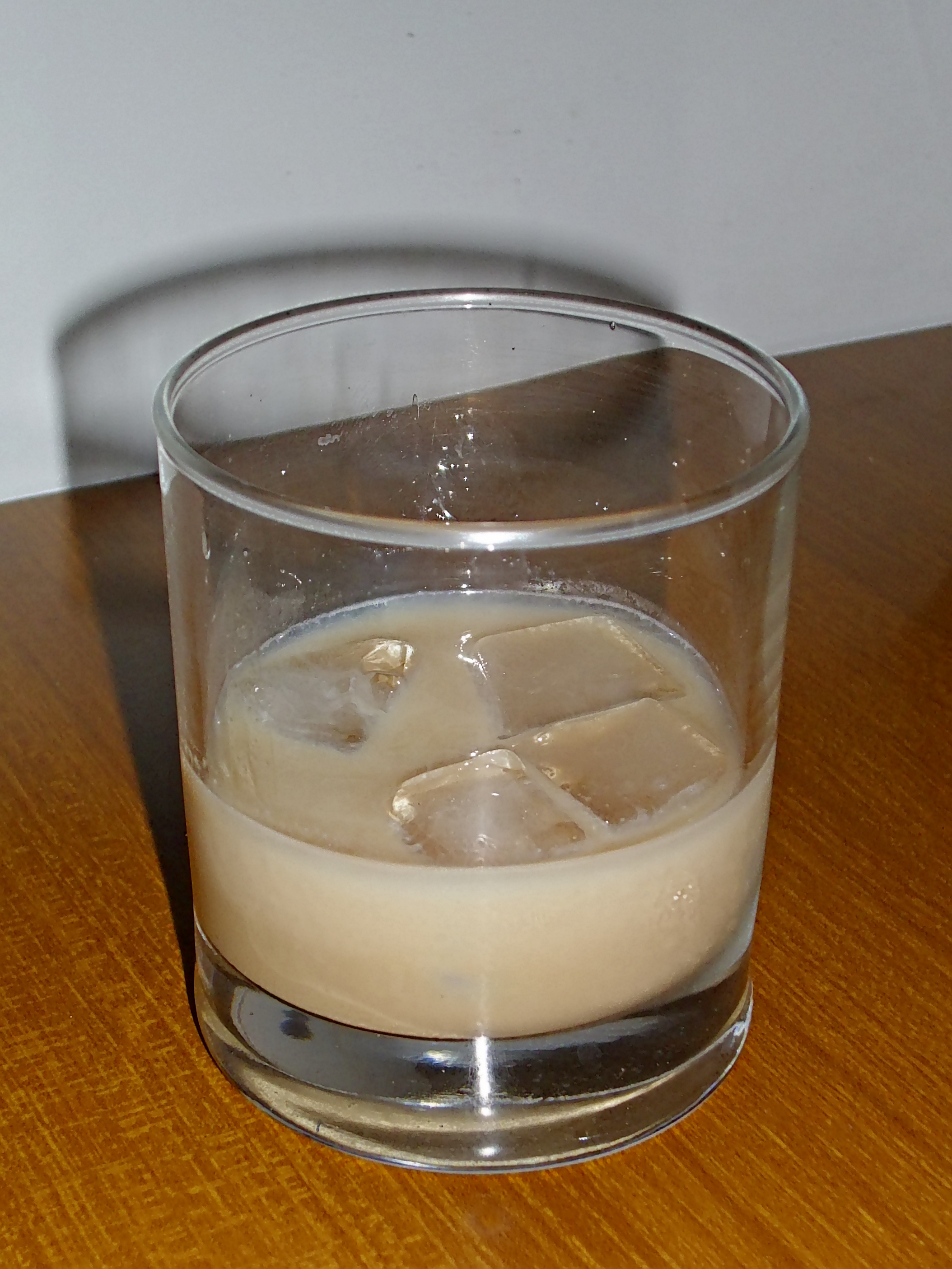
Baileys Irish Cream, a cream liqueur

A cream liqueur is a liqueur that includes dairy cream and a generally flavourful liquor among its ingredients.

Notable cream liqueurs include:

- Amarula, which uses distillate of fermented South African marula fruits

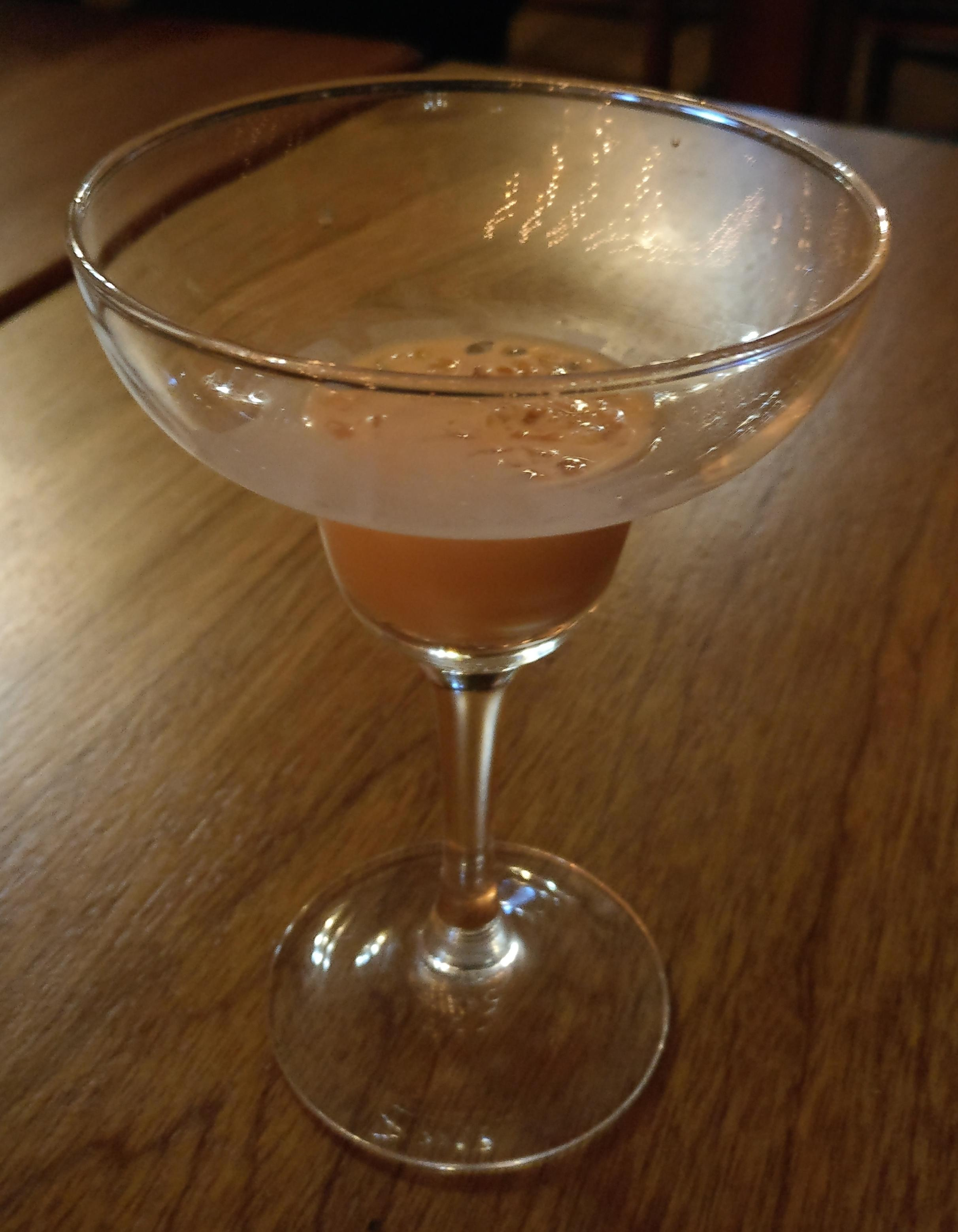
Amarula, the South African liqueur

- Irish cream, which uses Irish whiskey

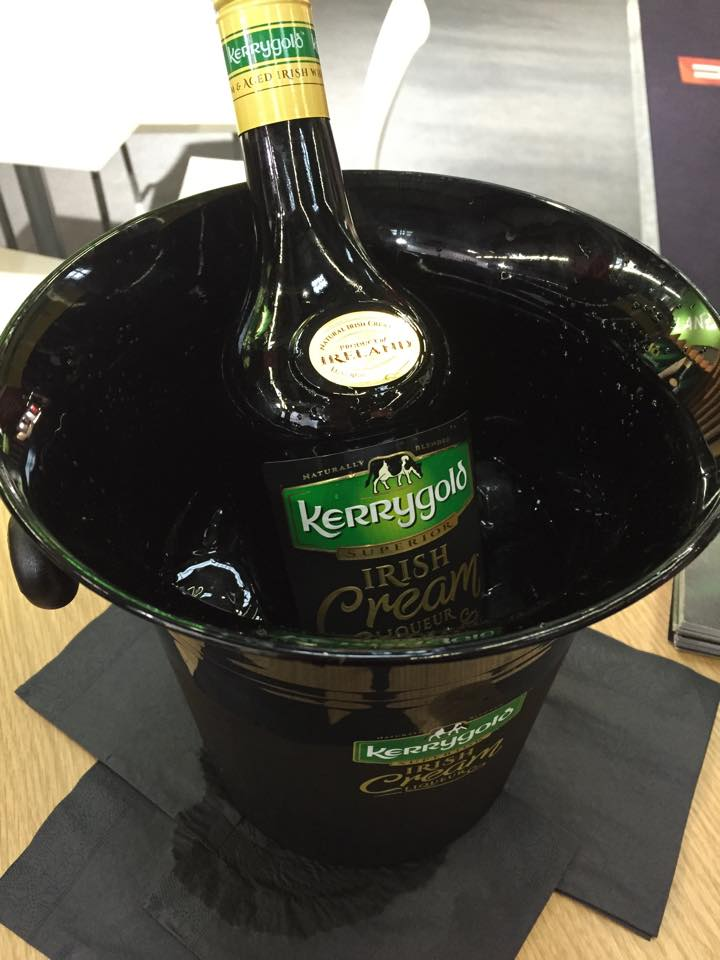
Kerrygold Irish cream

- Cruzan Rum, with rum and other ingredients
- Dooley's, which uses toffee and vodka
- Heather Cream, uses Scotch whisky
- Voodoo Cream Liqueur, an Indian cream liqueur with whisky
- RumChata, a mixture of rum and horchata
- Rompope, an eggnog-type drink made with eggs, milk, vanilla flavouring, and rum.
- Cream Mezcal, in some regions of southern Mexico, the distilled alcoholic beverage made from any agave is mixed with cream and flavoring of fruits and nuts.

== How to consume cream liqueur ==
Cream liqueur can be consumed with or without ice or any mixers. It can be consumed on the rocks or as a cocktail ingredient.

The US cocktail Irish Car Bomb was invented in the 1970s as a way of serving Baileys Irish Cream.

== See also ==
- List of cream liqueurs
- Nightcap (drink)
