= Baby Guinness =

Shooter of coffee liqueur topped with Irish cream

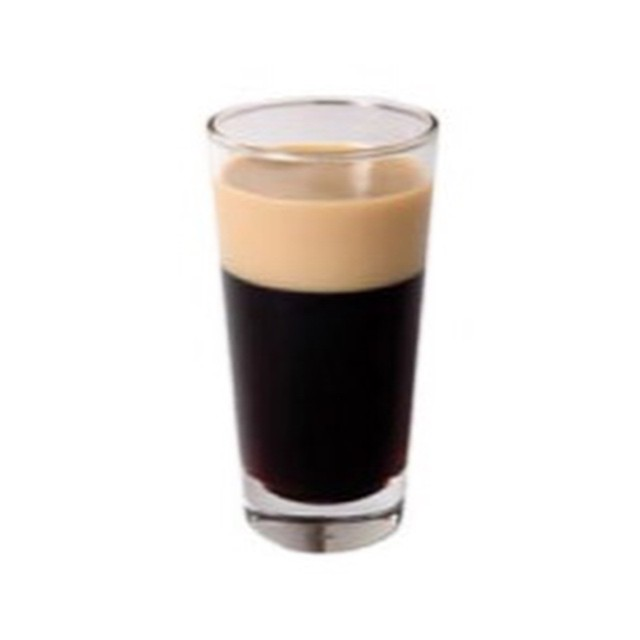
- A shot glass of Baby Guinness
- Type: Mixed drink
- Ingredients: 3/4 shot (3 parts) coffee liqueur, 1/4 shot (1 part) Irish cream
- Standard drinkware: Shot glass
- Preparation: Float Irish cream on top of coffee liqueur

A Baby Guinness is a cocktail containing coffee liqueur and Irish cream, intended to be consumed in one shot. It does not contain Guinness, but is made in such a way as to look like a tiny glass of stout.

== Preparation ==
In a shot glass a portion of coffee liqueur is topped by a layer of Irish cream which is poured over the back of a spoon so that it sits on the coffee liqueur. The ratio of coffee liqueur to Irish cream varies but is generally around 3-to-1. The resulting drink resembles a miniature pint of Guinness stout, with the coffee liqueur serving as the beer and the Irish cream as the head.

Some recipes call for the Irish cream to be whipped then spooned on top of the coffee liqueur in order to look more like the head on a pint of Guinness. Over time, the Baby Guinness became a widely recognized drink in Irish pubs and beyond.

=== Variations ===
In some places, a Baby Guinness is served with black Sambuca instead of coffee liqueur creating a drink similar to a slippery nipple.

== See also ==
- List of cocktails
