= Tom Jago =

British liquor executive (1925-2018)

- Born: 21 July 1925; Camelford, Cornwall
- Died: 12 October 2018 (aged 93); London, England
- Education: Christ Church, Oxford
- Occupations: Liquor executive, marketeer
- Known for: Creator of Baileys Irish Cream, Malibu and Johnnie Walker Blue Label
- Spouse: Penelope Vaughan-Morgan (m. 1952; died 2018)
- Children: 4
- Military career
- Allegiance: United Kingdom
- Branch: Royal Navy
- Service years: 1942–1945
- Rank: Lieutenant
- Conflicts: Second World War

Thomas Edwin Jago(21 July 1925 – 12 October 2018) was a British liquor executive and marketeer known as the creator of Baileys Irish Cream and Malibu (flavoured rum).

During his semi-retirement, he co-founded The Last Drop Distillers with other industry veterans and his daughter in 2008 that specialises in rare and unique spirits.

== Biography ==
Jago was born on 21 July 1925 in Camelford, Cornwall, the son of Thomas Bennett Jago, who managed the local Barclays bank, and his mother Violet. He went to Camelford Grammar School before studying history at Christ Church, Oxford. Jago served as a lieutenant on the destroyer HMS Wolfhound in the North Atlantic during World War II. After the war he returned to Oxford and completed his degree.

In 1952, Jago married Penelope Vaughan-Morgan (1926–2018), a granddaughter of Kenyon Vaughan-Morgan, and niece of John Vaughan-Morgan, Baron Reigate.
