= North Cork Creameries =

Regional Irish creamery co-operative society

North Cork Co-operative Creameries Limited
- Company type: Cooperative
- Industry: Dairy
- Founded: 1928; 98 years ago
- Headquarters: Kanturk, Ireland
- Number of employees: 100
- Website: https://www.northcorkcreameries.com/

North Cork Co-operative Creameries, better known as North Cork Creameries, is an Irish agricultural cooperative and creamery headquartered in Kanturk, County Cork. The co-op is a supplier of cream to Kerrygold and a member/shareholder of Ornua, Kerrygold's manufacturer. It is also a member of Bord Bia’s Origin Green.

As of March 2026, the creamery employed approximately 100 people.

== History ==
North Cork Creameries was founded in 1928.

In 2018, North Cork merged with its counterpart in Abbeyfeale, Limerick, the Feale Bridge & Headley Bridge co-op. As a result of the merger, North Cork Creameries processed over 250 million litres of milk, including the additional 12.5 million litres processed by Feale Bridge & Headley Bridge. It now processes over 315 million liters.

Also that year, North Cork merged with the Newtownsandes Co-operative in Moyvane, Co. Kerry. Between 2017 to 2019, North Cork Creameries won the overall national Gold Q Award at the Irish Quality Food Awards for its butter three years in a row.

In 2021, North Cork partnered with Teagasc, creating a programme to improve farm profitability. In March 2025, they appointed Stephen Daly as CEO, succeeding Michael Cronin.

=== Environmental disputes ===
In July 2012, Inland Fisheries Ireland took North Cork Creameries to court for discharging milk into the River Allow. Following the court's conviction, the creamery paid a €3,500 fine. In 2015, officials from Cork City Council found a broken pipe—which they said "appeared to be broken for some time"—was spewing "serious unauthorised discharge". In April 2018, the Council brought North Cork Creameries to Mallow District Court for water pollution. The creamery pleaded guilty and the judge applied the Probation Act. Furthermore, the judge ordered North Cork Creameries to pay the local angling club €5,000.

In September 2019, Inland Fisheries Ireland again sued the Creamery after a tanker spilled hundreds of liters of skimmed milk into the River Allow. Inspectors found that the fish had fled the polluted zone. The creamery again pled guilty, and the judge gave the Probation Act and ordered the creamery to pay the local angling club €7,500.

In March 2022, the EPA named North Cork Creameries on its National Priority Sites List, a list of the "sites with the poorest compliance record". In November 2024, The EPA promised "targeted enforcement action" against North Cork Creameries after it stayed on the National Priority Sites List for most of 2022 and all of 2023 and 2024.

On 22 February 2024, the Creameries pleaded guilty to eight charges of breaching its Industrial Emissions Licence. They were sentenced on 29 April 2025 at Mallow District Court. In August 2025, EPA inspectors found ammonia 52 times above the legal limit in a discharge pipe into the River Allow. Ammonia is lethal to fish at high concentrations, and this was the highest ammonia level recorded in the EPA's published noncompliance notices.

In 2025, the Environmental Protection Agency (EPA) investigated whether the co-op was responsible for a mass fish kill in the Munster Blackwater. Following this major investigation, the EPA and Inland Fisheries Ireland found that North Cork Creameries was completely and undoubtedly not responsible, in any way, for the fish kill.

In 2025 and 2026, North Cork Creameries' wastewater discharge license was suspended three times, after failure to comply with a notice, following an EPA investigation. That investigation found that the co-op was leaking effluent discharge into the River Allow. Overall, the organisation was investigated by the EPA fifty times in 2025, the most out of any site in Ireland. The EPA refused to allow North Cork Creameries to resume its discharge until the EPA is satisfied that the creamery will satisfy licence requirements on an ongoing basis.

Soon afterwards, North Cork ceased milk processing altogether, and 98 staff members were told they would be made redundant. SIPTU, which represented 80 of the staff members at the plant, was not informed of the decision. They sought an urgent meeting with management who had reportedly not responded as of early March 2026. The creamery planned to send some of its milk for processing to the Carbery Group in west Cork, but—in March—this deal did initially proceed. As of 2 April, however, North Cork Creameries and the Carbery Group reached a new agreement that the latter co-op would process North Cork Creameries' milk.
