= Rei do Mate =

Brazilian fast food chain

- Industry: Restaurants
- Founded: 1978; 48 years ago
- Headquarters: São Paulo, Brazil
- Number of locations: 280
- Area served: Brazil
- Products: Fast food, including: Beverages · Cheese buns · Sandwiches
- Website: www.reidomate.com.br

Rei do Mate (Portuguese pronunciation: [ˈʁej ðu ˈmatʃi]) is a Brazilian fast food chain of tea house stores.

The chain was founded in 1978 by the Syrian entrepreneur Khalil Nasraui, as a small shop next to the São João and Ipiranga avenue, in the city of São Paulo. Currently, 280 stores are spread across 17 states of Brazil, offering more than 100 combinations of mate tea, hot drinks like cappuccinos and also healthy snacks.
