= Liqueur =

Alcoholic beverage

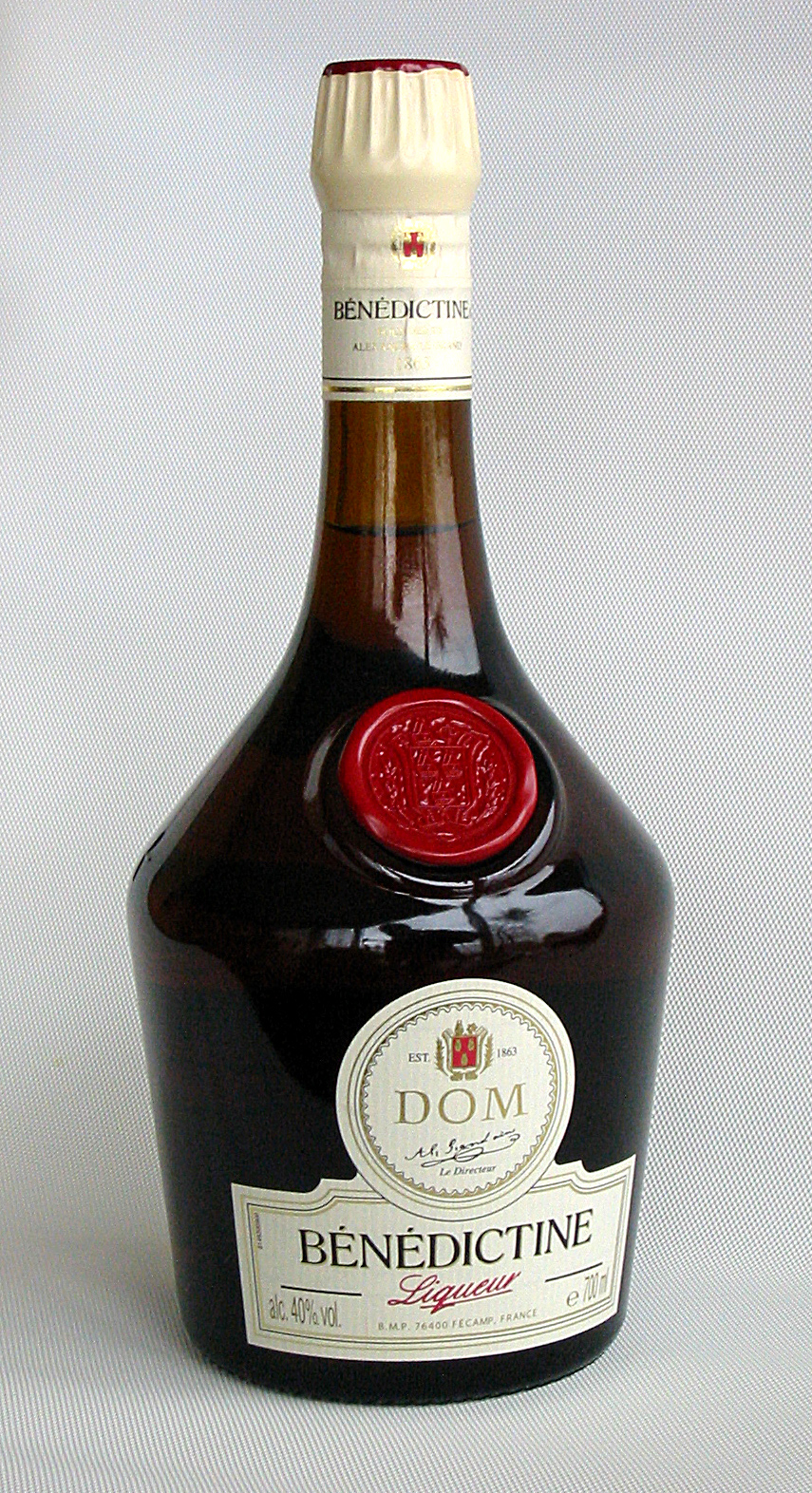
Bénédictine, a traditional French herbal liqueur

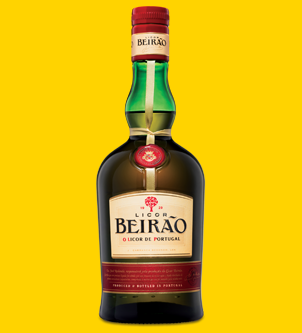
Licor Beirão, a traditional Portuguese spice liqueur

A liqueur (UK: /lɪˈkjʊər/ li-KURE, US: /lɪˈkɜːr/ li-KUR; French: [likœʁ]) or cordial is an alcoholic drink composed of spirits (often rectified spirit) and additional flavorings such as sugar, fruits, herbs, and spices. Often served with or after dessert, they are typically heavily sweetened and un-aged, beyond a resting period during production, when necessary, for their flavors to mingle.

Liqueurs are historical descendants of herbal medicines. They were made in France as early as the 13th century, often prepared by monks (for example, Chartreuse). Today they are produced all over the world, commonly served neat, over ice, with coffee, in cocktails, and used in cooking.

== Etymology ==
The French word liqueur is derived from the Latin liquifacere, which means "to dissolve".

In some parts of the United States and Canada, liqueurs may be referred to as cordials, or schnapps. This can cause confusion as in the United Kingdom a cordial would refer to a non-alcoholic concentrated fruit syrup, typically diluted to taste and consumed as a non-carbonated soft drink. Schnapps, on the other hand, can refer to any distilled beverage in Germany and aquavit in Scandinavian countries.

== Legal definitions ==
=== Canada ===
Under the Food and Drug Regulations (C.R.C., c. 870), liqueurs are produced from mixing alcohol with plant materials. These materials include juices or extracts from fruits, flowers, leaves or other plant materials. The extracts are obtained by soaking, filtering or softening the plant substances. A sweetening agent should be added in an amount that is at least 2.5 percent of the finished liqueur. The alcohol percentage shall be at least 23%. It may also contain natural or artificial flavoring and color.

=== European Union ===
The European Union directive on spirit drinks provides guidelines applicable to all liqueurs. As such, a liqueur must

- contain a minimum of 15% alcohol by volume,
- in most cases, contain sweetening equivalent to at least 100 grams of inverted sugar per liter,
- be created using neutral grain alcohol and/or distillate(s) of agricultural origin,
- be flavored with natural, or nature-identical, flavorings, and
- be labeled with the alcohol content and a list of any food colorings.

=== United Kingdom ===
After the UK formally left The European Union on the 31st January 2020, many existing EU laws rolled over into the UK framework including the legalities around Liqueurs and since have not significantly changed.

=== United States ===
The Alcohol and Tobacco Tax and Trade Bureau regulates liqueurs similarly to Canada. Liqueurs (and also cordials) are defined as products created by mixing or redistilling distilled spirits with fruit, plant products, natural flavors, extracts, or sweeteners. These additives must be added in an amount not less than 2.5% by weight of the final product.

In the United States, where spirits are often called "liquor", there is often confusion discerning between liqueurs and liquors, due to the many different types of flavored spirits that are available today (e.g., flavored vodka). Liqueurs generally contain a lower alcohol content (15–30% ABV) than spirits and have a sweetener mixed, while some can have an ABV as high as 55%.

== Preparation ==
Some liqueurs are prepared by infusing certain woods, fruits, or flowers in either water or alcohol and adding sugar or other items. Others are distilled from aromatic or flavoring agents.

Anise and Rakı liqueurs have the property of turning from transparent to cloudy when added to water: the oil of anise remains in solution in the presence of a high concentration of alcohol, but coalesces when the alcohol concentration is reduced; this is known as the ouzo effect.

== Use ==
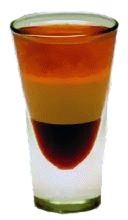
The B-52 is a layered drink prepared using Grand Marnier atop Irish cream over a base of coffee liqueur

=== Cocktails ===
Adding liqueurs to a cocktail can change the flavour and appearance of the cocktail. Whilst some liqueurs are coloured and designed to make the cocktail pop in colour, others are clear to prevent the liqueur from taking over the colour of the base spirit or garnish.

=== Layered drinks ===
Layered drinks are made by floating different-colored liqueurs in separate layers. Each liqueur is poured slowly into a glass over the back of a spoon or down a glass rod, so that the liquids of different densities remain unmixed, creating a striped effect.

== Gallery ==
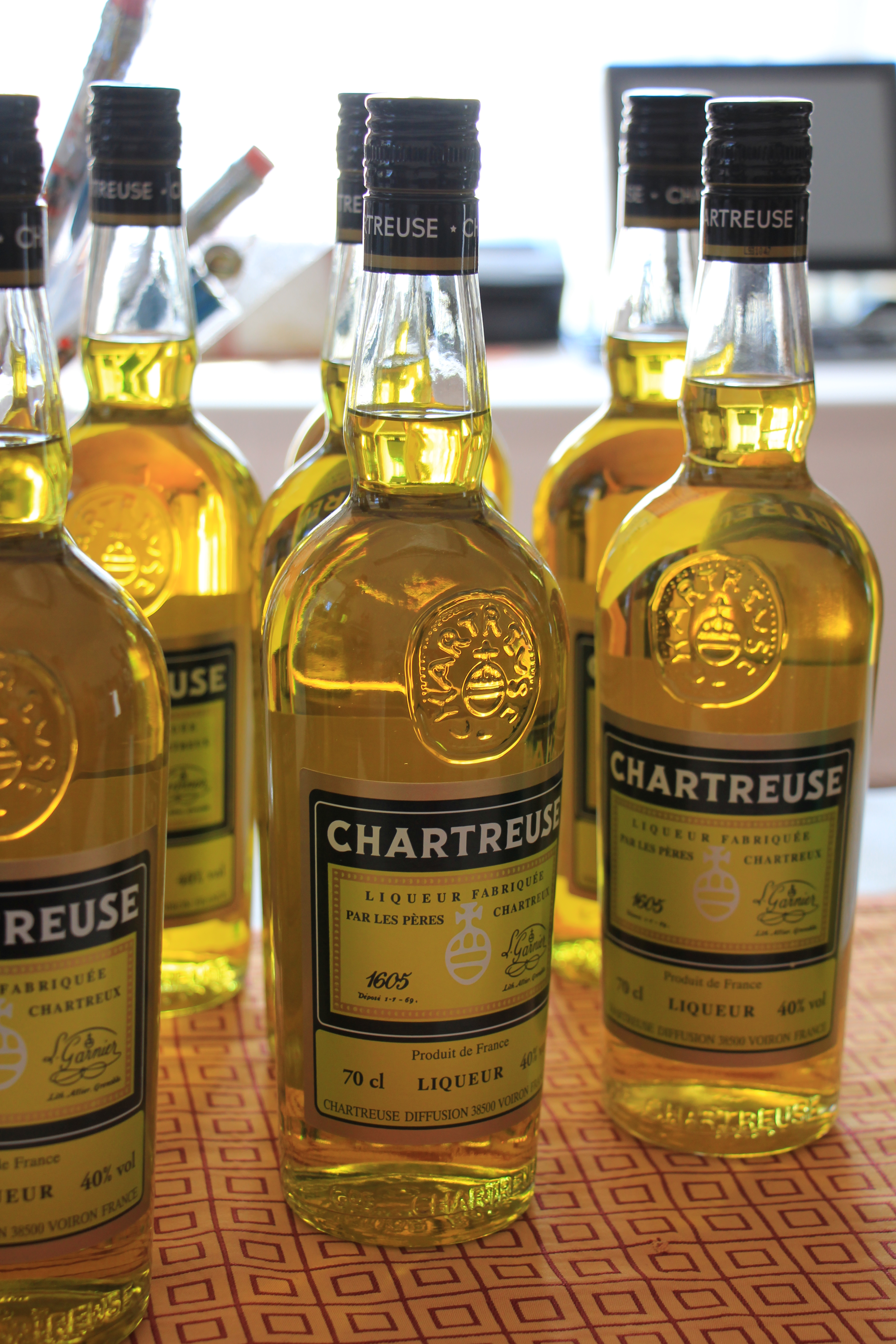
Chartreuse has been made by French Carthusian monks since the 1740s

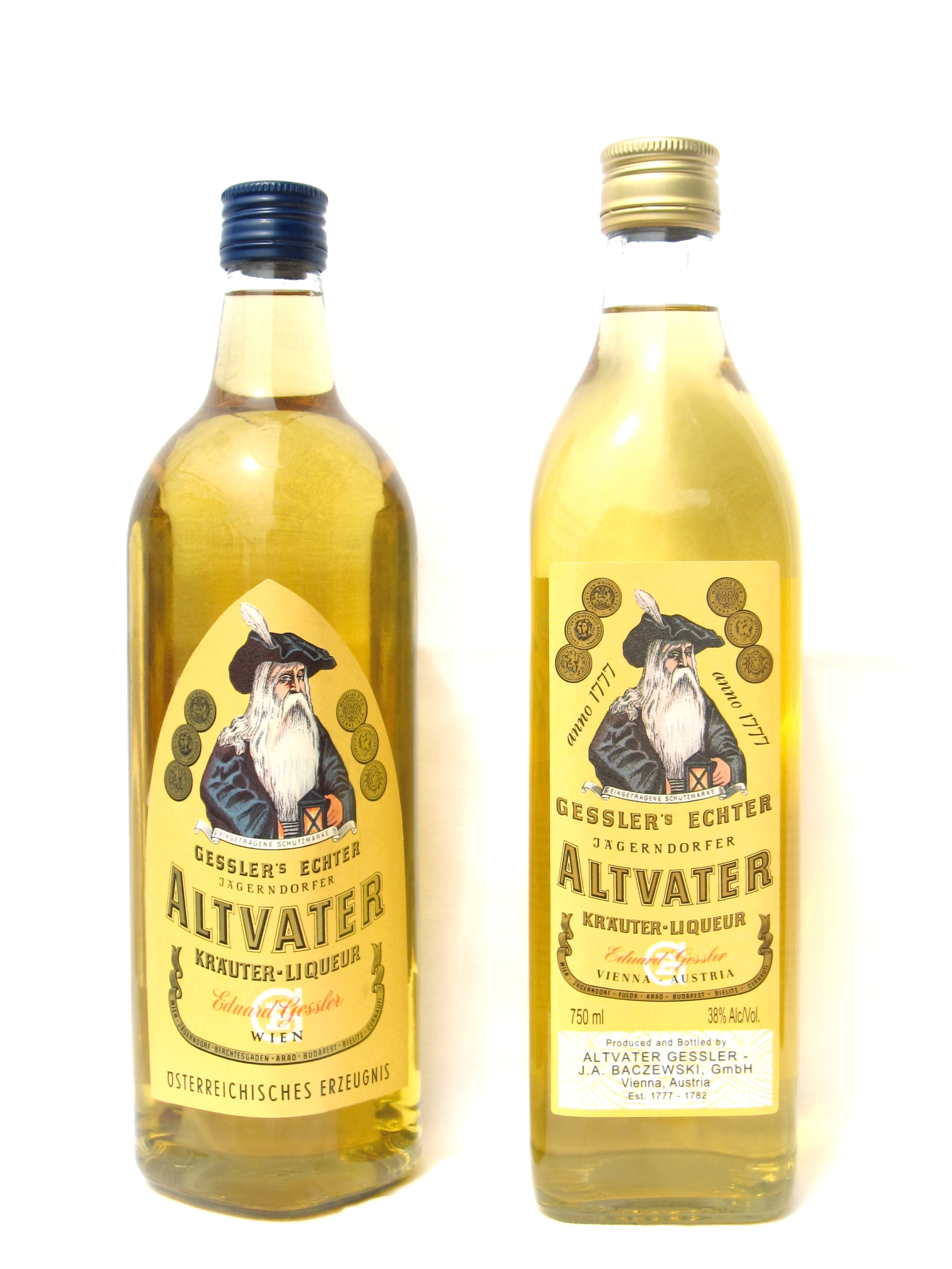
Altvater herbal liqueur produced in Austria

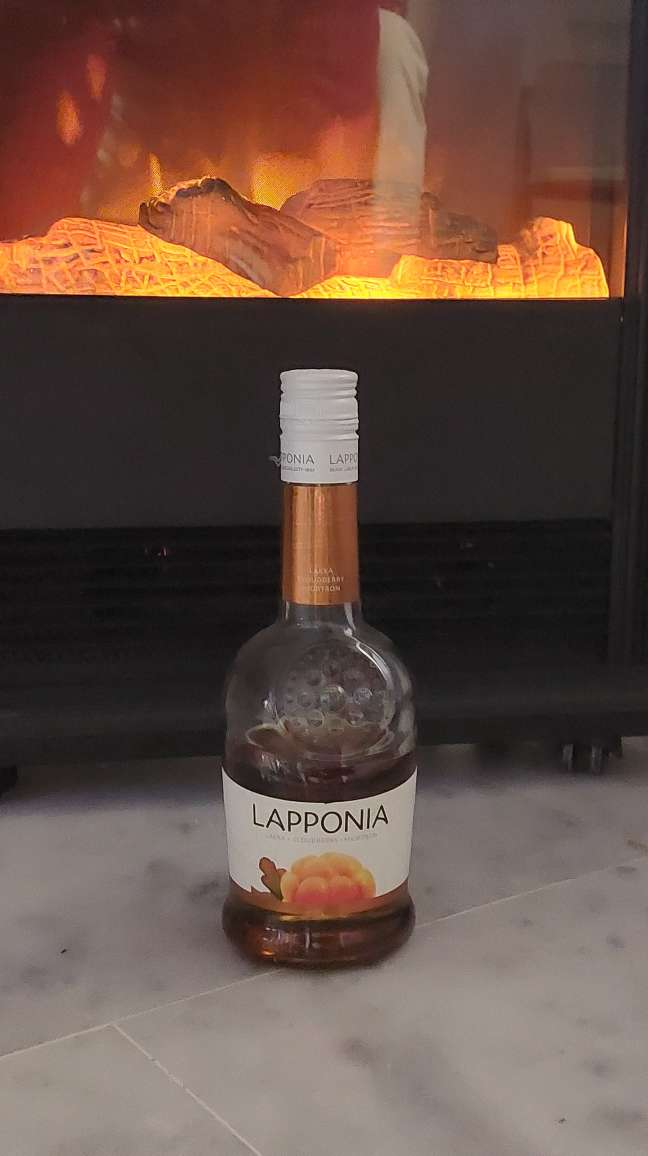
Lapponia cloudberry liqueur produced in Finland

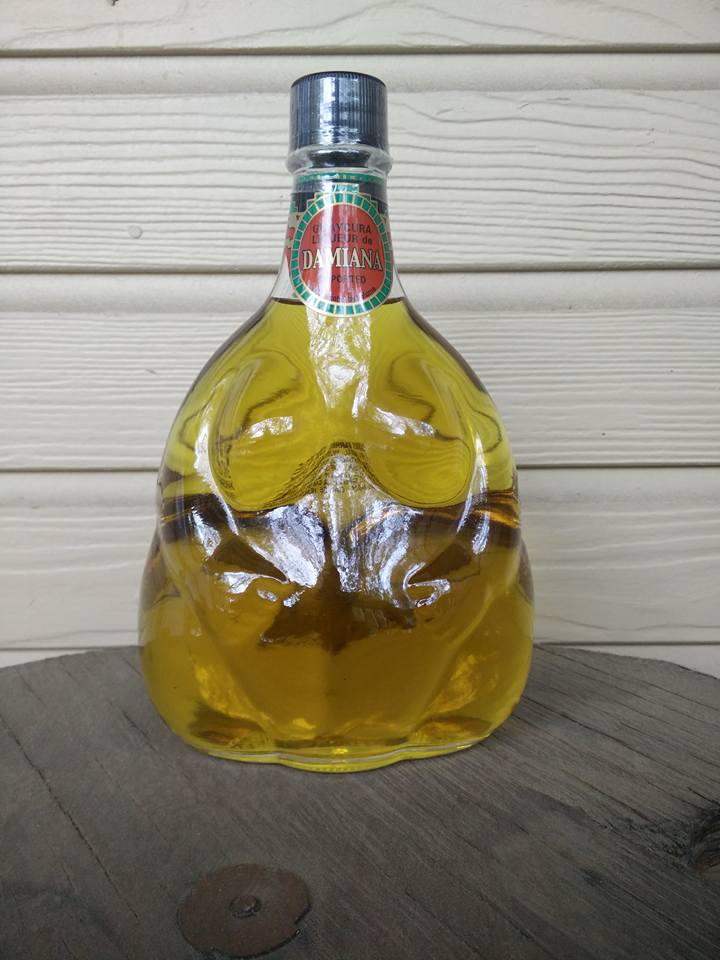
Damiana-based liqueur of Mexico

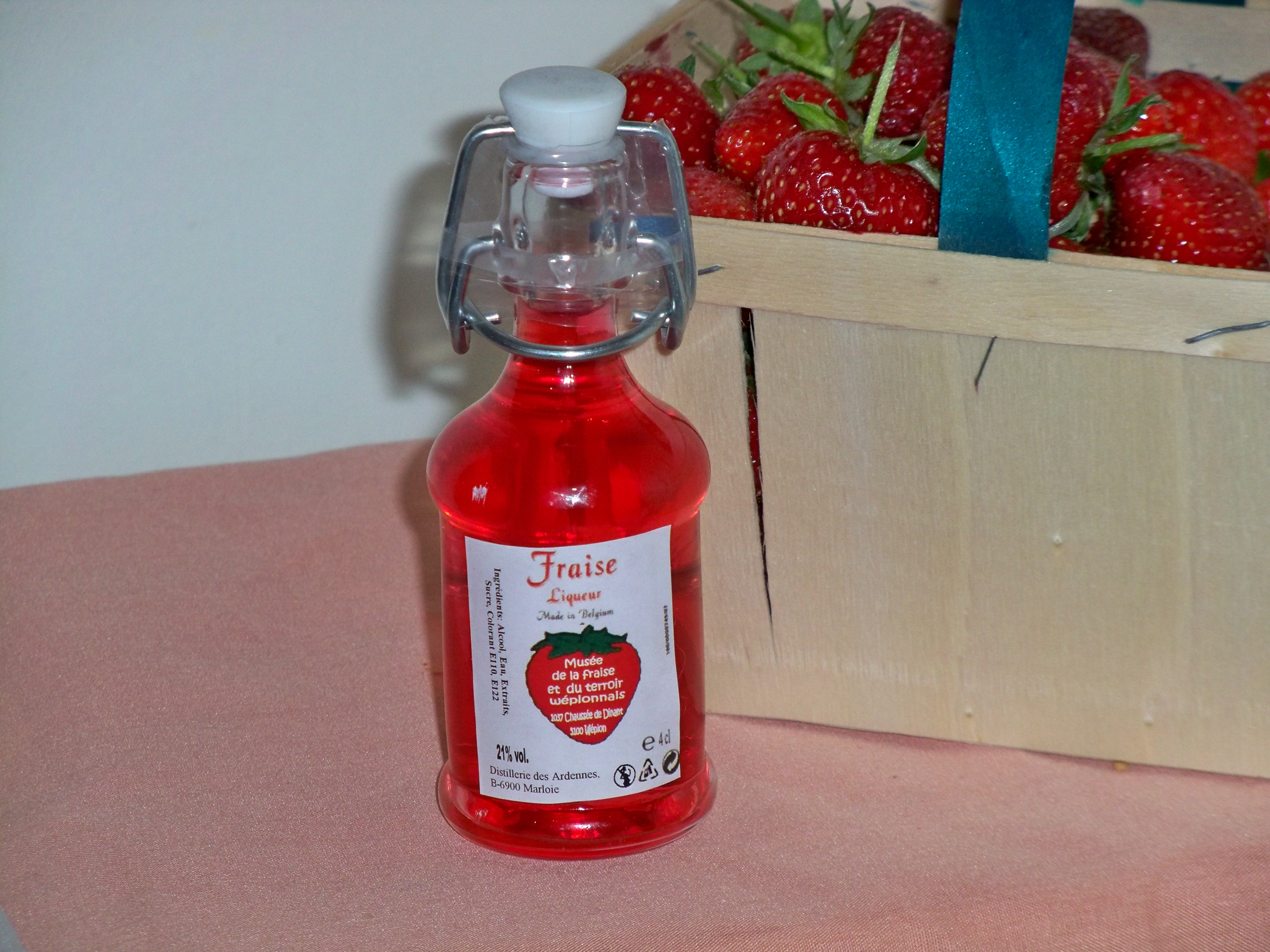
Fraise strawberry liqueur from the Ardennes, Belgium

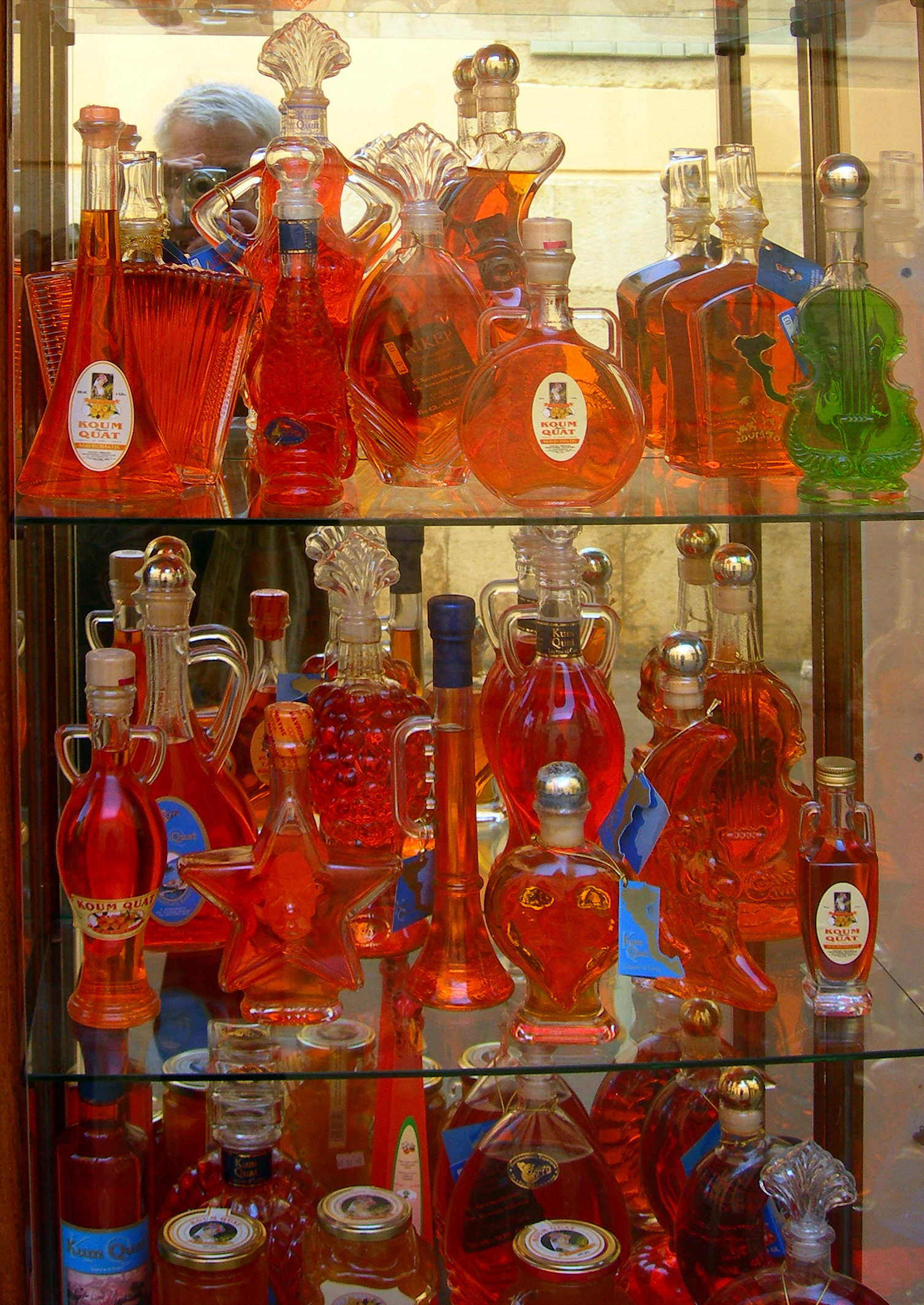
Kumquat liqueurs from Corfu

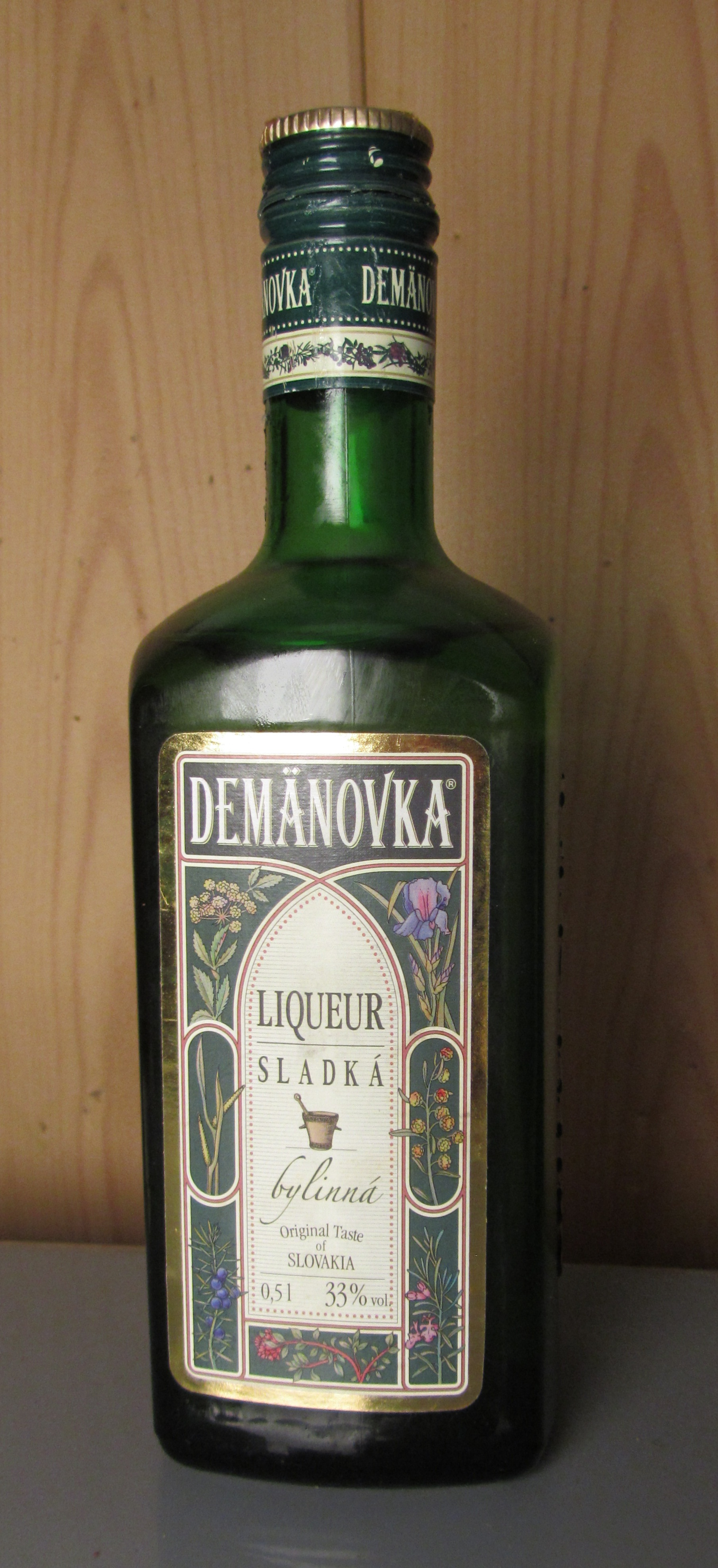
Demänovka is a traditional Slovak liqueur produced since 1867

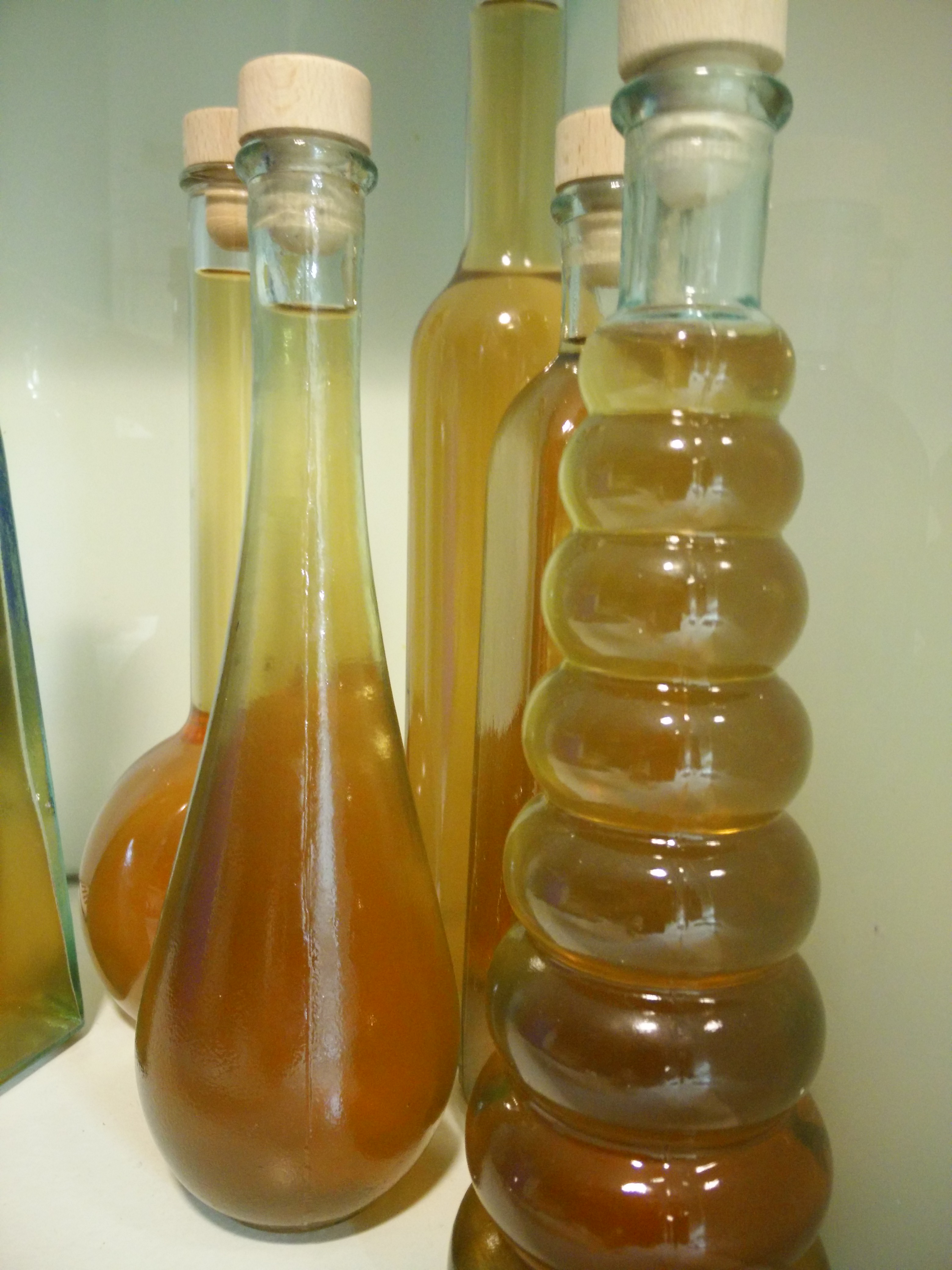
Homemade elder flower liqueur

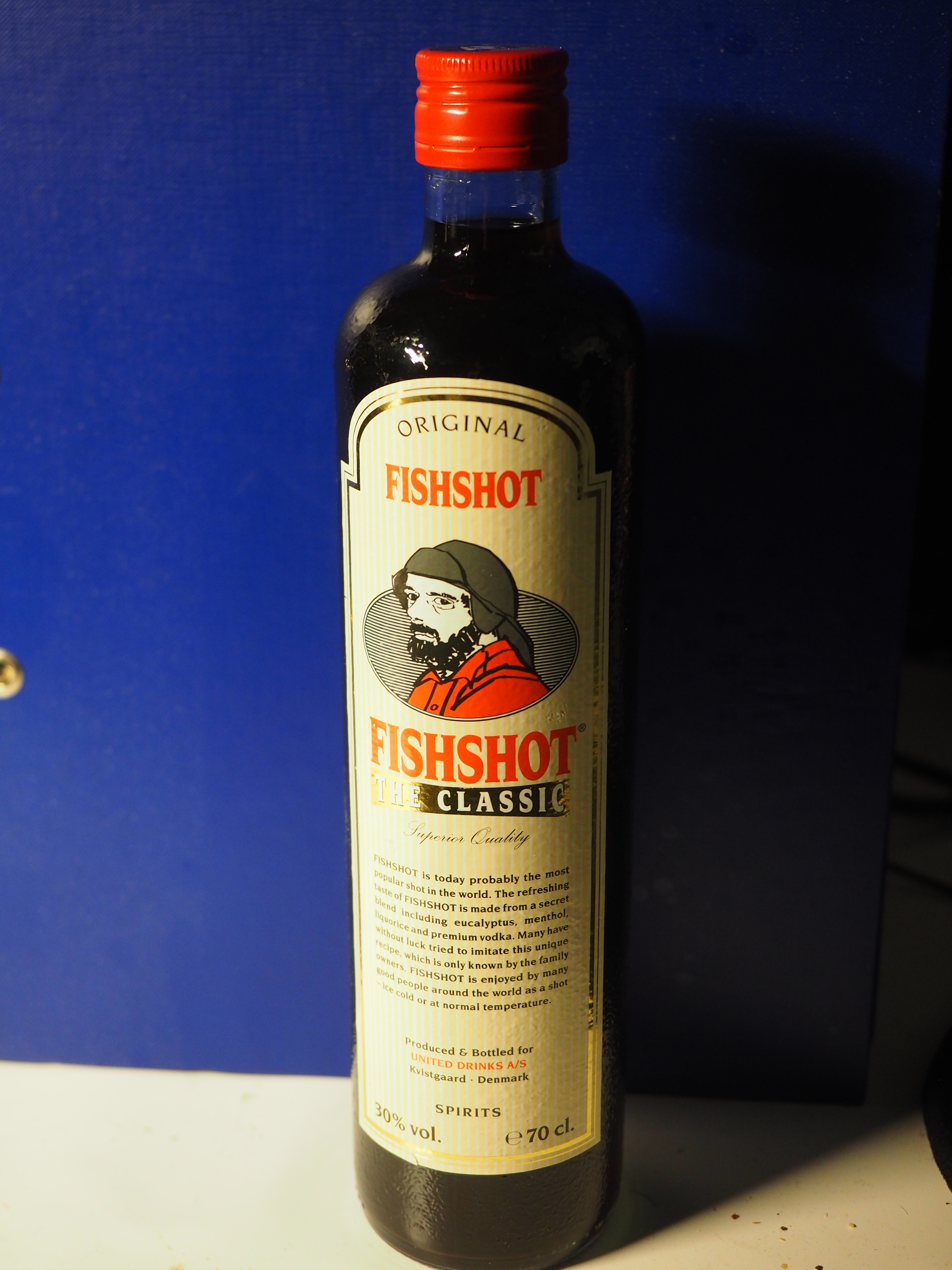
Fish Shot is a liqueur with a Fisherman's Friend flavour

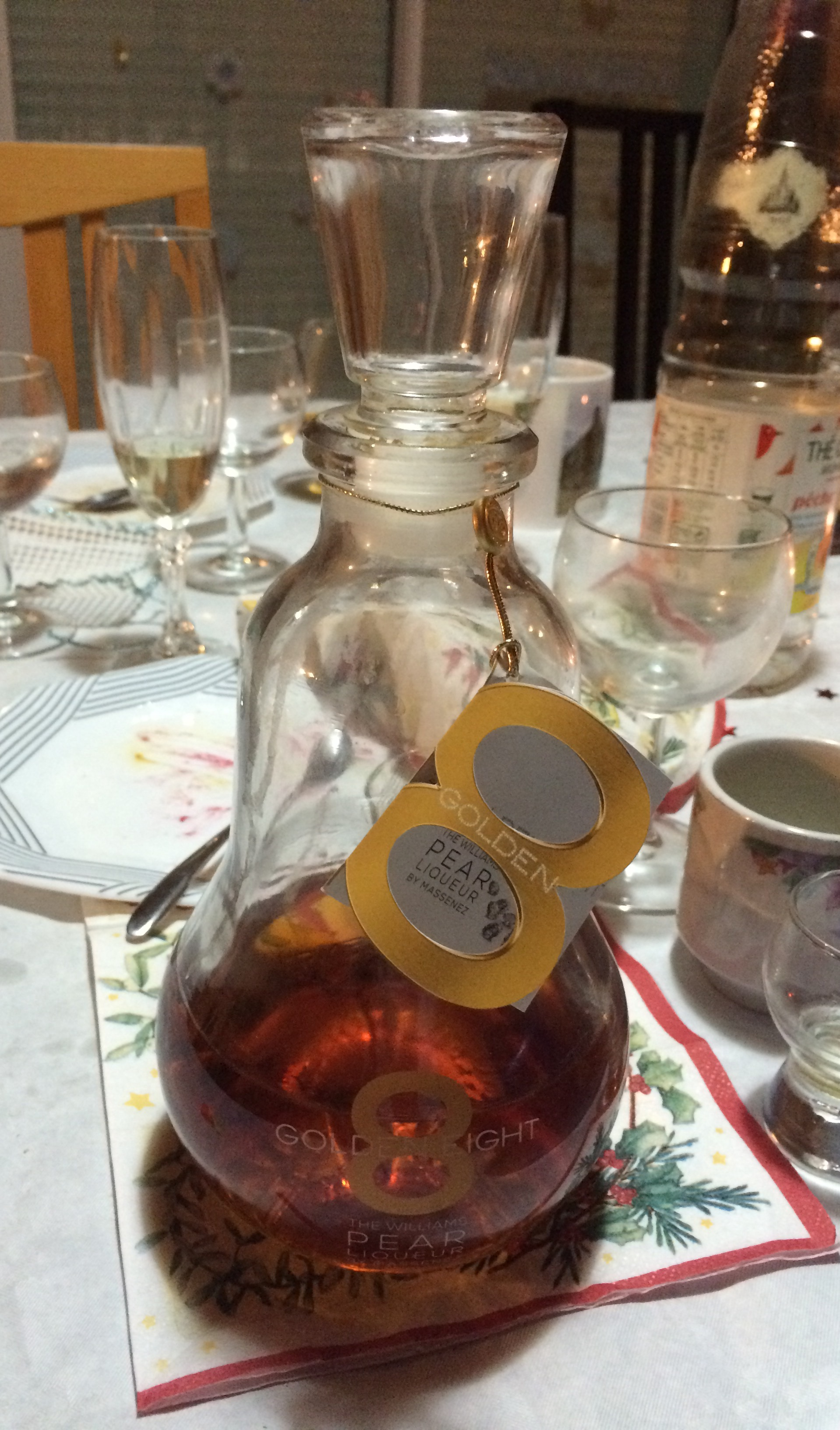
Poire William (Williams Pear) Liqueur by Massenez

== Health concerns ==
Alcohol-based sugar-sweetened beverages, are closely linked to heavy episodic drinking in adolescents.

== See also ==
- Amaro (liqueur)
- Cordial (medicine)
- Cream liqueur
- Crème liqueur
- Dessert wine
- Fortified wine
- Honey liqueurs and spirits (category page)
- Lemon liqueur
- Nalewka
- Schnapps
- Sloe gin
- Southern Comfort
- Yukon Jack (liqueur)
- List of liqueurs
