= Baileys Irish Cream =

Liqueur

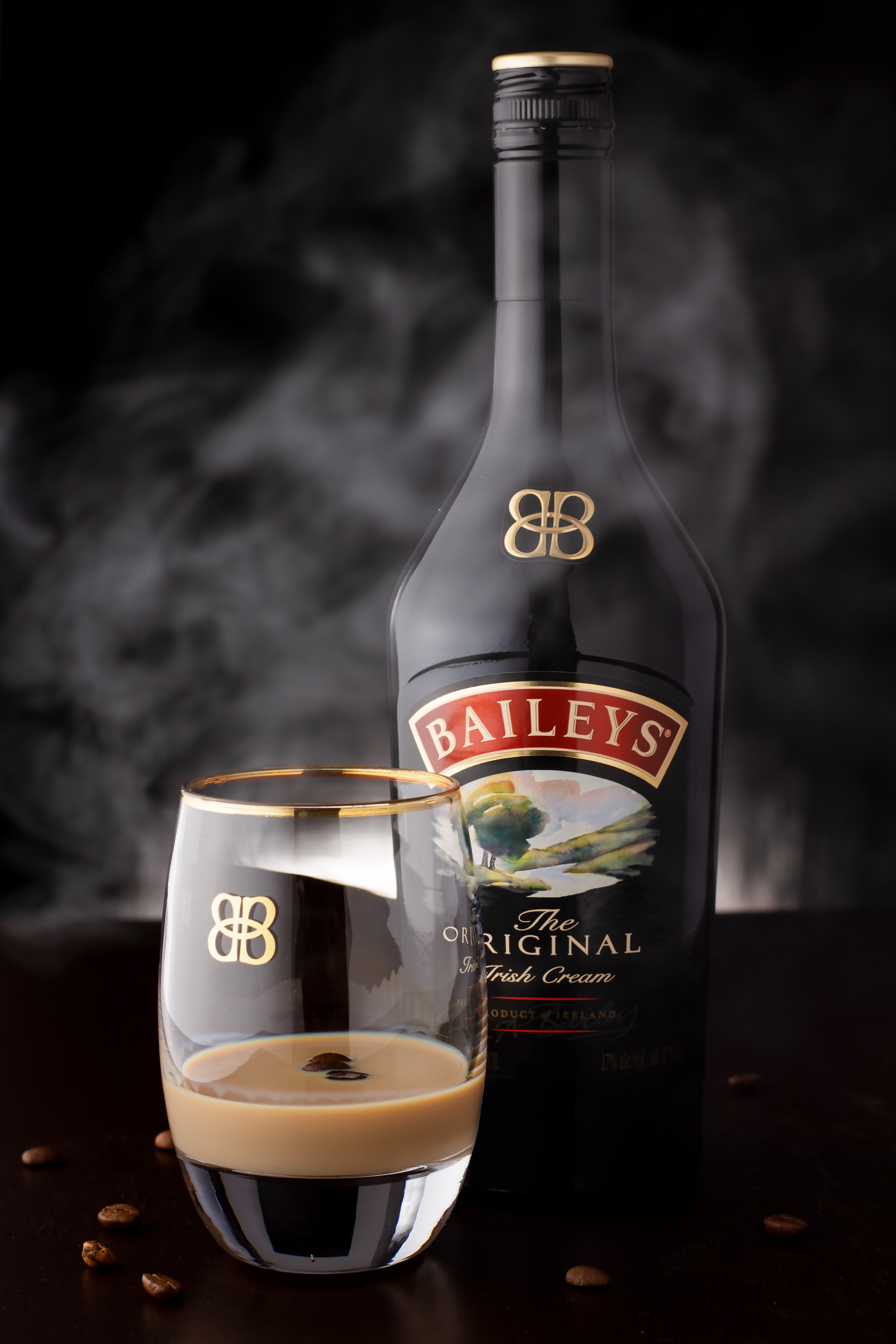
- Baileys Irish Cream
- Type: Liqueur
- Manufacturer: Diageo; previously Gilbeys of Ireland
- Distributor: Diageo
- Origin: Ireland
- Introduced: 1974; 52 years ago
- Alcohol by volume: 17.0%
- Website: Official website

Baileys Irish Cream is a liqueur made of cream, cocoa and Irish whiskey emulsified with vegetable oil. Baileys is made by Diageo at Nangor Road, in Dublin, Ireland, and in Mallusk, Northern Ireland. It is the original Irish cream, invented by a team headed by Tom Jago in 1971 for Gilbeys of Ireland; Diageo owns the trademark. It has a declared alcohol content of 17% by volume.

== History and origin ==
Baileys Irish Cream was created in London by advertising executive Tom Jago, working from a marketing brief issued by Gilbeys of Ireland, a division of International Distillers & Vintners. Gilbeys was searching for something to introduce to the international market. The process of finding a product began in 1971, and production research began in earnest after consultants David Gluckman, Hugh Seymour-Davies and Mac Macpherson came up with an alcoholic drink made of Irish whiskey and cream that, they remarked, "didn't taste punishing". David Gluckman also came up with the idea of naming it "Baileys", after "Bailey’s Bistro", a tiny restaurant beneath their office in Greek Street, Soho, London, next to the Pillars of Hercules pub.

The formulation of Baileys was motivated partly by the availability of alcohol from a money-losing distillery (part of International Distillers & Vintners, and probably W&A Gilbey) and a desire to use surplus cream from another business, Express Dairies, owned by Grand Metropolitan, resulting from the increased popularity of semi-skimmed milk. It included alcohol, cream and the chocolate milk-based drink powder Nesquik produced by Nestle; the initial formulation process took approximately 45 minutes.

Baileys was introduced in 1974 as the first Irish cream on the market. The name is that of a restaurant owned by John Chesterman, who granted W&A Gilbey permission to use it. The fictional R.A. Bailey signature was inspired by The Bailey's Hotel in London, though the registered trademark omits the apostrophe.

== Manufacture ==
Cream and Irish whiskey from various distilleries are homogenised to form an emulsion with the aid of an emulsifier containing refined vegetable oil. The process prevents the separation of alcohol and cream during storage. Baileys contains a proprietary cocoa extract recipe giving Baileys its chocolate character and essence. The number of other ingredients is not open to the public, but they include herbs, sugar, vanilla and caramel.

According to the manufacturer, no preservatives are required as the alcohol content preserves the cream. The cream used in the drink comes from Tirlán, an Irish dairy company. Tirlán's Virginia facility in County Cavan produces a range of fat-filled milk powders and fresh cream. It has been the principal cream supplier to Baileys Irish Cream Liqueurs for more than 30 years. At busier times of the year, Tirlán also supplies cream from its Ballyragget facility in Kilkenny. Baileys bottles are manufactured solely at Encirc Glass Plant in Derrylin, County Fermanagh.

== Shelf life ==
The manufacturer claims Baileys Irish Cream has a shelf life of 24 months and guarantees its taste for two years from the day it was made—opened or unopened, refrigerated or not—when stored away from direct sunlight at temperatures between 0 and 25 °C (32 and 77 °F).

== Nutritional values ==
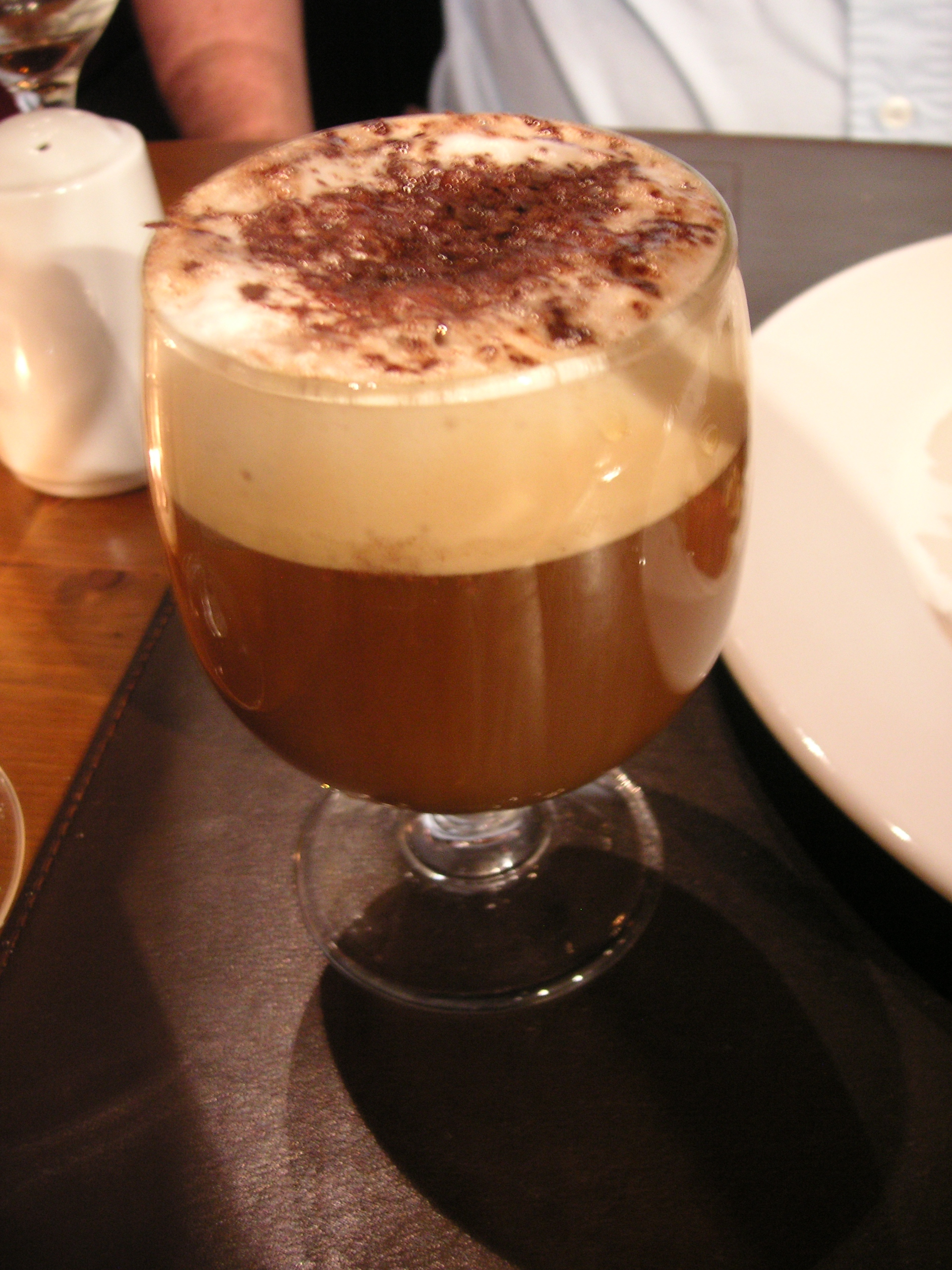
Baileys and coffee

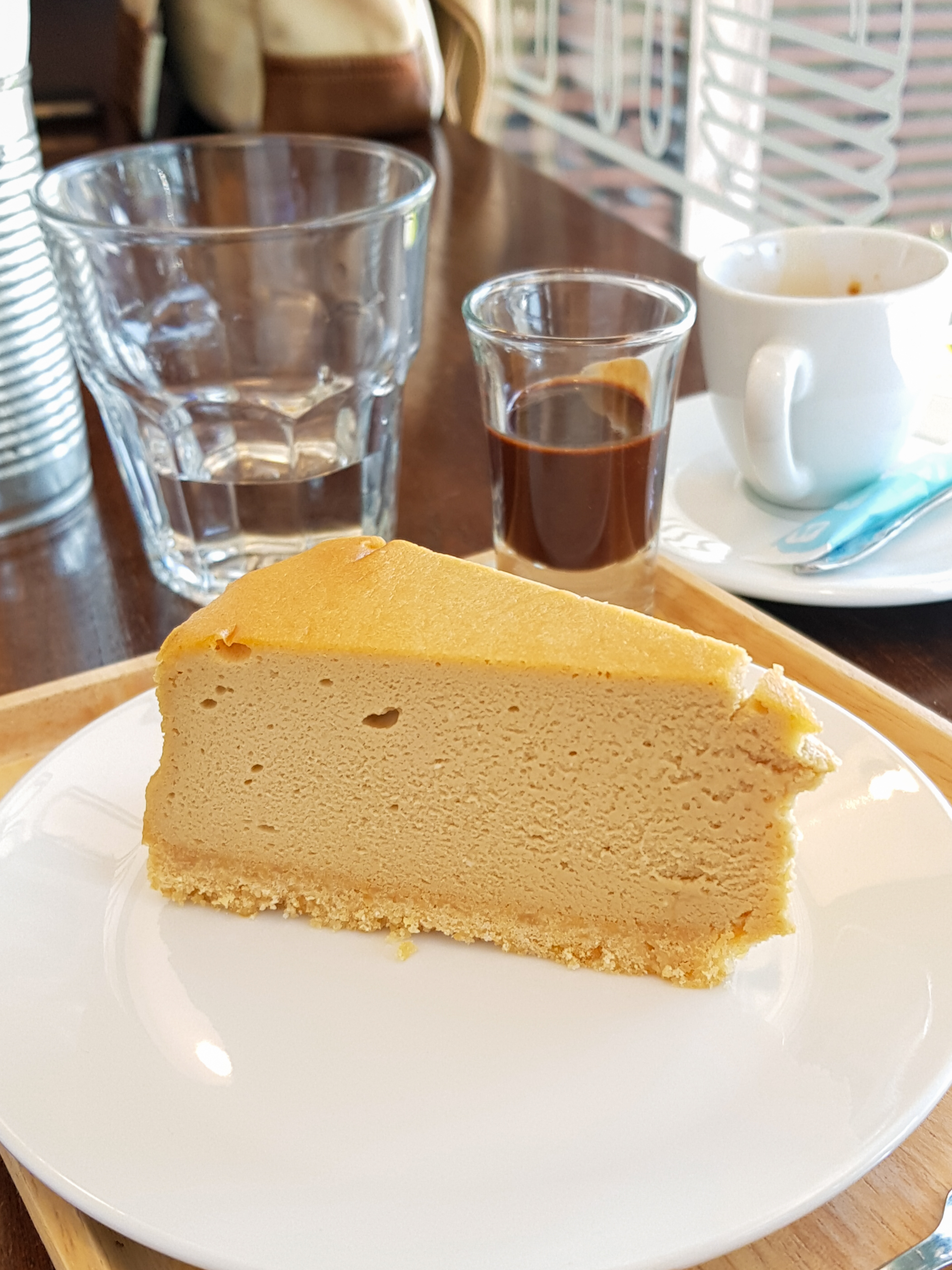
Baileys cheesecake served with a Baileys-and-chocolate sauce on the side

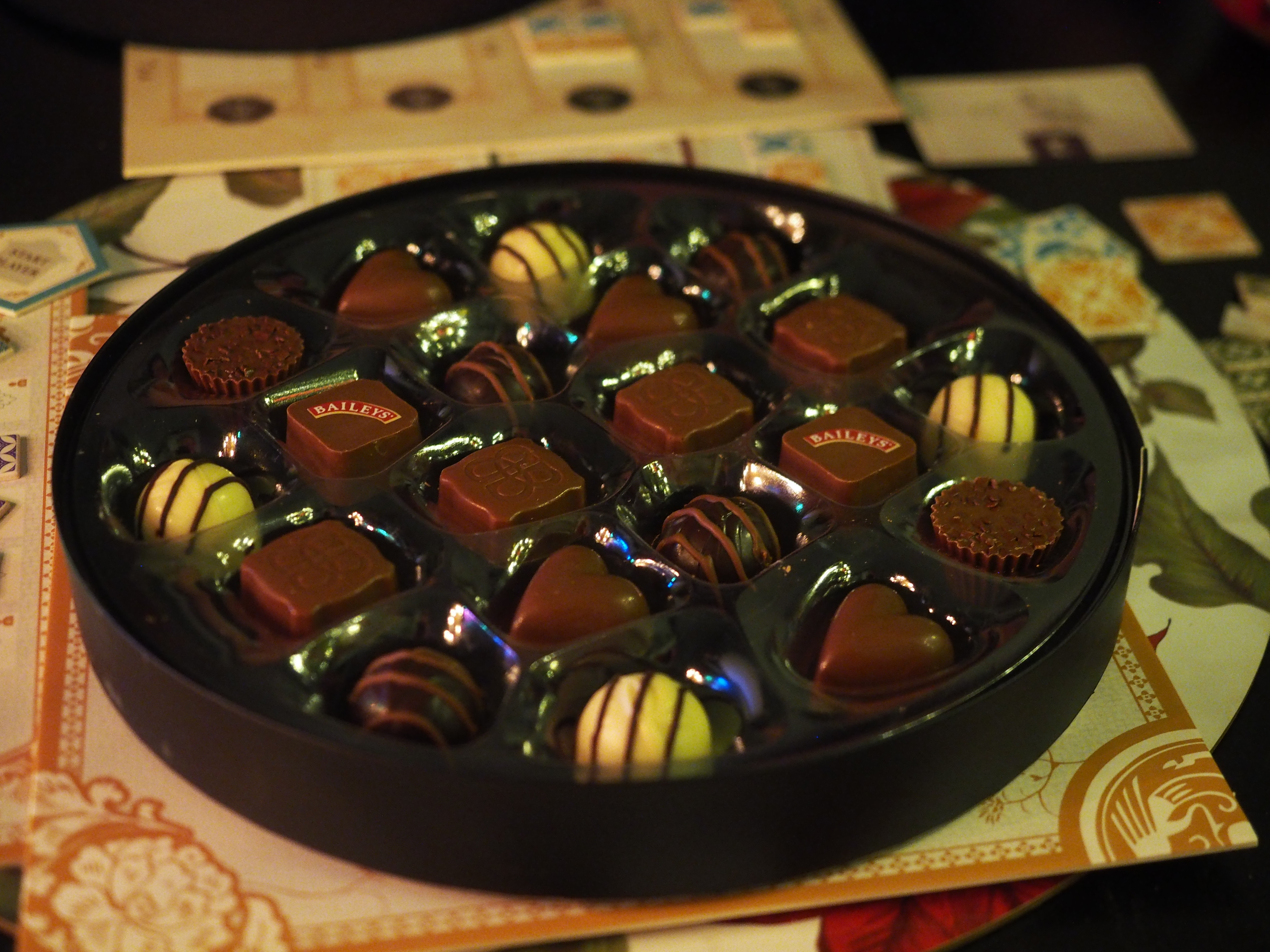
Chocolate pralines infused with Baileys Irish Cream

Nutritional information for Baileys, values per 100 ml:
Fat	14 g
Carbohydrate	24 g
Protein	3 g
Energy	1,345 kJ (327 kcal)

== Drinking ==
As with milk, cream will curdle whenever it comes into contact with a weak acid. Milk and cream contain casein, which coagulates when mixed with weak acids such as lemon, tonic water, or traces of wine. While this outcome is undesirable in most situations, some cocktails (such as the cement mixer, which consists of a shot of Baileys mixed with the squeezed juice from a slice of lime) specifically encourage coagulation.

== Variant flavours ==
In 2003, Bailey & Co. launched Baileys Glide, aimed at the alcopop market. It was discontinued in 2006.

In 2005, Baileys launched mint chocolate and crème caramel variants at 17% ABV. They were originally released in UK airports and were subsequently released in the mass markets of the UK, US, Australia and Canada in 2006.

In 2008, Baileys, after the success of previous flavour variants, released a coffee variant, followed by a hazelnut-flavoured variant in 2010. The company trialled a new premium variety, Baileys Gold, at several European airports in 2009. The Gold version also was marketed towards the Japanese consumer. 2011, Baileys launched a Biscotti flavour, and a sub-brand premium product Baileys Chocolat Luxe, which combined Belgian chocolate with Baileys, in 2013. The company released a Vanilla-Cinnamon variety in the US market in 2013, with further flavours Pumpkin Spice, Espresso and Salted Caramel launching the following year.

From 2016 to 2018, Baileys Coffee Mocha and Latte was available in cans across the UK and Europe. In 2017, Baileys launched their Pumpkin Spice flavoured liqueur, as well as their vegan-friendly Baileys Almande, described as a blend of "sweet almond oil, cane sugar and a touch of real vanilla".

Baileys have continued to release new varieties, including Strawberries & Cream (2018), Red Velvet Cupcake (2019), Apple Pie (2020), Pina Colada (2021 & 2023), S'more (2022), Vanilla Mint Shake (2023), Cinnamon Churros (2024), Cinnamon Swirl (2025), and Terry's Chocolate Orange (2025 & 2026).

== See also ==
- Irish cream
- Irish coffee
