= Cuisine of Philadelphia =

The cuisine of Philadelphia, Pennsylvania, United States, was shaped largely by the city's mixture of ethnicities, available foodstuffs and history. Certain foods have become associated with the city.

Invented in Philadelphia in the 1930s, the cheesesteak is the most well known, and soft pretzels have long been a major part of Philadelphia culture.

The late 19th and early 20th centuries saw the creation of two Philadelphia landmarks offering an array of food options, the Reading Terminal Market and the Italian Market. After a dismal restaurant scene during the post-war era of the 20th century, the 1970s brought a restaurant renaissance that has continued into the 21st century.

Many foods and drinks associated with Philadelphia can also commonly be linked with Pennsylvania Dutch cuisine and Italian-American cuisine.

== Innovations ==
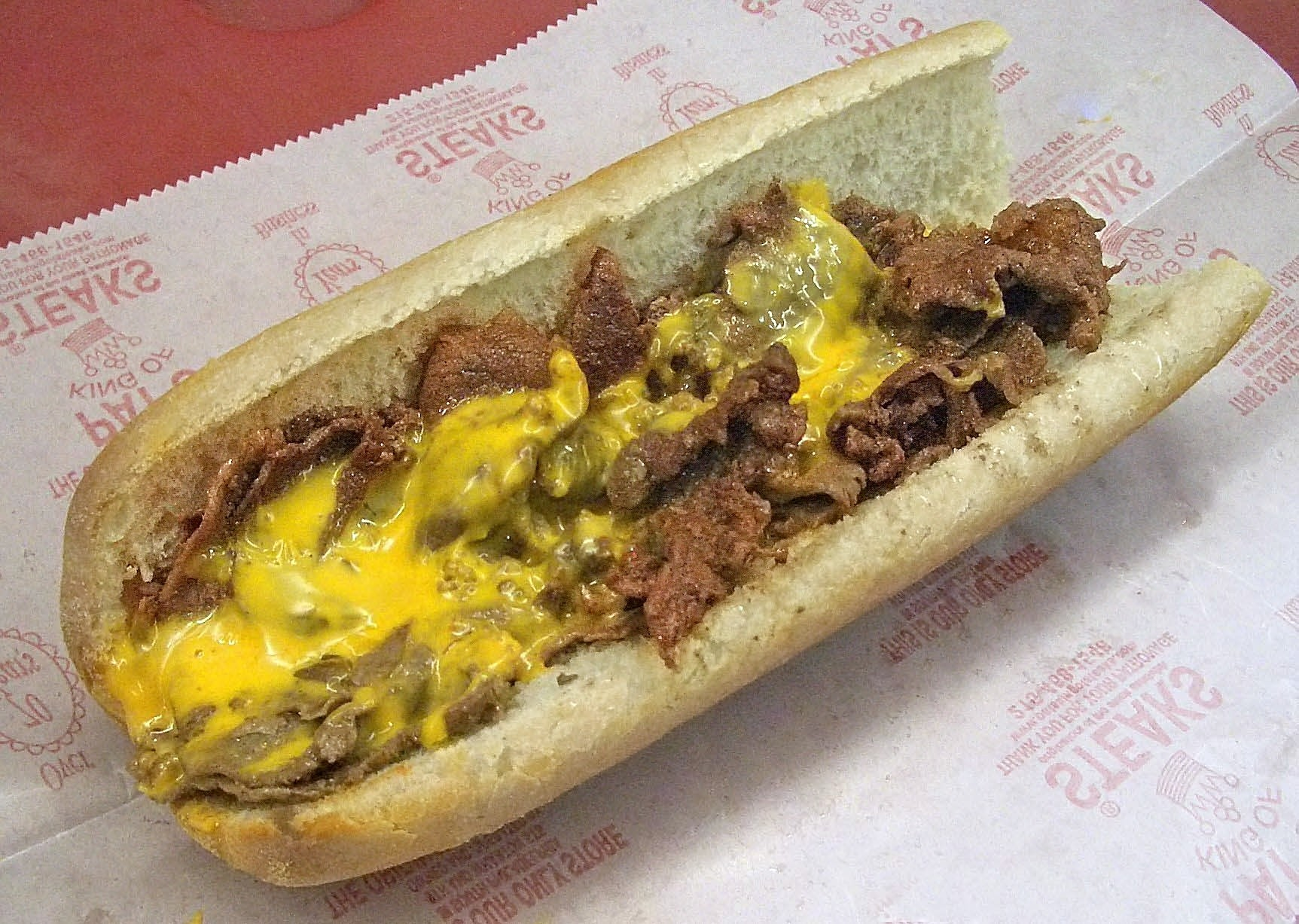
A Philadelphia cheesesteak "wiz wit"—that is, with steak, Cheez Whiz, and onions

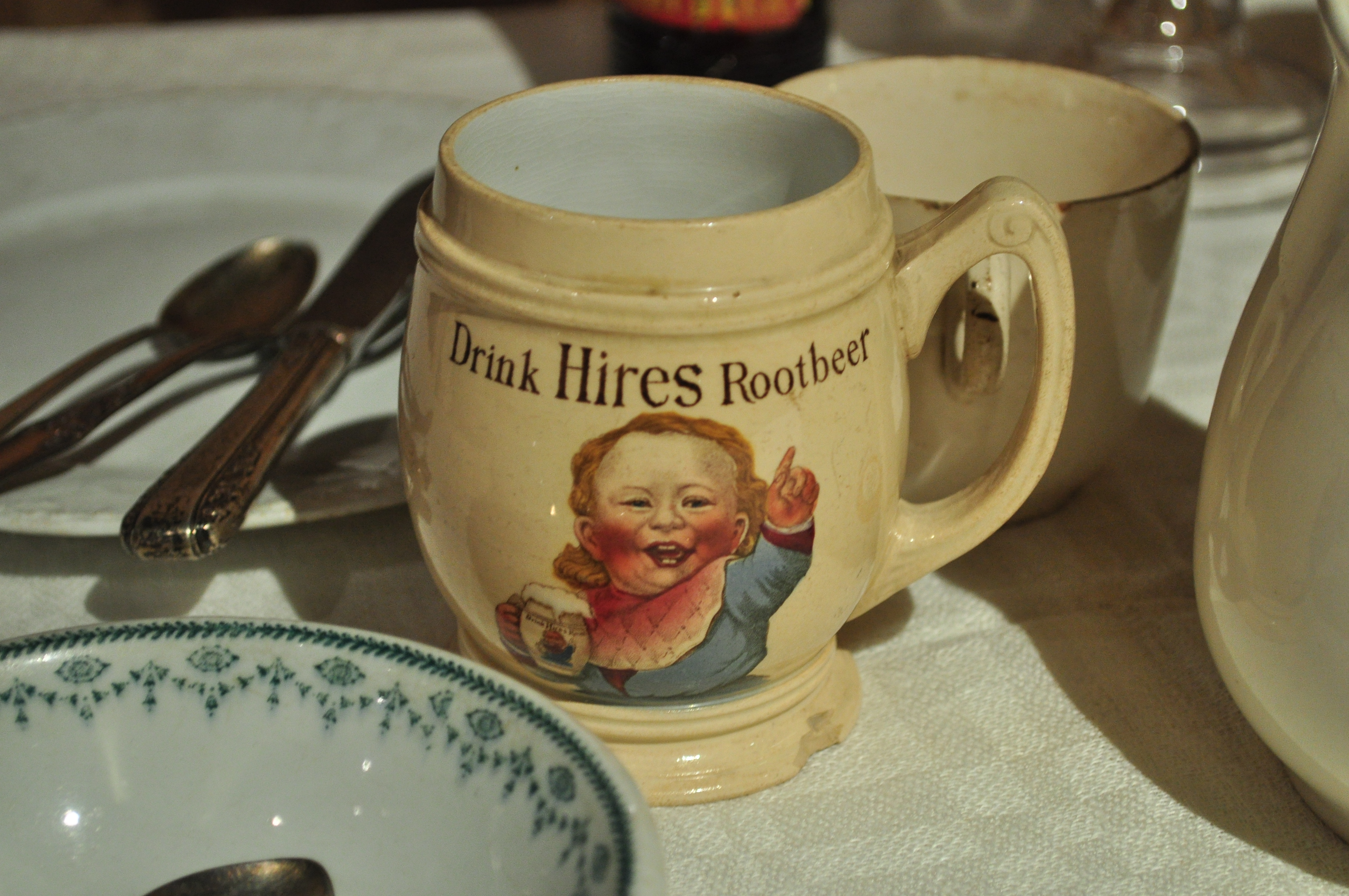
A Hires Root Beer mug from the 1930s or earlier

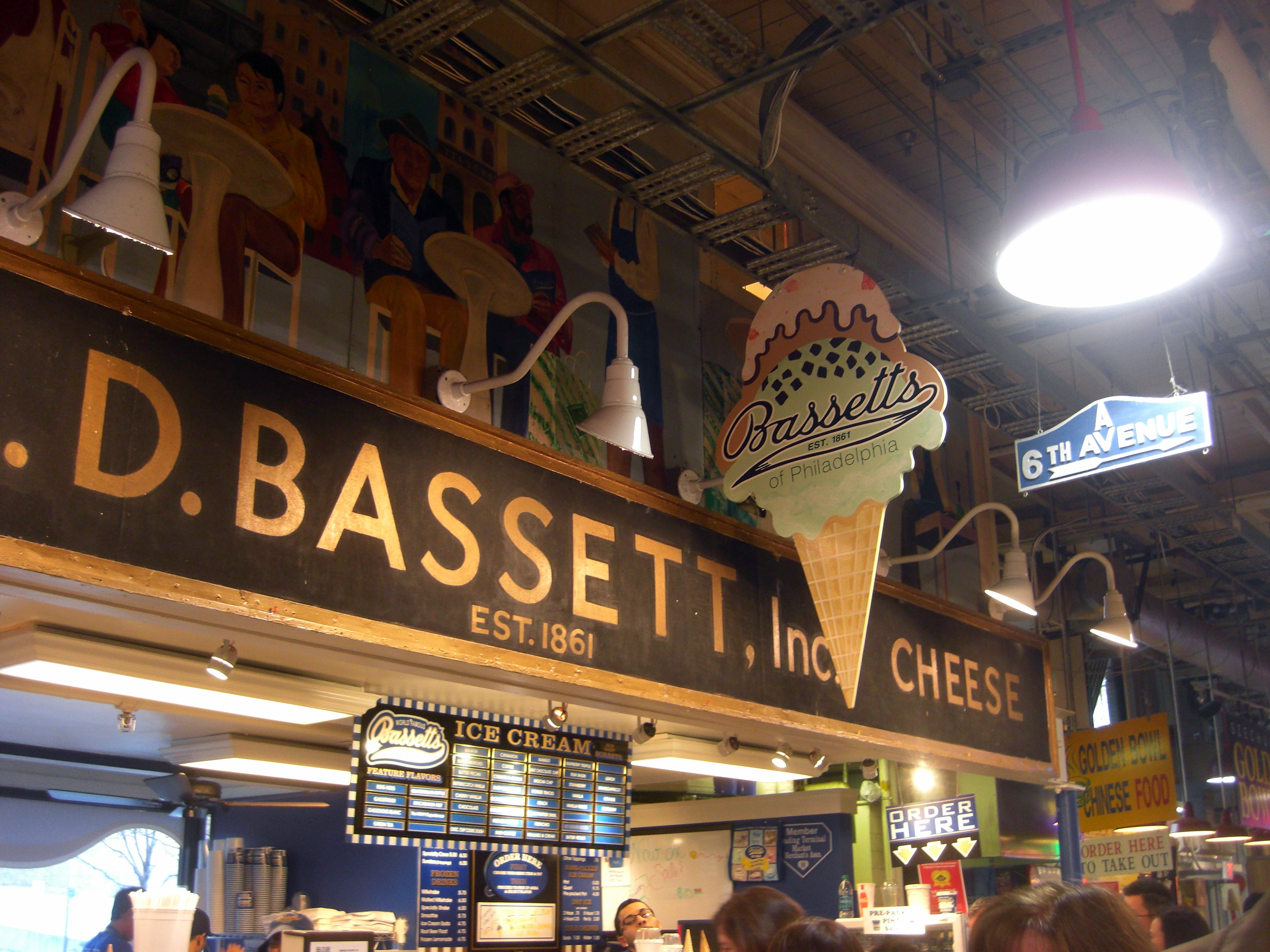
Bassetts Ice Cream at Reading Terminal Market

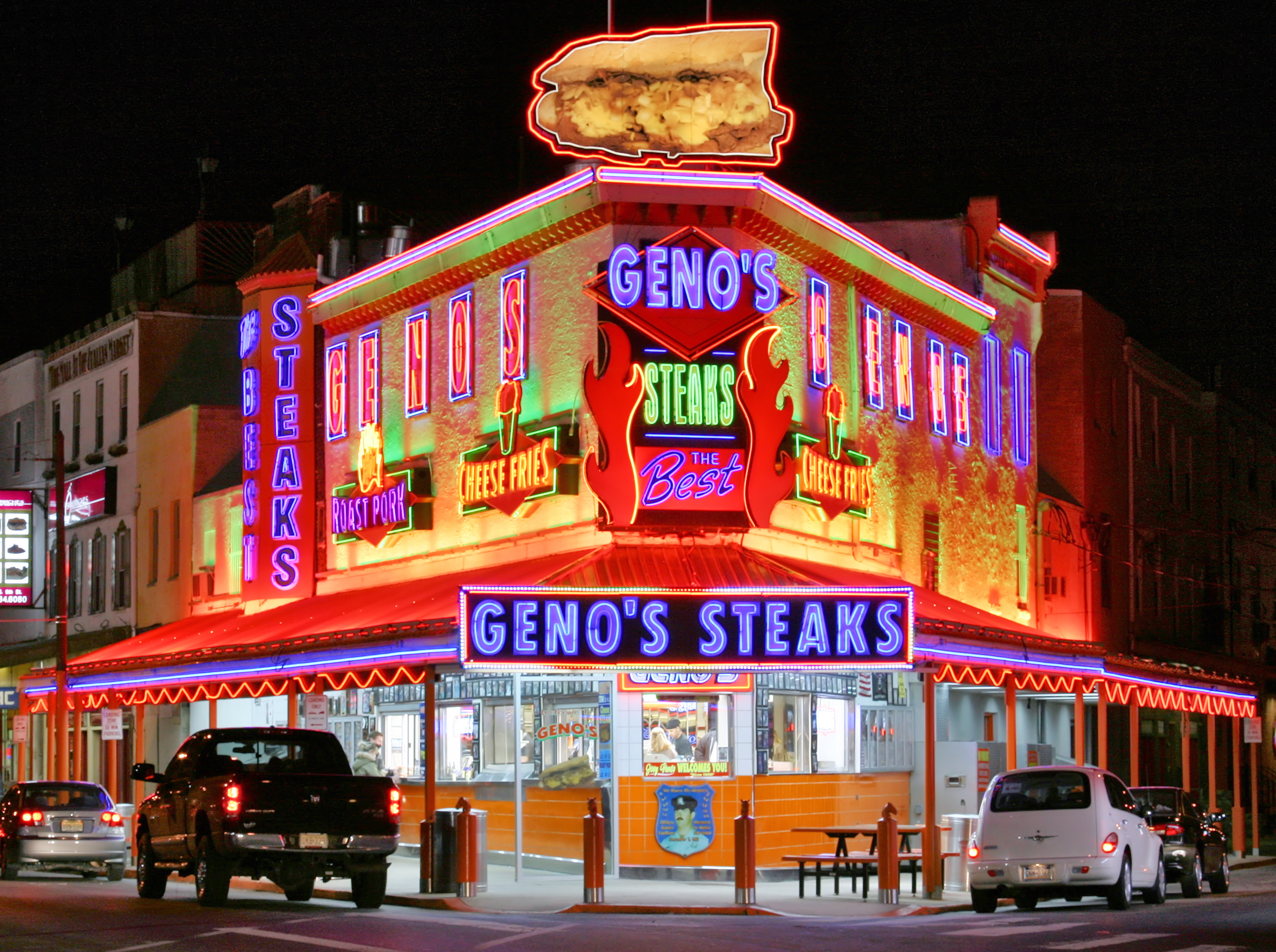
Geno's Steaks

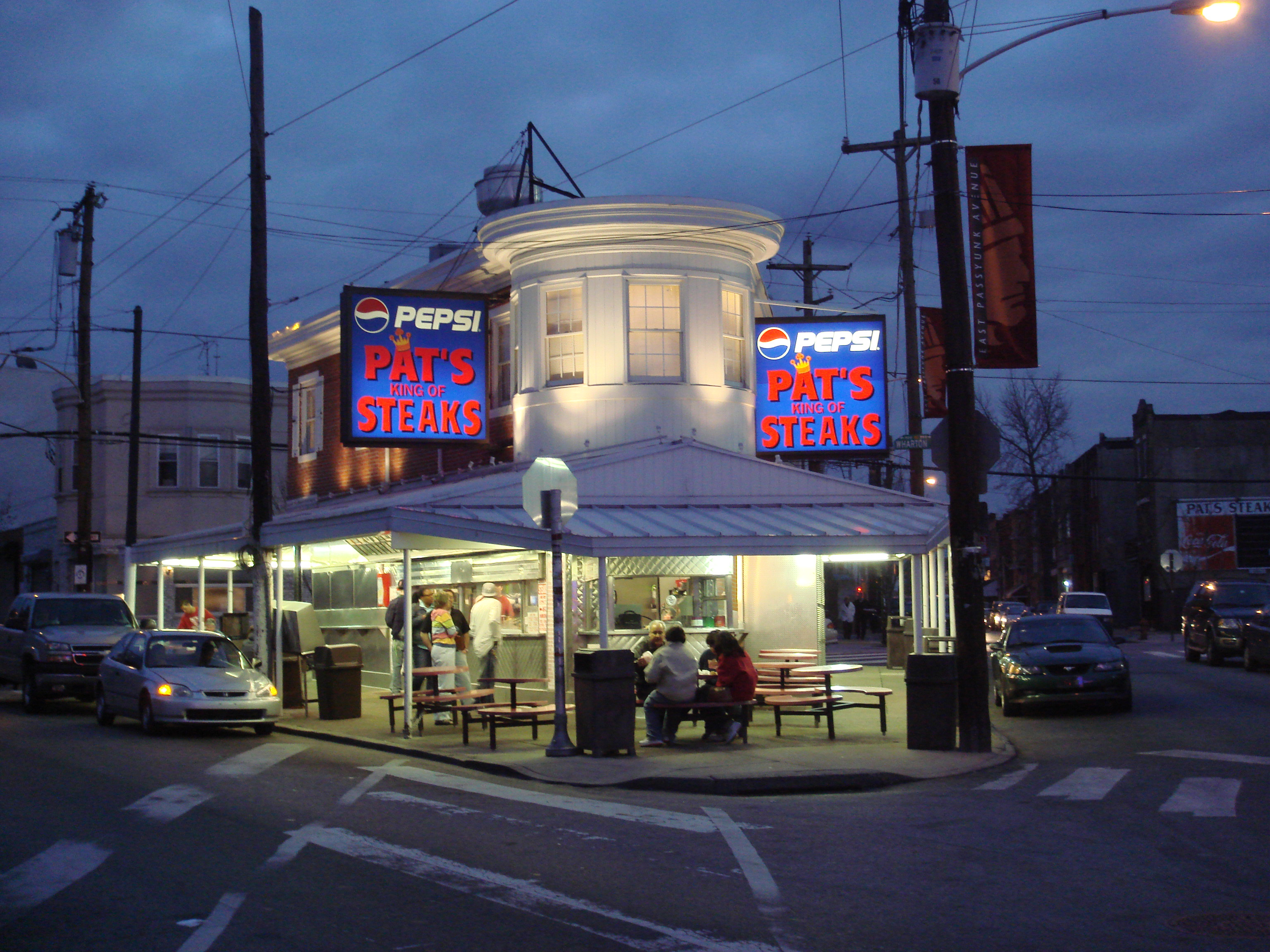
Pat's Steaks

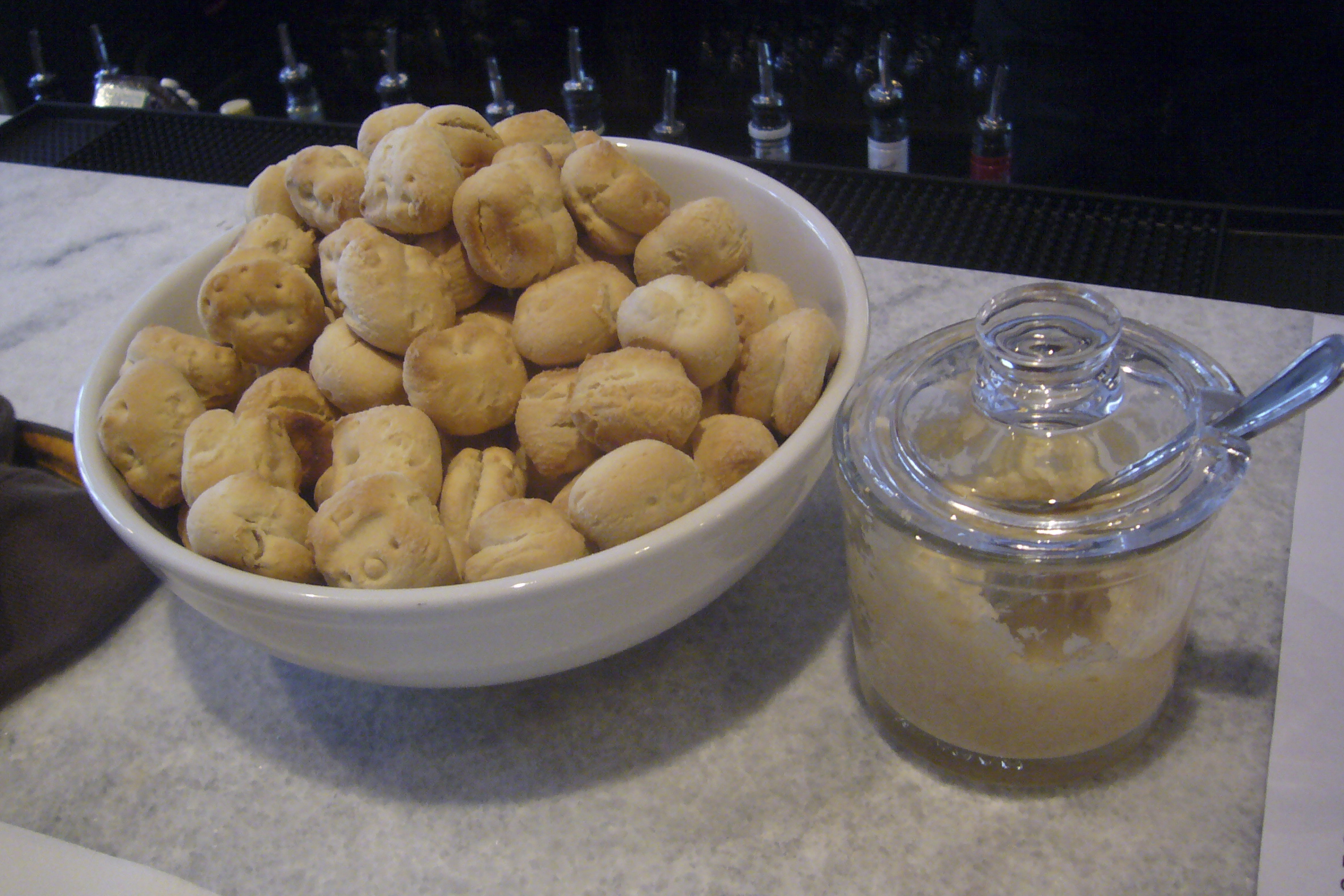
Oyster crackers, also known as water crackers, Philadelphia crackers, and Trenton crackers

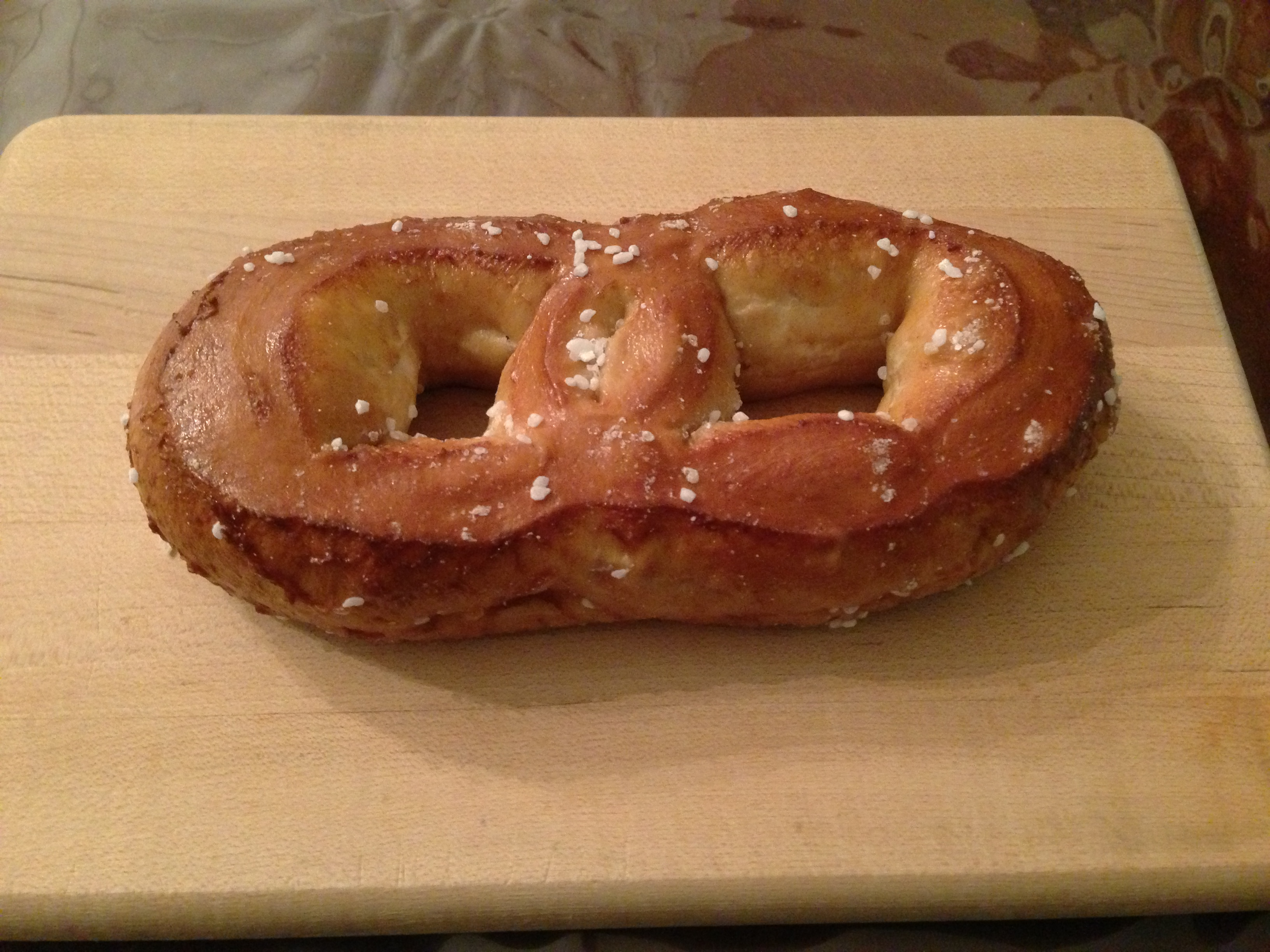
A Philly-style soft pretzel

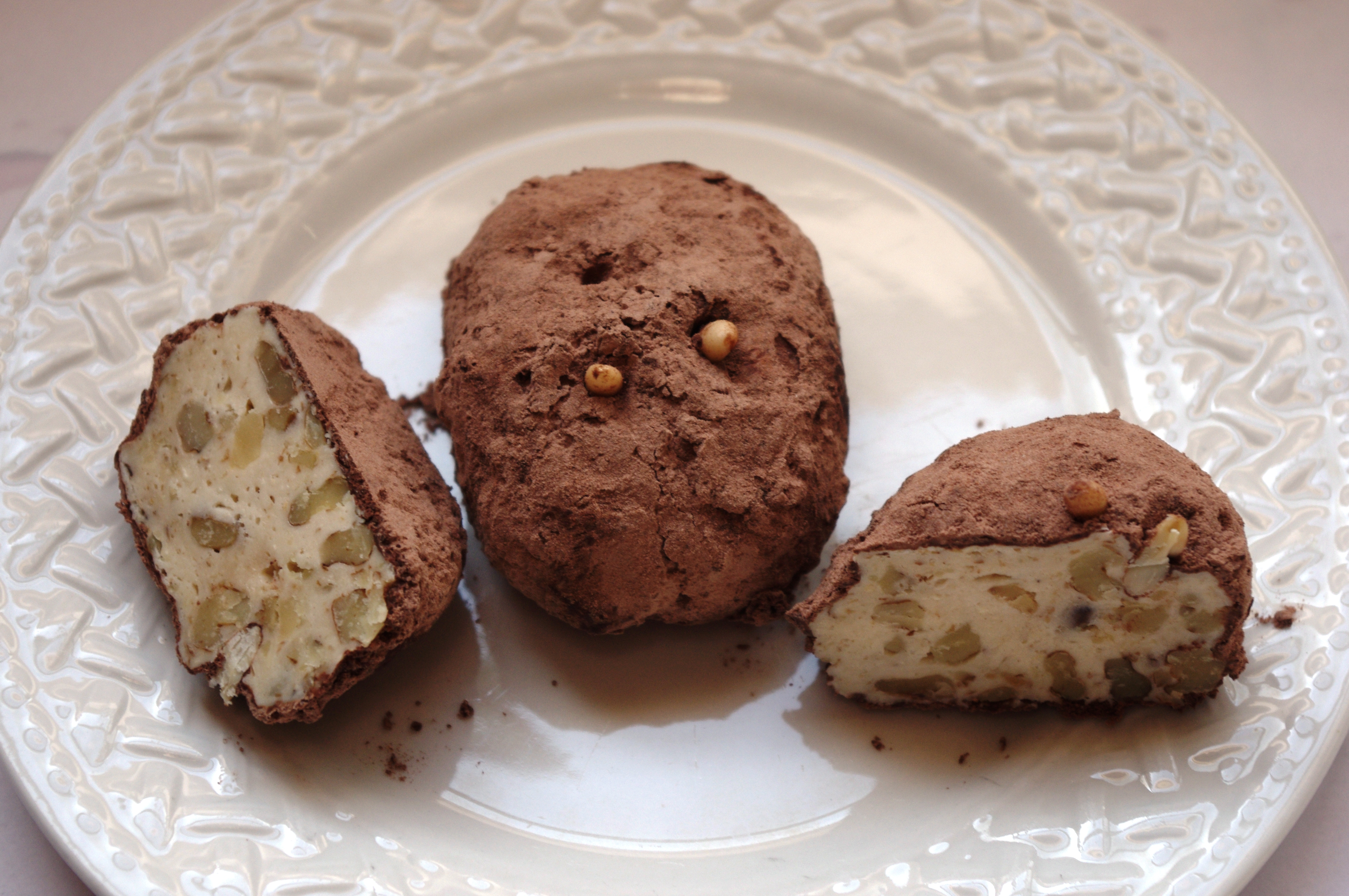
Irish potato candy

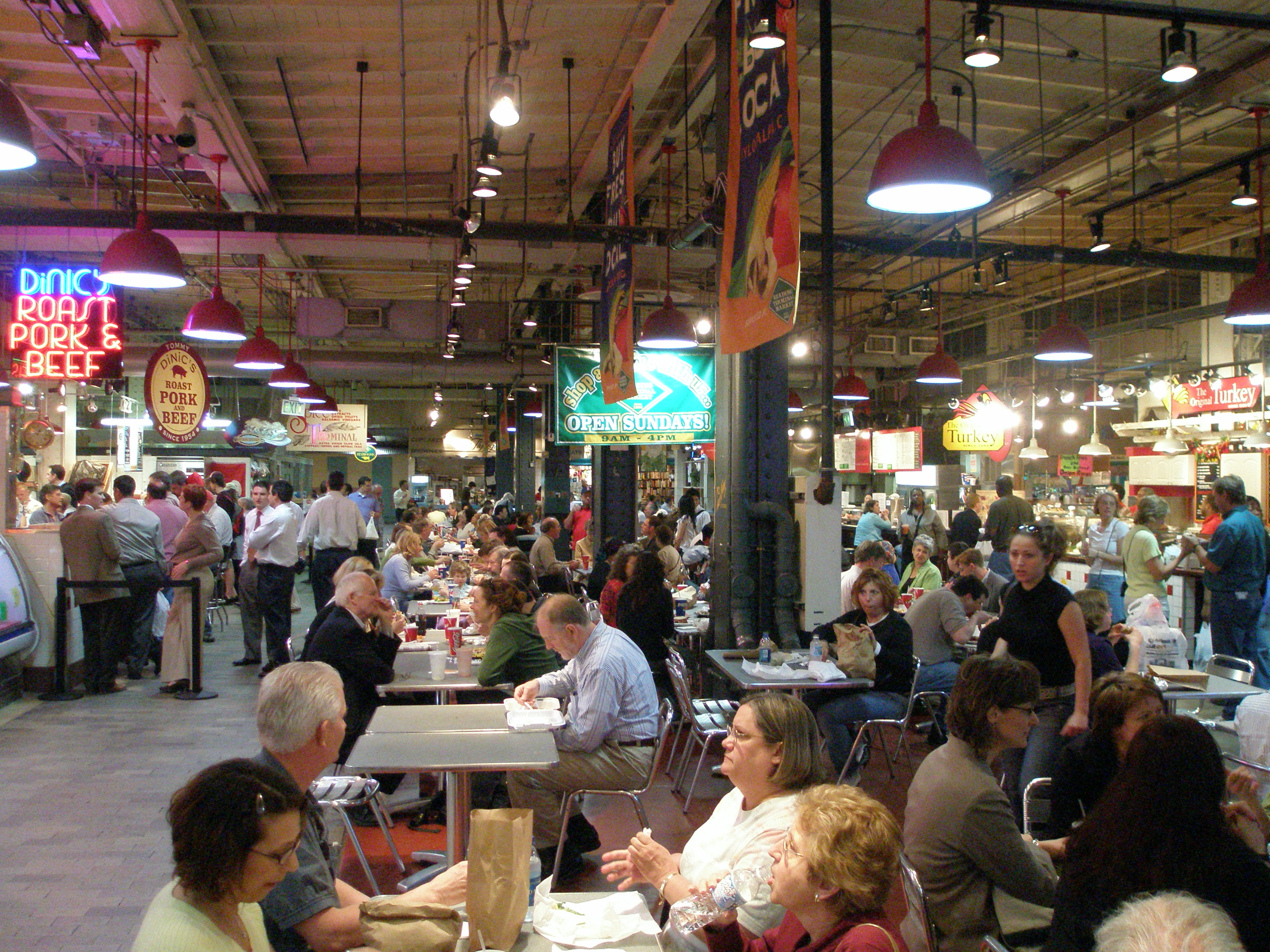
Center Court at Reading Terminal Market

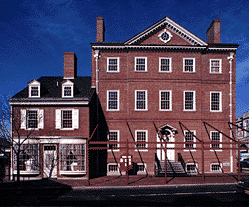
City Tavern

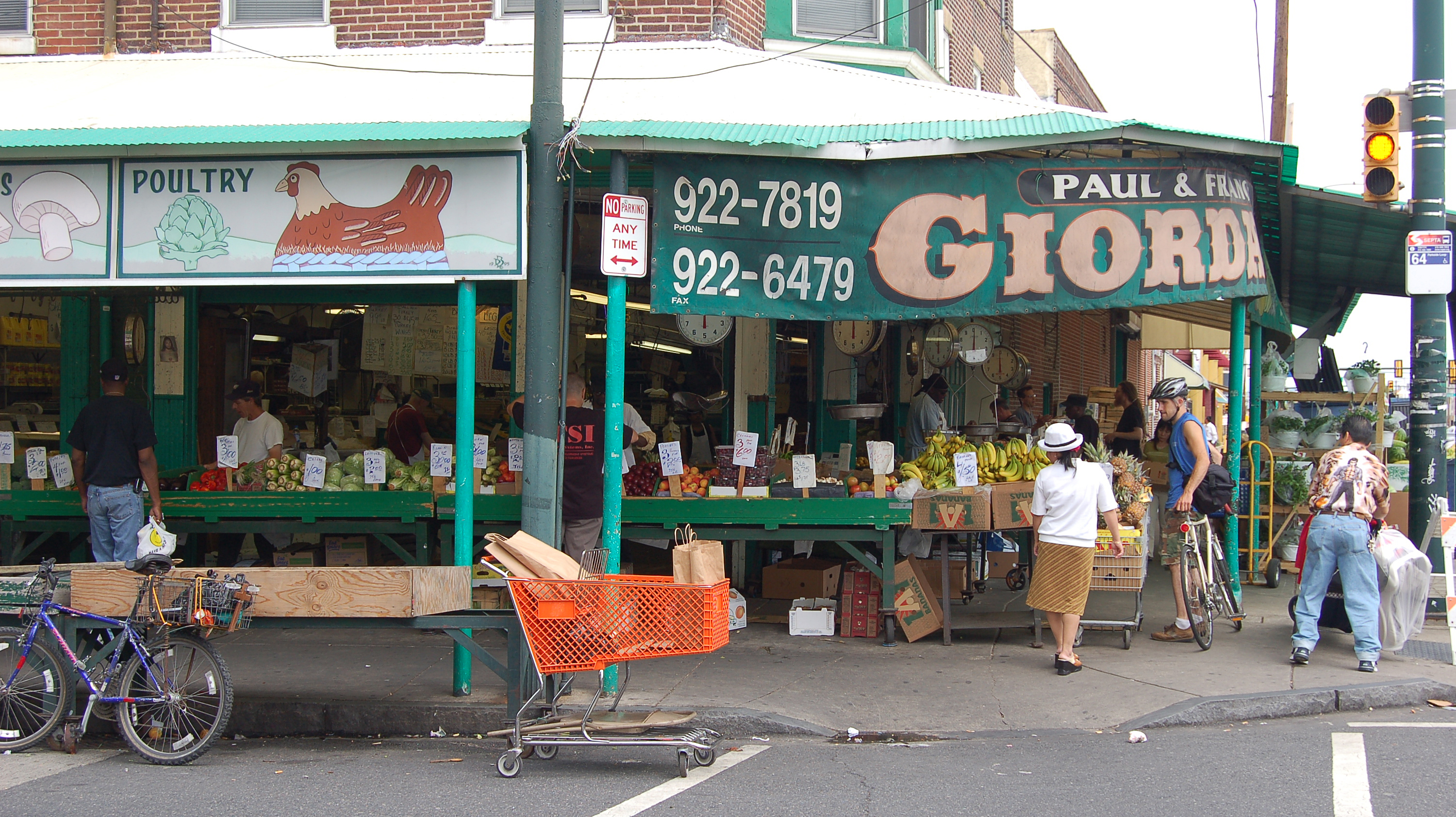
The Italian Market

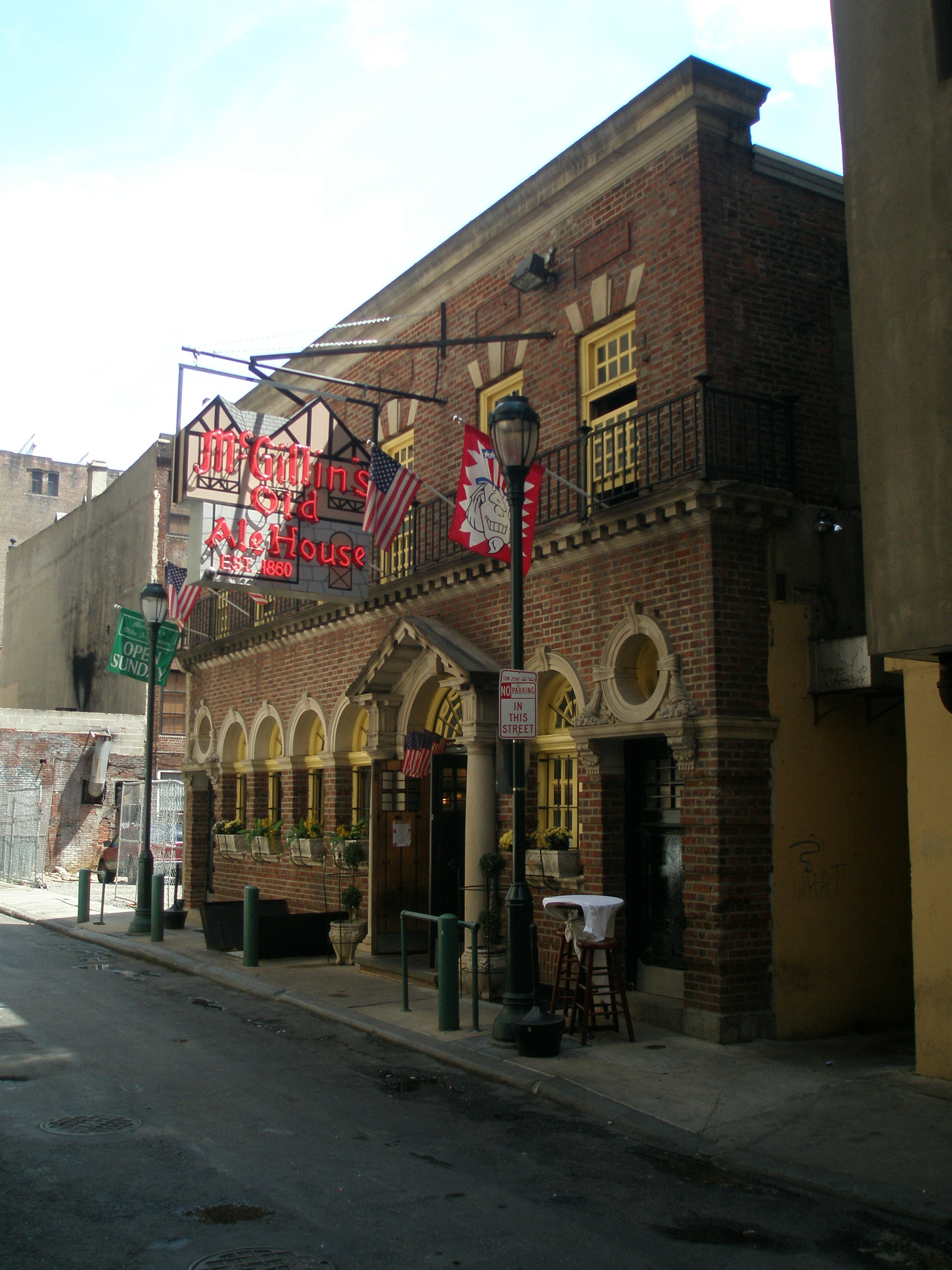
McGillin's Olde Ale House

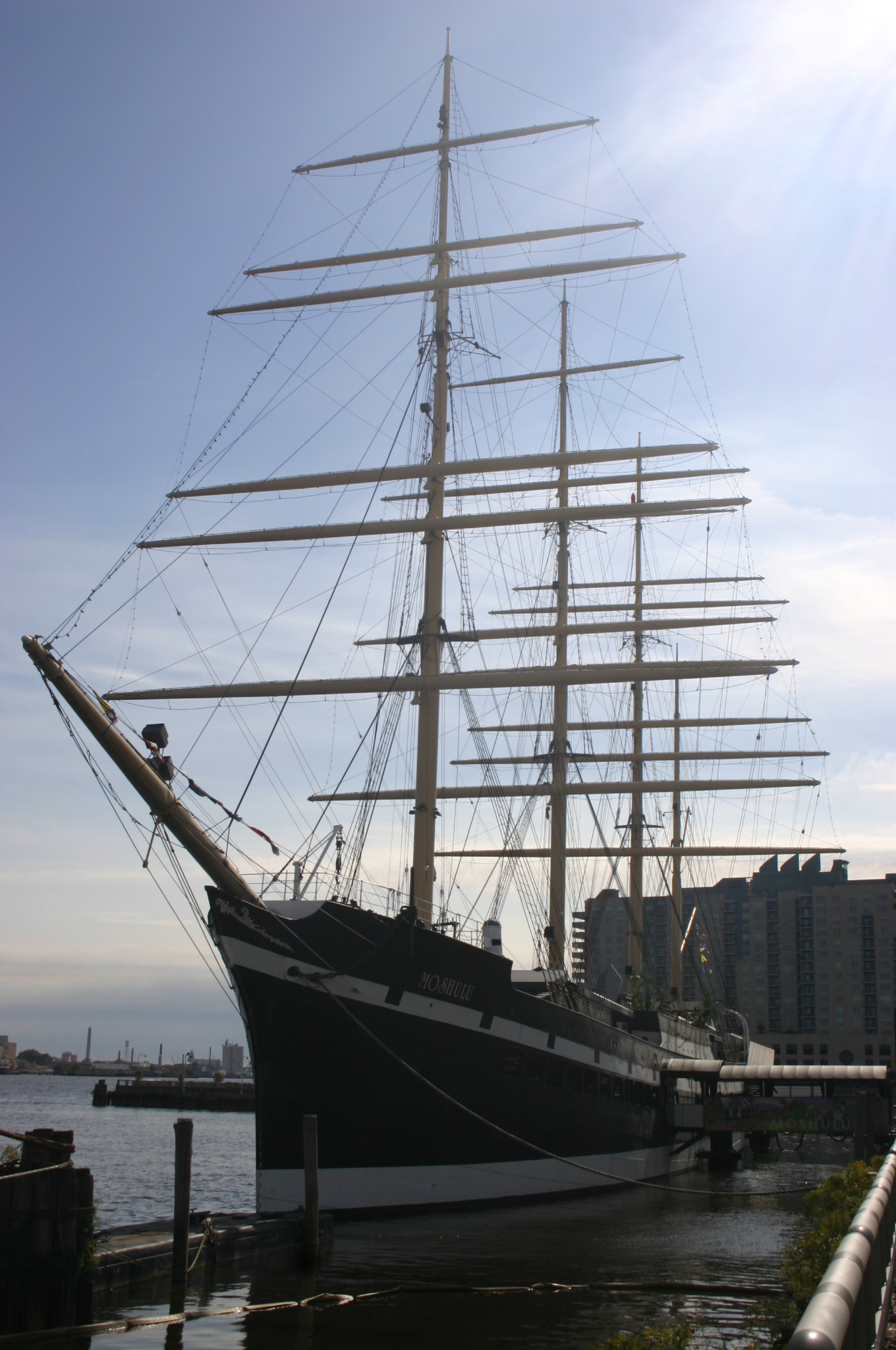
The Moshulu, a floating restaurant

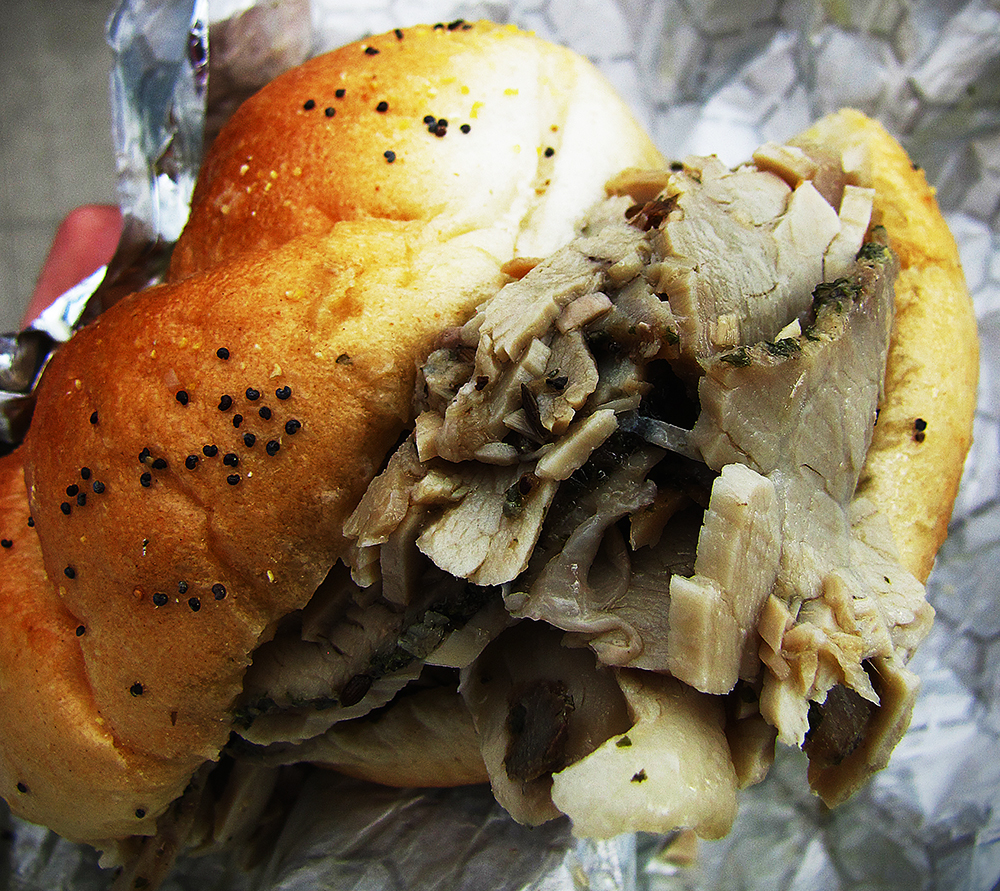
Roast pork sandwich

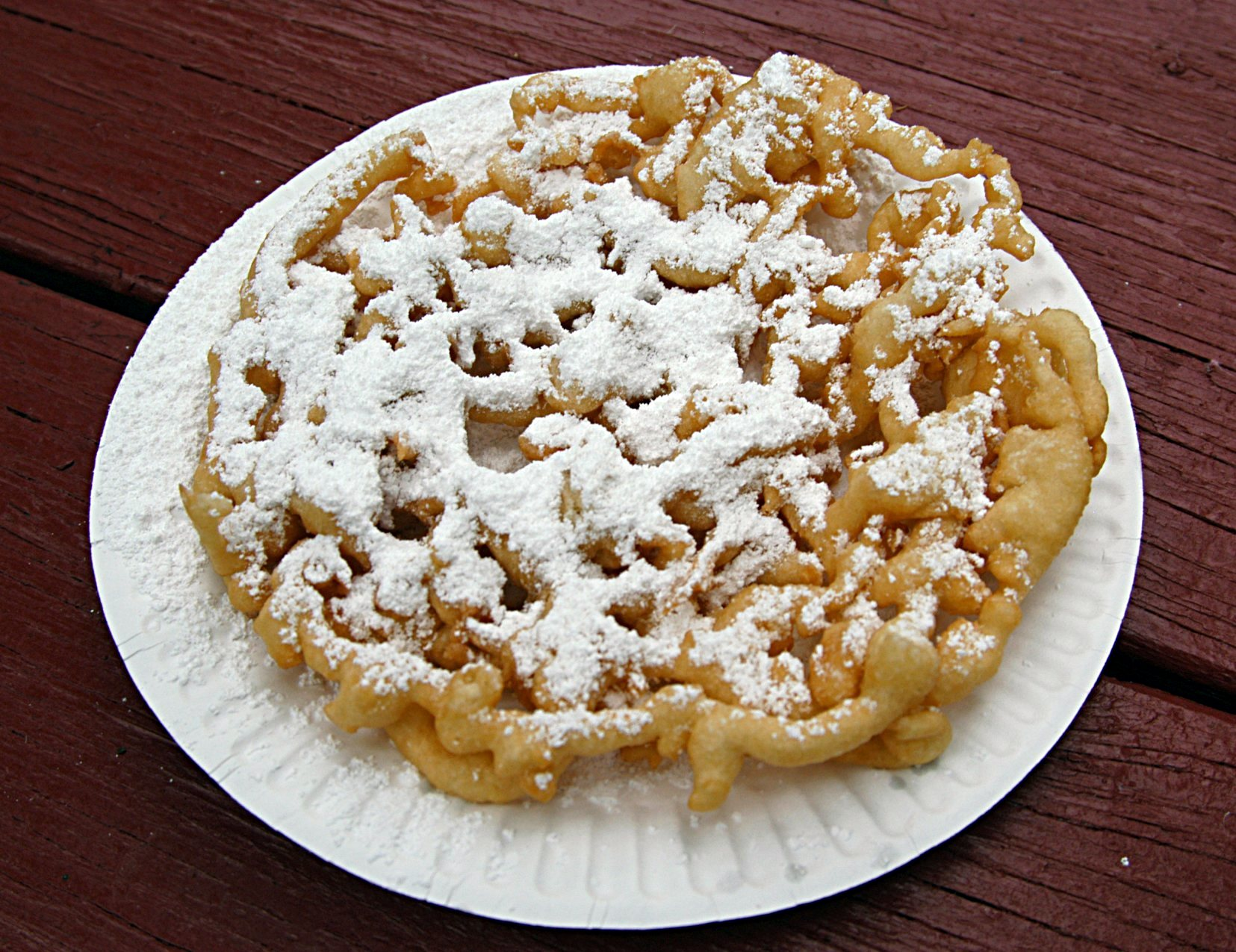
Funnel cake

Philadelphia's large immigrant population has contributed to a large mixture of tastes to mingle and develop. Many types of foods have been created in or near Philadelphia or have strong associations with the city. Food or dishes associated with Philadelphia include cheesesteaks, hoagies, soft pretzels, stromboli, water ice, Italian roast pork and Italian chicken cutlet sandwiches with broccoli rabe and provolone; panzerotti, scrapple, Tastykakes, and tomato pie, among others.

The cheesesteak is a sandwich traditionally made with sliced beef and melted cheese on an Italian roll. In the 1930s, the phenomenon as a steak sandwich began when the South Philly Italian-American brothers Pat Olivieri and Harry Olivieri put grilled beef on a hot dog bun and gave it to a taxi driver. Later, after Pat and Harry had started selling the sandwich on Italian rolls, the cheesesteak was affixed in the local culture when one of their cooks put melted cheese on the sandwich.

Originally, the cheese was melted in a separate container to accommodate their large clientele who followed kosher rules, thereby not mixing dairy and meat. Today, cheese choices in Philadelphia eateries are virtually limited to American, provolone, or Cheez Whiz. The latter is especially popular in those places that prominently carry it.

The hoagie is another sandwich that is said to have been invented in Philadelphia, undoubtedly of origin in Italian-American cuisine. It has been asserted that Italians working at the World War I era shipyard in Philadelphia, known as Hog Island where emergency shipping was produced for the war effort, introduced the sandwich, by putting various sliced meats, cheeses, and lettuce between two slices of Italian bread. This became known as the "Hog Island" sandwich; hence, the "hoagie".

Declared the official sandwich of Philadelphia in 1992, the hoagie is a sandwich made of meat and cheese with lettuce, tomatoes, and onions on an Italian roll.

Another Italian roll sandwich popularized in Philadelphia by Italian immigrants is the roast pork sandwich, a variation of the Italian street food dish known as porchetta. The sandwich consists of sliced roast pork with broccoli rabe or spinach and provolone cheese.

Philadelphia Pepper Pot, a soup of tripe, meat, and vegetables, is claimed to have been created during the American Revolutionary War and named after the home city of its creator.

Snapper soup, a thick brown turtle soup served with sherry, is a Philadelphia delicacy, generally found in area bars and seafood restaurants. In many places, it is served with oyster crackers (such as OTC Crackers, OTC being an abbreviation for "Original Trenton Cracker") and horseradish.

The snack item commonly associated with Philadelphia, but not invented there, is the soft pretzel. The soft pretzel dates back to 7th-century France and was brought over to the Philadelphia area by the Pennsylvania Dutch. Pretzels were sold in Philadelphia by numerous vendors on street corners. Federal Pretzel Baking Company defined the soft pretzel for most Philadelphians during the 1900s by first applying mass production and distribution to a distinctive baked flavored family recipe.

Another snack associated with Philadelphia is Irish potato candy. The candies have a coconut cream inside (generally made from some blend of coconut, confectioner's sugar, vanilla, and cream or cream cheese) and are rolled in cinnamon on the outside, resulting in an appearance reminiscent of small potatoes. The treats are about the size of a large marble and are especially popular around St. Patrick's Day.

Oh Ryan's of Boothwyn, Pennsylvania, claims to be the largest distributor of Irish Potatoes, shipping about 80,000 pounds to major chains and smaller candy stores, mostly in the Philadelphia area.

Water ice, known as Italian ice in other Northeastern US cities, is similarly associated with Philadelphia, and was brought to Philadelphia by Italian immigrants. Water ice likely derives from semi-frozen desserts originating in Italy, specifically granita, and has been described as a "variation on the more broadly-accepted Italian ice." Certain stands like South Philadelphia's Pop's or Italiano's became popular for their "water ice", and Philadelphia water ice was later franchised into new markets with the spread of Rita's Italian Ice.

Philadelphia has its own regional variant of hot dog known as the Texas Tommy, originating right outside Philadelphia in Pottstown, Pennsylvania before spreading throughout the Delaware Valley region and South Jersey. The Texas Tommy hot dog is defined by its use of cheese (usually cheddar cheese) and bacon as toppings.

Some variations of the Texas Tommy use other forms of cheese, replacing the cheddar with the Cheez Whiz found on cheesesteaks. The bacon and cheese are often wrapped around the hot dog, and the hot dog may be cooked using a variety of methods, such as deep frying, barbecuing, or grilling. Condiments such as mustard, ketchup, or relish may be used in addition to the bacon and cheese.

Chili is also sometimes added to the Texas Tommy, making the dish resemble more closely a Texas Wiener or chili dog with bacon and cheese.

Some types of soda that rose to popularity in Philadelphia include Hires Root Beer, Franks Beverages' unique Black Cherry Wishniak or Vanilla Cream, and Levis Champ Cherry.

== Restaurants and markets ==
=== 18th century ===
In early Philadelphia history, the city's eating scene was dominated by taverns. By 1752, Philadelphia had 120 licensed taverns and numerous illegal taverns. The taverns ranged for all types of people and class from illegal grog shops on the waterfront that sailors frequented to the upper class taverns that members of the city government enjoyed. Taverns such as the London Coffee House, the Blue Anchor, Tun Tavern and John Biddle's Indian King were regular meeting places for the political and business leaders of the city. The City Tavern is a replica of a historic 18th-century building located at 138 South 2nd Street and is part of the Independence National Historical Park. The tavern offers authentic 18th-century recipes, served in seven period dining rooms, three wine cellar rooms and an outdoor garden.

McGillin's Olde Ale House, located on Drury Street in Center City, is the oldest continuously operated tavern in the city, and has become a well-known place for celebrity-spotting.

=== 19th century ===
Popular restaurants during the early 19th century included the United States Hotel and Parkinson's on Chestnut Street and Joseph Head Mansion's House on Spruce Street. One of the most significant restaurateurs and caterers at this time was M. Latouche, an expert in French cuisine, whose restaurant offered expensive food and a choice wine.

Toward the end of the 19th century, the large number of Italian immigrants in South Philadelphia led to the creation of the Italian Market. The market, which runs along part of south 9th Street, includes numerous types of food vendors along with other shops.

Another market, the Reading Terminal Market, opened in 1892. Created to replace the markets displaced by the construction of the Reading Terminal on Market Street in Center City, Reading Terminal Market has over 80 merchants and is a popular tourist attraction.

=== 20th century ===
In 1902, Joseph Horn and Frank Hardart opened the first automat in the U.S. at 818 Chestnut Street, now a retail store. The original Automat is now part of the Smithsonian Institution.

In the 1950s and 1960s, the restaurant scene was in decline. The city saw a large emigration into the suburbs, and fine dining could be found mainly in private clubs and dinner parties. But as the city started to rebound in the 1970s, Philadelphia saw a restaurant renaissance. For instance, in 1970 Georges Perrier and Peter Von Starck founded the French restaurant Le Panetiere. After a year, the two split, with Von Starck taking the Panetiere name to a different location. Perrier opened Le Bec-Fin at 13th & Spruce Street, then later at 1523 Walnut Street, which quickly became one of Philadelphia's most renowned restaurants. Another popular example is H.A Winston & Co., which evolved into a chain of restaurants located throughout the region.

The years following saw many new fine dining places open, including Four Seasons' Fountain Restaurant in 1983. Along with the up-scale restaurants, numerous ethnic and fast-food restaurants opened throughout the city.

The 1970s also saw the rise of street vendors. The vendors, building off the well-established tradition of chestnut and pretzel vendors, began selling numerous foods, especially hot dogs, cheesesteaks, and breakfast sandwiches. By taking up sidewalk space and possibly business, the vendors annoyed established stores which eventually led to numerous legal battles over ordinances which placed restrictions on vendors. The issue was surrounded by race and class overtones, but vendors have since become commonplace and even nationally renowned for serving quality food.

A wide variety of eateries now thrive in Philadelphia. The city has a growing reputation for culinary excellence, and many of the city's chefs have been honored with nominations for James Beard Awards.

Prolific local restaurateurs like Stephen Starr's STARR Restaurants and Iron Chef Jose Garces's Garces Restaurant Group operate restaurants that coexist with small chef-owned BYOBs. Major dining locations include Rittenhouse Square, Old City, Chinatown, Manayunk, East Passyunk Avenue and Fishtown.

A variety of cuisines popular with Philadelphians today include Italian, Mediterranean, Chinese, Japanese, steakhouses, French, gastropub fare, tapas, diners, delis, and pizzerias.

=== 21st century ===
In September 2006, a smoking ban went into effect for Philadelphia bars and restaurants. The ban, which exempts private clubs, hotels, specialty smoking shops, and waiver-eligible bars that serve little food, had a troubled start and went unenforced until January 2007.

Just a month later Philadelphia City Council passed a ban on trans fat in restaurants, effective September 2, 2007. Other health reforms have been introduced by the Get Healthy Philly Initiative.

By 2017, ethnic Mexicans in South Philadelphia began selling Mexican pizzas, that is pizzas with Mexican-style toppings and ingredients. This style was developed through Mexican immigrants working in Italian American-style businesses. By 2023 the food expanded into surrounding counties.

== Other foods with Philadelphia historical roots ==
- Cheese sauce—gooey, orange dairy condiment carried by many street vendors. In general, Philadelphians often add cheese sauce to inexpensive food items, such as French fries and pretzels. The vast majority of cheese sauce served on Philadelphia foods is the national brand Cheez Whiz.
- Funnel cake—associated with the Pennsylvania Dutch, made by pouring batter into hot cooking oil in a circular pattern and deep frying the overlapping mass until golden-brown; extremely popular in the Philadelphia area.
- German butter cake—very rich type of pound cake with a buttery, pudding-like center, not to be confused with the traditional butter cake or the St. Louis version. Also called Philadelphia butter cake.
- Good & Plenty—popular licorice pastille candy created in 1893.
- Herr's—Philadelphia-area snack brand, noted for potato chips and other snack foods
- Peanut Chews—popular candy produced in Philadelphia since 1917
- Pork roll—although developed and mostly produced in Trenton (on the border between the Philadelphia and New York spheres of influence) and mostly associated with New Jersey culinary traditions, pork roll is widely available in the Philadelphia area and well-incorporated into Philadelphian cuisine.
- Scrapple—processed meat loaf made of pork scraps and trimmings combined with cornmeal and flour, is a Pennsylvanian breakfast food.
- Soda—in the early 19th century, Dr. Philip Syng Physick and John Hart of Philadelphia invented carbonated water in an attempt to simulate water from natural springs. In 1807, Philadelphian pharmacist Townsend Speakman sold fruit juice and carbonated water, inventing the first soft drink. In 1875, Charles Elmer Hires invented root beer by mixing sarsaparilla, sassafras, wild cherry, wintergreen, ginger, and alcohol. He sold it at his drug store in Philadelphia.
- Whoopie pie—also associated with the Pennsylvania Dutch, it is made of two round mound-shaped pieces of chocolate cake, or sometimes pumpkin or gingerbread cake, with a sweet, creamy filling or frosting sandwiched between them. Also popular in New England.
- Spiced wafers—spice and molasses cookies traditionally sold in the autumn. Ivins and Sweetzels brands sold in iconic orange boxes.
- Stromboli—reported to have originated in 1950 in Essington, just outside Philadelphia. It is a type of turnover made with Italian bread dough filled with various kinds of cheese, Italian charcuterie or vegetables. Panzarotti is a trademark for a type of deep-fried stromboli, particularly associated with Philadelphia's South Jersey suburbs.
- Tastykake—most well-known snack brand native to Philadelphia. Since 1914, the Tasty Baking Company has provided the region with its line of pre-packaged baked goods; best-known varieties include Krimpets, cupcakes, Kandy Kakes (wafer-sized chocolate and peanut butter cakes), and Tasty Pies.
- Tomato pie—essentially a cheeseless pizza two-feet by three-feet in size, with extra oregano. Tomato pie is normally served cold or at room temperature. It is more often found in the Northeast section of Philadelphia and at bakeries in South Philadelphia with variations found in Trenton, New Jersey and other suburban localities.
- Texas Tommy—grilled, split hot dog with bacon and cheese; a common hot dog dish in Philadelphia.
- Water ice—a version of Italian ice that is popular in Philadelphia and the Delaware Valley. It is sold to order at specific shops and pre-packaged in grocery stores.

== Alcoholic beverages ==
Beer was brewed by English colonial inhabitants of Philadelphia since the city's founding in 1682, and later by German immigrants that settled the city's countryside. Because of this, the city is strongly identified with both English-style beer (particularly porter, a variety that was virtually synonymous with Philadelphia during the American Revolutionary period) and German-style beer (such as lager), which eclipsed the English style near the end of the 19th century.

In the industry's heyday before Prohibition, more than 90 breweries operated in city limits, with another 100 located in the greater metropolitan area. A neighborhood in the city is still called Brewerytown, owing to the concentration of breweries in the area during this time. The last of the city's most successful brewers, such as the Henry F. Ortlieb Brewing Company and the Christian Schmidt Brewing Company, shut down in the 1980s.

The beer most associated with Philadelphia is Yuengling lager, brewed in nearby Pottsville, Pennsylvania and often referred to as simply "Lager" by Philadelphians and people in the Delaware Valley and South Jersey.

Recently, however, a number of highly regarded micro-breweries and brewpubs appeared in and around the city in the 1990s and 2000s, such as Victory, Yards and PBC, reviving the city's dormant brewing industry. (For more information, see Breweries in Philadelphia.) In 2011, Philadelphia was ranked as one of the 14 best beer cities in the world by Frommer's, and the city's annual beer week is among its most popular food-centric civic events.

Other notable Delaware Valley microbreweries and brewpubs include Iron Hill Breweries and the award-winning Sly Fox Brewery.

The distillation of spirits in Philadelphia has a long history, but the industry has sat idle for several decades.

One of the largest manufacturing complexes in the city, spanning 40 acres (16 ha), was owned by Publicker Industries, which produced chemicals, industrial alcohols and spirits in South Philadelphia. Its Continental Distilling Company arm produced Old Hickory bourbon, Inver House Scotch and Skol vodka, among many other liquors, before the company abandoned the site in 1986.

The oldest producer of cordials and liqueurs in the U.S., Charles Jacquin et Cie, remains in operation in the city's Kensington neighborhood; the company is best known for its Pravda vodka, Jacquin's family of liqueurs and Original Bartenders Cocktails brand, well as its introduction of Chambord (sold to Brown-Forman in 2006), Creme Yvette, St-Germain and Domaine de Canton to the U.S. market.

More recently, Philadelphia Distilling opened in 2005 in the city's Fishtown neighborhood; it is the first craft distillery to open in Pennsylvania since before Prohibition, and produces Bluecoat American Dry Gin, Vieux Carré Absinthe Supérieure, Penn 1681 vodka, XXX Shine corn whiskey and The Bay, a vodka seasoned with Chesapeake Bay seasoning.

== See also ==
- Cuisine of Allentown, Pennsylvania
- Cuisine of New Jersey
- Cuisine of the Pennsylvania Dutch
- Cuisine of the Thirteen Colonies
