= Forbidden fruit (disambiguation) =

Forbidden fruit is a phrase that originates from the Book of Genesis concerning Adam and Eve.

Forbidden fruit may also refer to:

== Commercial product ==
- Forbidden Fruit (beer), a beer brewed by Hoegaarden Brewery in Flanders, Belgium
- Forbidden Fruit (liqueur), a liqueur, with pomelo as one of the ingredients
- An internet meme for the consumption of Tide Pods

== Music ==
=== Albums ===
- Forbidden Fruit (Elegy album), or the title song
- Forbidden Fruit (Marion Meadows album), or the title song
- Forbidden Fruit (Nina Simone album), or the title song
- Fruto Proibido, a Brazilian album by Rita Lee that translates to Forbidden Fruit, or the title song

=== Songs ===
- "Forbidden Fruit" (J. Cole song), featuring Kendrick Lamar
- "Forbidden Fruit" (Noël Coward song)
- "Forbidden Fruit", a song by The Band from their album Northern Lights – Southern Cross
- "Forbidden Fruit", a song by The Blow Monkeys from their album Animal Magic
- "Forbidden Fruit", a song by Jessica Simpson from her album In This Skin
- "Forbidden Fruit", a song by Paul van Dyk from his album Seven Ways
- "Forbidden Fruit", a song by The Pursuit of Happiness from their album One Sided Story
- "Forbidden Fruit", a song by Roy Harper from his album Valentine
- "Forbidden Fruit", a song by Toya Delazy from her album Ascension
- "Forbidden Fruit", a song by Leigh-Anne from her EP No Hard Feelings

== Film ==
- Forbidden Fruit, a 1915 film directed by Ivan Abramson
- Forbidden Fruit (1921 film), directed by Cecil B. DeMille
- Forbidden Fruit (1952 film), directed by Henri Verneuil
- Forbidden Fruit (1953 film), a Mexican drama film
- Forbidden Fruit (2000 film), directed by Sue Maluwa-Bruce, Beate Kunath and Yvonne Zückmantel
- Forbidden Fruit (2009 film), directed by Dome Karukoski
- Heart of Men, reissued as Forbidden Fruit, directed by Frank Rajah Arase
- Forbidden Fruits, a 2026 film directed by Meredith Alloway

== Television ==
- "Forbidden Fruit" (American Horror Story)
- "Forbidden Fruit" (CSI: NY episode)
- "Forbidden Fruit" (Dead Zone)
- "Forbidden Fruit" (Duckman)
- "Forbidden Fruit" (Will & Grace)
- The Forbidden Fruit, an Iranian drama
- Yasak Elma, a Turkish romance/drama that translates to Forbidden Fruit

== Literature ==
- Forbidden Fruit: Selected Tales in Verse, Guido Walman's 1998 translation of selections from Jean de La Fontaine's Contes et nouvelles en vers (1665)
- Forbidden Fruit, a 1992 anthology of erotica written by Filipina women
- Forbidden Fruit, a 1954 science fiction novella by Edwin Charles Tubb
- Forbidden Fruit, a 1996 romantic thriller novel by Erica Spindler
- Forbidden Fruit (novel), a 2009 crime novel by Kerry Greenwood

== Fruit ==
- Forbidden fruit (citrus), a citrus fruit variety native to Saint Lucia
