= Green ginger wine =

Green ginger wine may refer to:

- Ginger wine, often sold in green bottles, sometimes with "Green" on the label
- "Green Ginger Wine", a song by the Rumjacks
