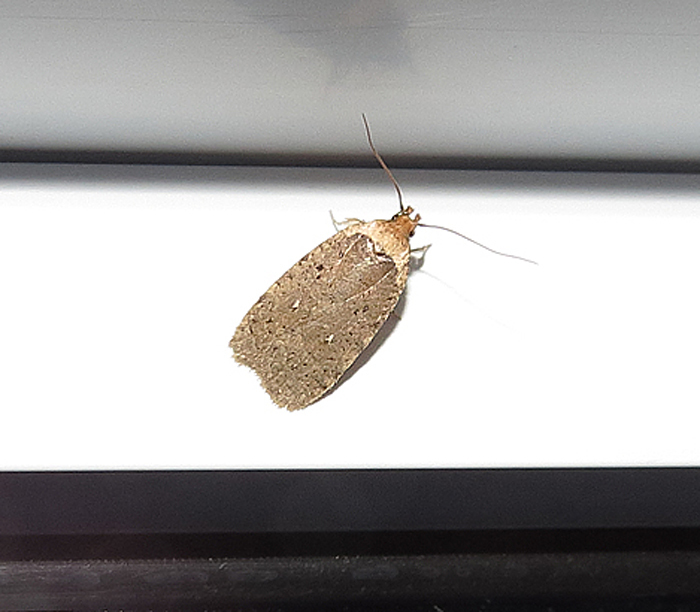

Scientific classification
- Kingdom: Animalia
- Phylum: Arthropoda
- Clade: Pancrustacea
- Class: Insecta
- Order: Lepidoptera
- Family: Depressariidae
- Genus: Agonopterix
- Species: A. nigrinotella

Binomial name
- Agonopterix nigrinotella (Busck, 1908)

Synonyms
- Depressaria nigrinotella Busck, 1908

= Agonopterix nigrinotella =

Species of moth

Agonopterix nigrinotella is a moth in the family Depressariidae. It was described by August Busck in 1908. It is found in North America, where it has been recorded from Arkansas, Illinois, Indiana, Maine, Maryland, Michigan, Minnesota, New York, Ohio, Ontario, Quebec and Wisconsin.

The wingspan is 20–23 mm. The forewings are brownish fuscous faintly, irrorated with blackish fuscous. There is a blackish-fuscous shade beyond the light basal part of the wing, which fades rapidly into the lighter ground colour. There is a black discal dot at the basal third in the cell, followed at the end of the cell by a yellowish-white discal spot. The hindwings are shining light yellowish fuscous.

The larvae feed on Zanthoxylum americanum.
