= Dichomeris citrifoliella =

Orange webworm moth

Scientific classification
- Kingdom: Animalia
- Phylum: Arthropoda
- Class: Insecta
- Order: Lepidoptera
- Family: Gelechiidae
- Genus: Dichomeris
- Species: D. citrifoliella

Binomial name
- Dichomeris citrifoliella (Chambers, 1880)

Synonyms
- Nothris citrifoliella Chambers, 1880

Species of moth

Dichomeris citrifoliella, the orange webworm moth, is a moth in the family Gelechiidae. It was described by Vactor Tousey Chambers in 1880. It is found in North America, where it has been recorded from Michigan and Wisconsin to Florida and Texas.

The wingspan is about 18 mm. The forewings are ochreous yellow, densely and evenly dusted with gray and with two antemedial dark dots above and below the fold. There are two dots in the cell and one dot in the fold just beyond them, as well as a pair of blackish discal dots and a stronger blackish shade on the inner margin beyond them. The postmedial line is faint, pale, defined with dark and irregular. The hindwings are grayer. Adults are on wing from April to September.

The larvae feed on the buds of Citrus species, Zanthoxylum americanum and Ptelea trifoliata.
