= Sweet Revenge (liqueur) =

Strawberry and Citrus Flavored Liqueur

- 750 mL bottle of Sweet Revenge. The bottle shape resembles a vintage American whiskey bottle
- Type: Whiskey Liqueur
- Manufacturer: Independence Spirits Company, LLC
- Distributor: Independence Spirits Company, LLC
- Origin: United States
- Introduced: 2012
- Alcohol by volume: 35.5%
- Proof (US): 71
- Color: Pink
- Flavor: Strawberry and citrus
- Related products: Domaine de Canton
- Website: www.sweet-revenge.com

Sweet Revenge is a 77-proof (38.5% alcohol by volume) liqueur (Note: A liquor, also known in the UK and elsewhere simply as a spirit, is a distilled beverage such as whiskey, gin, vodka or brandy. A liqueur is a spirit-based or liquor-based blend to which fruits, herbs or other sweet or savory flavors have been added, often by means of infused syrups. In the US "cordial" is synonymous with liqueur.) with natural flavorings that include wild strawberry and citrus, according to the manufacturer's website, literature and public trademark documents. It is essentially a blended sour mash whiskey flavored with fruit syrup(s). The liqueur has a vivid semi-translucent pink color and a sweet, assertive strawberry-dominant flavor. Sweet Revenge is marketed in a 750 mL size bottle with a silhouette similar to that of vintage American whiskey brands. It is promoted as a shot beverage with relatively high alcohol content – the liqueur is typically served undiluted in a shot glass or on the rocks (in a glass over ice).

Sweet Revenge is manufactured by Independence Spirits Company, LLC at the Charles Jacquin et Cie, Inc. facility in Philadelphia, Pennsylvania. It was developed and is marketed by John Cooper, of Independence Spirits Company, LLC, of Miami, Florida, who was also the producer of Domaine de Canton, another flavored liqueur that was previously produced by Jacquin, and was distributed by Miami-based Maurice Cooper et Cie, LLC. Sweet Revenge was introduced to the marketplace in the US in early 2012.

== Sour mash ==
The Sweet Revenge package label and marketing materials refer to "sour mash". In the sour mash production process, a portion of the mash is saved after fermentation and used as the fermentation starter for the next batch, similar to the use of a portion of a previous batch of dough when making sourdough bread. The sour mash addition regulates bacteria growth and helps to maintain a proper pH level, which contribute to yeast development and flavor consistency from batch-to-batch. In the phrase sour mash, the term "sour" is a colloquialism for fermented and does not indicate that the resulting product would have a sour taste.
