= Forbidden Fruit (liqueur) =

Grapefruit liqueur of 1800s

- Type: Liqueur
- Manufacturer: Charles Jacquin et Cie
- Introduced: 1890s
- Discontinued: 1970s
- Proof (US): 55.8-80
- Ingredients: Grapefruit

Forbidden Fruit was a 27.9-40% ABV grapefruit liqueur first created in the late 1800s and manufactured by Charles Jacquin et Cie. It was significant in pre-Prohibition cocktail recipes and continued being used frequently after the repeal of Prohibition in the United States. It ceased production in the late 1970s as its classic spherical bottle design was used for the then new Chambord.

== History ==
Originally referred to as "the forbidden fruit" upon its first description by Reverend Griffith Hughes in 1750, the grapefruit was still considered a novel citrus in the United States through much of the 19th century. The grapefruit was originally imported to Florida by Count Odet Philippe in 1823, and only began to be shipped up the east coast to New York and Philadelphia in 1885. This made the introduction of Forbidden Fruit liqueur in the 1890s a very innovative move.

Forbidden Fruit was created by Louis Bustanoby of the well-known Café des Beaux-Arts. Prior to the commercial release of the liqueur, Bustanoby would make the liqueur as an individual drink utilizing the skin of a grapefruit, sugar, and fired brandy. Though it is not entirely clear what made up the commercially available liqueur, it is generally accepted that it was composed of grapefruit or pomelo, grape brandy, and honey. The final incarnation of the liqueur had a different formula based on apple-flavored syrup, and was not sold in the iconic spherical bottle.

== Bottle ==
The bottle design for Forbidden Fruit was originally patented by Louis Bustanoby's brother André on February 2, 1904. Referred to as a "Bustanoby Bottle," its design was modeled after a globus cruciger, which is fitting considering the religious overtones evoked by the name Forbidden Fruit. The design was a spherical bottle with the name of the liqueur wrapped around the midsection on a belt and featured a crown on the stopper.

This bottle design was later repurposed after the discontinuation of Forbidden Fruit by manufacturer Charles Jacquin et Cie for its new liqueur, Chambord.

== Cocktails ==
Many cocktails in the early 20th century utilized Forbidden Fruit as an ingredient. It is frequently mentioned in the Savoy Cocktail Book and the Cafe Royal Cocktail Book in recipes such as the Virgin Cocktail and the Tantalus Cocktail.

It is described in some detail in The Fine Art of Mixing Drinks by David A. Embury. Though he describes it as "decidedly inferior" to other citrus liqueurs such as Grand Marnier and Cointreau, he also offers some cocktail recipes including the liqueur such as the Adam & Eve Cocktail and the Lover's Delight Cocktail.

== Attempts to reproduce ==
Due to its usage in several classic cocktail manuals, many attempts have been made by both professionals and amateurs to reproduce the original proprietary formula. Currently, the only commercially available reproduction is provided by Lee Spirits Company of Colorado.
