= Philadelphia Distilling =

- Location: Philadelphia, Pennsylvania
- Founded: March 2005
- Founder: Robert Cassell, Andrew Auwerda, Timothy Yarnall
- Status: Active
- Website: www.philadelphiadistilling.com

Philadelphia Distilling is a microdistillery founded in March 2005 in the Byberry neighborhood of Philadelphia, Pennsylvania. It is the first craft distillery to open in Pennsylvania since before Prohibition.

== History ==
Robert Cassell got the idea to begin distilling in 2003, while working as director of quality assurance at Victory Brewing Company in Downingtown, Pennsylvania. During his time there, he took courses on distilling from Heriot-Watt University in Edinburgh, Scotland. In 2005, he partnered with his uncle, Andrew Auwerda, and a former Bloomberg LP sales manager, Timothy Yarnall, to launch Philadelphia Distilling in a facility located in an industrial office park in Northeast Philadelphia.

When Cassell first attempted to apply for a Pennsylvania distillery license, Pennsylvania Liquor Control Board officials had to create an application form for him, because none existed.

By 2011, the company ranked in the top 10 of 300 smaller distilleries operating nationwide, and shipped nearly 120,000 bottles of gin.

The distillery moved from its Northeast Philadelphia location to a 15,000 square foot attraction off of Frankford Avenue in the city's Fishtown neighborhood. The new distillery features two copper stills and four, 800-gallon wood fermenters. The building features a bottle shop, cocktail bar and four floors up, a private event space.

In 2022, Heaven Hill acquired Philadelphia Distilling and five other spirits brands by purchasing Samson & Surrey, which had previously acquired Philadelphia Distilling.

== Facility ==
The company uses a hand-hammered copper still from A. Forsythe & Son, of Rothes, Scotland.

== Advocacy ==
In September 2011, Cassell gave testimony to the Pennsylvania Senate Law and Justice Committee arguing for reform of Pennsylvania's 1951 liquor code, which bans craft distilleries from selling their products on-site, unlike wineries and breweries that also operate in the state. He has also advocated for lower federal excise taxes on small distilleries.

== Products ==
The company has seven core spirits. Bluecoat American Dry Gin, introduced in 2006, is an "American-style" gin that emphasizes citrus over juniper berries. As of 2011, this gin was being sold in 37 U.S. states. Penn 1681 Rye Vodka was introduced in 2008; unlike typical vodkas made from potatoes or wheat, it is made from rye grown in Pennsylvania. Vieux Carré Absinthe Supérieure was introduced in 2009. According to the company, it was the first absinthe to be legally distilled, bottled and sold on the U.S. east coast in nearly a century. The Bay, introduced in 2013, is a vodka seasoned with Chesapeake Bay seasoning. Bluecoat Barrel-Finished Gin was first introduced in 2014 as a “gin for whiskey drinkers” and is aged in new American oak barrels for eight months. In May of 2019, Philadelphia Distilling released its Bluecoat Elderflower Gin. The gin starts with a foundation of the flagship Bluecoat American Dry Gin and then whole organic elderflowers are macerated into the gin to add floral notes and tropical flavors into the gin.

XXX Shine corn whiskey was introduced in 2011, as a family of high-proof white whiskeys in the style of moonshine. In addition to the original, this group includes Salted Caramel and LiberTea (black tea, lemon, honey) versions of the whiskey. These products were later discontinued.

In 2012, the company produced bitters called Bartram's Bitters, recreating a recipe for "Bartram's Homestead Bitters" that was found in a book that belonged to the family of 18th-century botanist John Bartram. The botanicals used in the making bitters include prickly ash bark from a tree in Bartram's Garden in Philadelphia.

The company also produces Vigo Amaro, an Italian-style amaro flavored with various botanicals and sweetened with muscovado sugar. It is named for Francis Vigo, an Italian-born financier who supported the American Revolution.

== Awards ==
The company's Bluecoat American Dry Gin won a double Gold Medal for Best Gin at the 2009 San Francisco World Spirits Competition. It also won a Gold Medal and the Best In Class award for Best Gin at the 2007 International Wine & Spirits Competition.

== See also ==
- Cuisine of Philadelphia
