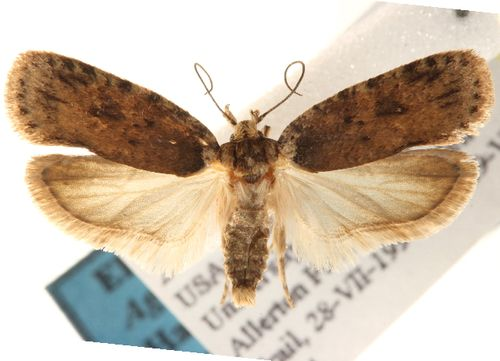

Scientific classification
- Kingdom: Animalia
- Phylum: Arthropoda
- Clade: Pancrustacea
- Class: Insecta
- Order: Lepidoptera
- Family: Depressariidae
- Genus: Agonopterix
- Species: A. paulae

Binomial name
- Agonopterix paulae Harrison, 2005

= Agonopterix paulae =

Species of moth

Agonopterix paulae is a moth in the family Depressariidae. It was described by T. L. Harrison in 2005. It is found in the United States, where it has been recorded from Illinois, Michigan, Minnesota, Ohio and Wisconsin.

== Description ==
The length of the forewings is 10–10.5 millimetres (0.39–0.41 in). The forewings are medium ochreous brown with a small, blackish-brown patch at the base of the costa. The rest of the wing base is ochreous. There is a small, blackish-brown spot on the fold and a second similar spot almost directly anterior to it. A third such spot is located anterior and basal to the second. There are six or seven blackish-brown marks on the costa. The hindwings are shining pale ochreous, finely scaled with brown at the outer margin.

== Diet ==
The larvae feed on Zanthoxylum americanum.

== Etymology ==
The species is named in honor of Paula D. Harrison, wife of the author.
