= Whisky Mac =

Cocktail with whisky and ginger wine

A Whisky Macdonald, more commonly known under the shortened name Whisky Mac, is a cocktail made up of whisky and ginger wine. The whisky is expected to be a Scotch whisky, usually a blended type. The ginger wine should be green ginger wine. Recipes vary from those having equal parts of each ingredient to those that use a ratio of 3 to 2 of whisky to wine.

A common recipe is to take 45 millilitres (1 1/2 imperial fluid ounces) Scotch whisky and 45 mL (1 1/2 imp fl oz) green ginger wine. Pour both of the ingredients into a wine goblet with no ice. A hot version can also be made, akin to a hot toddy, made with the addition of boiling water.

The invention of it, and its name, is attributed to Colonel Hector MacDonald, who devised it during the days of the British Raj in India. The mixed drink is sometimes referred to as "The Golfers' Favourite". Apparently, golfers drank whisky macs to ward off the cold after a chilly round on the links.

== See also ==
- List of cocktails
