= French martini =

Vodka-based cocktail

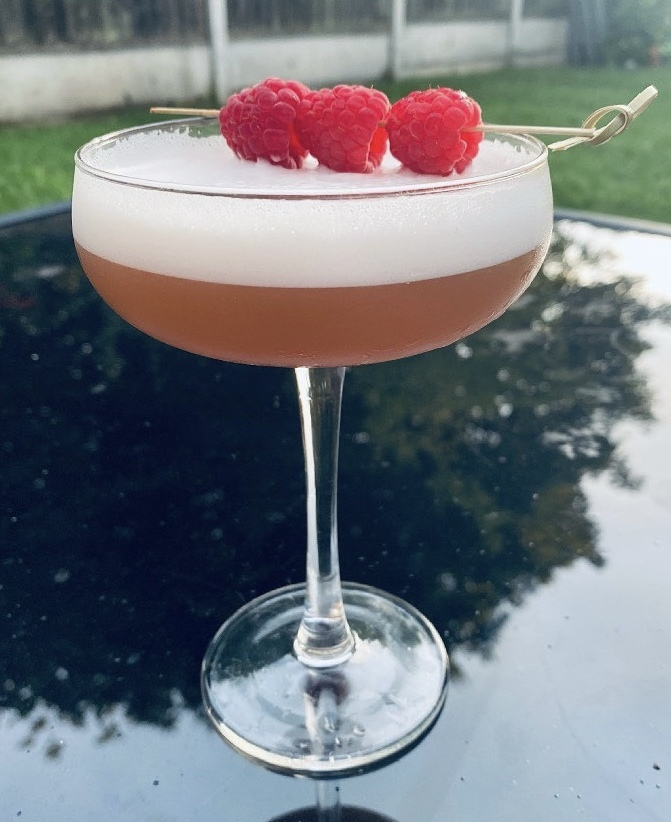
- Type: Cocktail
- Ingredients: 45 ml vodka; 15 ml raspberry liqueur; 15 ml fresh pineapple juice
- Base spirit: Vodka, raspberry liqueur
- Standard drinkware: Cocktail glass
- Standard garnish: Squeeze oil from lemon peel onto the drink.
- Served: Straight up: chilled, without ice
- Preparation: Pour all ingredients into cocktail shaker, shake well with ice, strain into chilled cocktail glass.

The French martini is a vodka-based cocktail. It was invented in the 1980s at one of Keith McNally's New York City bars. It next appeared on the drinks menu at McNally's Balthazar in SoHo in 1996. The cocktail was produced during the 1980s–1990s cocktail renaissance.

It is not a true martini, but is one of many drinks that incorporate the term martini into their names. The key ingredient that makes a martini "French" is Chambord, a black raspberry liqueur based on recipes that have been produced in France since 1685.

== See also ==
- List of cocktails
