= Forbidden Fruit (Noël Coward song) =

Song composed by Noël Coward

"Forbidden Fruit", also known as "It's The Peach", is an early Noël Coward song written in 1915, but not publicly performed until 1924 and not published until 1953. Although another early song, "Peter Pan" was the first to be recorded, in 1918, Coward considered "Forbidden Fruit" to be his first full-length song, already exhibiting Coward's trademark "worldly cynicism", risque lyrics, and "love of the internal rhyme." Musical theatre writer Stephen Citron concluded that the song's "musical rhythms, phrase lengths and especially its melodic sophistication are all harbingers of a more mature Coward."

In Present Indicative, Coward's first autobiography, he describes his song as "a bright 'Point' number: 'Forbidden Fruit,' which I think is worthy of record as it was the first complete lyric I ever wrote." In musical theatre a "point" number is a song requiring a heightened accentuation on particular words that will "point" them out as important to the sense of the song. "Forbidden Fruit" came so easily to Coward that from that time on he increasingly focussed on song writing.

== Lyrics ==
The song "Forbidden Fruit" begins with the line "Ordinary man, Invariably sighs", describing a man in a peach orchard. The song became known as the "Peach" song due to this and the refrain:

Every peach out of reach is attractive 'Cause it's just a little bit too high. And you'll find that every man. Will try to pluck it, if he can. As he passes by.

Regarding the lyric "And I'll bet you half a crown, He'll appreciate the flavor of it much much more" Coward, later reviewing the song in his autobiography, noted that "a bet of fifty pounds or at least a fiver would be more in keeping with the urbanity of the song.

== In film ==
The song features in the film biography of Coward. Originally "Forbidden Fruit" was the song the 18-year-old Coward played in his audition for André Charlot, following an introduction by Beatrice Lillie, then a young revue actress from Toronto. Charlot listened silently while Coward played the song in his office, then after Coward left, he berated Lillie for wasting his time with a mediocre talent – a verdict he later revised. This audition was reenacted in Robert Wise's 1968 film Star! where Coward was played by his own godson Daniel Massey. Massey's performance of "Forbidden Fruit" was issued on the soundtrack, making the song commercially available on record for the first time.
