= Chambord (liqueur) =

French raspberry liqueur

- Current owner: Brown Forman
- Introduced: 1982; 44 years ago
- Markets: Worldwide
- Website: www.chambordchannel.com

Chambord (French: [ʃɑ̃bɔʁ]) is a 16.5% abv raspberry liqueur modelled after a liqueur produced in the Loire Valley of France during the late 17th century. The Chambord product brand has been owned and produced by the Brown-Forman Corporation since 2006.

Chambord is made from red and black raspberries, Madagascar vanilla, Moroccan citrus peel, honey and XO cognac.

== History ==
The Chambord brand was developed in 1982 by Norton "Sky" Cooper at his family's cordial company, Charles Jacquin et Cie (later his son, Robert Cooper, would develop the elderflower liqueur, St-Germain). The drink was inspired by raspberry liqueur made in the Loire Valley in the late 1600s, said to have been introduced to Louis XIV during one of his visits to the château de Chambord. At the time, it was common to consume liqueurs and cognac with elegant meals.

In 2006, the Chambord product brand was acquired by the Brown-Forman Corporation.

== Production ==
Chambord is produced in the Loire Valley from raspberries and blackberries, Madagascar vanilla, Moroccan citrus peel, honey and cognac. Whole raspberries and blackberries are steeped in French spirits for several weeks to produce a fruit infusion.

After the infusion is extracted, a second set of spirits is added to the fruit and allowed to rest for a few weeks. After this second infusion is drawn off, the remaining fruit is pressed to obtain the natural sugars and juice. The fruit-infused spirits and juices from the final pressing are combined, and the berry infusion is then combined with a proprietary blend of cognac, natural vanilla extract, black raspberries, citrus peel, honey, and herbs and spices. The liqueur is 16.5% alcohol by volume.

== Bottle ==
Chambord comes in a spherical bottle. Until mid-2010, the bottle had a metallic gold plastic lettered 'belt' around the middle and a crown atop its lid. The bottle was modeled after a globus cruciger.

In the U.S. market, the manufacturer began using a different bottle design in the summer of 2010, with modifications to the belt, lid, and other elements.

In addition to redesigning the bottle for the traditional Chambord liqueur, the manufacturer has also begun using the Chambord brand name on a flavored vodka.

== Cocktails ==
Common drinks made from Chambord include the raspberry margarita, French manhattan, Kir Impérial (Chambord and champagne), Chambord Daiquiri, Chambord royal spritzer, and the French martini. The French martini started the "cocktails as a martini" craze.

== Awards ==
Since 2007, Chambord has earned silver and bronze medals from the San Francisco World Spirits Competition. Other spirit ratings organizations have also rated Chambord relatively highly. Based on Chambord's reviews from various professional raters, Proof66 has categorized Chambord as a "First Tier" liqueur.
