= H.A. Winston & Co. =

Restaurant

- Industry: Restaurant
- Founded: 1972
- Founder: Allen, Herb and Joseph Spivak
- Defunct: 1992
- Area served: Philadelphia, Pennsylvania

H.A. Winston & Co., a.k.a. Winstons was a chain of restaurants centered in the Philadelphia, Pennsylvania, area in the 1970s and 1980s. The chain shut its last restaurant on July 14, 1992.

== History ==
The first H.A. Winston & Co. restaurant opened in 1972 at Front and Chestnut Streets in Philadelphia. Initially, the restaurant was considered a singles bar that incidentally purveyed hamburgers and onion soup, but the chain soon grew popular as a casual dining establishment with restaurants in Pennsylvania, New Jersey, Delaware, and Virginia.

== Company ==
The chain was owned by the Spivak brothers. The "H" in "H.A. Winston & Co." represents co-owner Herb Spivak, and the "A" for Allen Spivak; the story behind the name missing the third brother and co-owner Joseph “Jerry” Spivak is not documented. The brothers were also founders and principals of the Philadelphia-based concert promoter and power-house firm Electric Factory Concerts. Spencer Zahn designed their logo, as well as the burger advertisement shown below.

== Products and services ==
Promotional poster for HAW GourmetBerger

=== Gourmet Burgers ===
Quickly, H.A. Winston & Co. became famous for its 7- and 10-ounce hamburgers, collectively referred to as "GourmetBerger" whose numerous options for topping were referred to and ordered by either its topping number or name.

Toppings:

1. Winston- sauteed onions, peppers & mushrooms
2. American-American cheese, bacon, lettuce & tomato
3. Italian-mozzarella & marinara sauce
4. Society Hill- blue cheese & chives
5. Mexican-chili & chopped onions
6. Russian-sour cream & caviar
