= St-Germain (liqueur) =

Elderflower liqueur

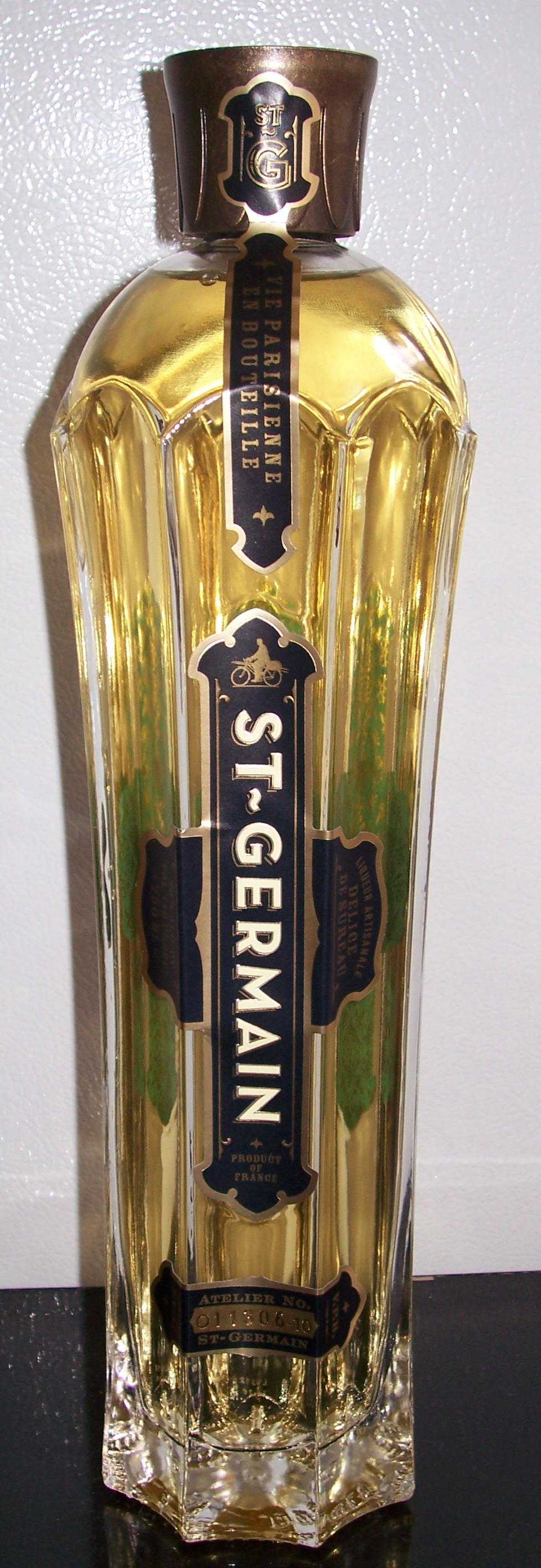
St-Germain Elderflower liqueur

St-Germain is an elderflower liqueur. It is made using the petals of Sambucus nigra from the Savoie region in France, and each bottle is numbered with the year the petals were collected. Petals are collected annually in the spring over a period of three to four weeks, and are often transported by bicycle to collection points to avoid damaging the petals and thus affecting the flavour.

== History ==
St-Germain was created by distiller Robert Cooper, son of the owner of Charles Jacquin et Cie, Norton Cooper, after trying an elderflower-based cocktail at a London bar in 2001. The brand was named after the Paris neighbourhood, Saint-Germain-des-Prés. St-Germain was launched in 2007 by Cooper Spirits Co, a company founded in 2006 and headquartered in New York. In 2013, the company was sold to Bacardi, and Robert Cooper agreed to work with Bacardi as a "brand guardian" and spokesperson. In 2016, Robert Cooper died at the age of 39.

St-Germain introduced a two part online video series, 'Salon St-Germain', based on the historic French salon, in 2020. A second iteration, Fleuriste St-Germain, opened in New York City in August 2021, in collaboration with ballet dancer James Whiteside and director Laura Kim.

== Press and awards ==
The spirit won a Grand Gold Medal at the Monde Selection in 2007, 2008, 2009, 2010, and 2012 and the "Chairman's Award" in the Liqueur category at the Ultimate Spirits Challenge in 2010.
