= Forbidden fruit (citrus) =

Citrus fruit and plant

The forbidden fruit (also shaddette) is a variety of citrus fruit native to Saint Lucia and once thought to be the origin of the grapefruit.

== History ==
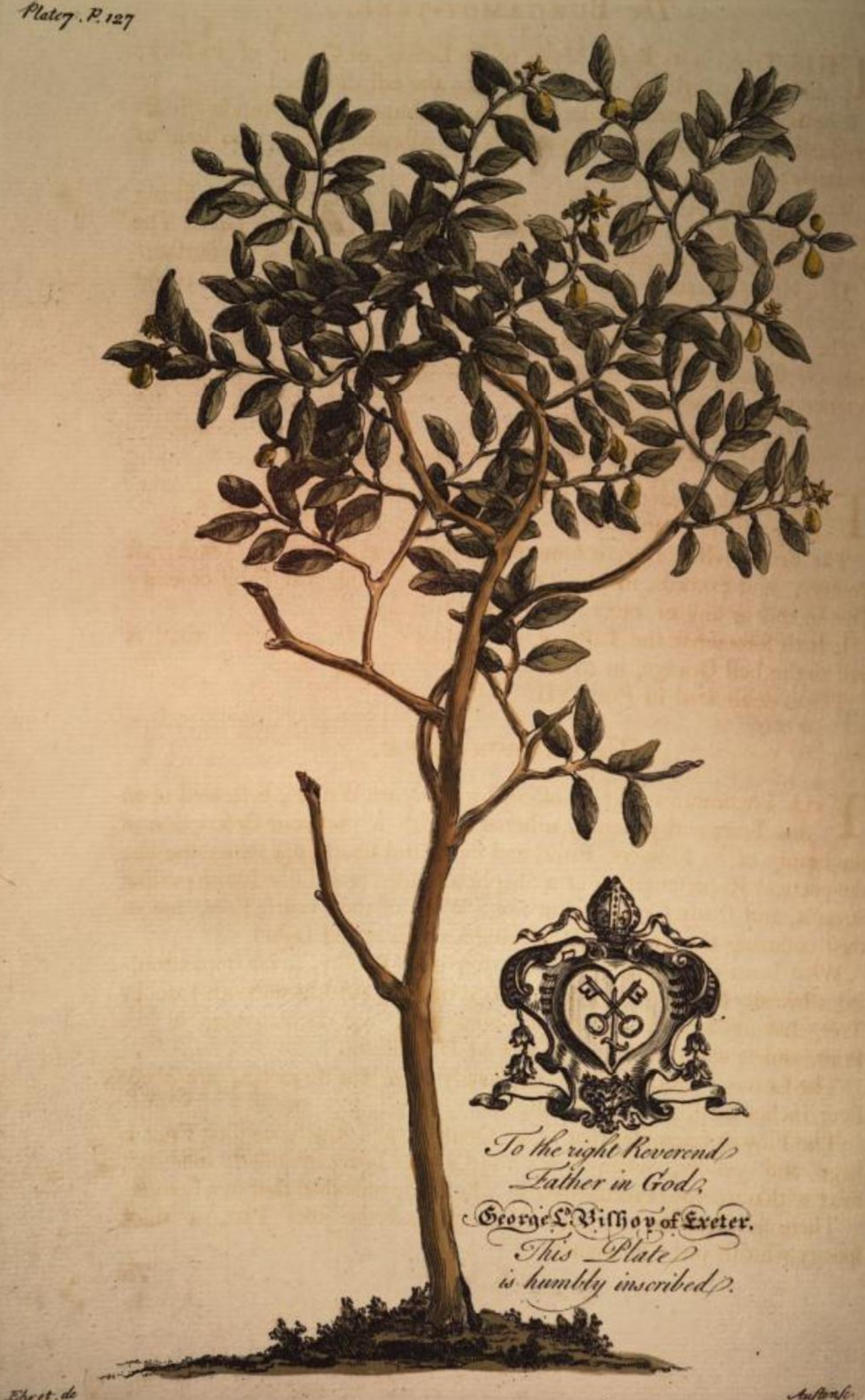
Forbidden fruit tree, Hughes (1750), The Natural History of Barbados, plate 7

What is thought to have been the first description of the forbidden fruit appears in the 1750 work of Griffith Hughes, The Natural History of Barbados. He described the 'Forbidden-fruit-tree' as similar to the orange tree, with fruit larger and longer than an orange. He describes its fruit as having "somewhat the Taste of a Shaddock" but exceeding "in the Delicacy of its Taste, the Fruit of every Tree in this or any of our neighboring Islands" in flavor. Hughes included an illustration of the tree, but his lack of botanical knowledge places the accuracy of his descriptions in doubt. The fruit was not limited to Barbados: in 1756 its presence was reported in Jamaica, describing it as "excell[ing] in sweetness". Given the history in the Caribbean of attempts to propagate the shaddock by seed planting, an approach that has generally proved difficult in reproducing pure pomelo, it is thought that the forbidden fruit arose from seed planting of a natural hybrid of the shaddock (pomelo) and sweet orange, species both known to have been present in Barbados by 1687. Twentieth-century naturalists considered it either to be a variety of pomelo or of the grapefruit, similarly an orange/shaddock cross, but it was not well characterized, and was presumed extinct.

In the 1990s a survey of residents of Saint Lucia found two plants on the island being referred to as the forbidden fruit, one being a variety of the shaddock (pomelo), while the other matching more closely the historical descriptions of the forbidden fruit. This rediscovered hybrid forbidden fruit has a high degree of monoembryony which may make it an important genetic resource for the sweet orange, grapefruit, and rootstock breeding programs.
