= Ginger wine =

Fortified wine

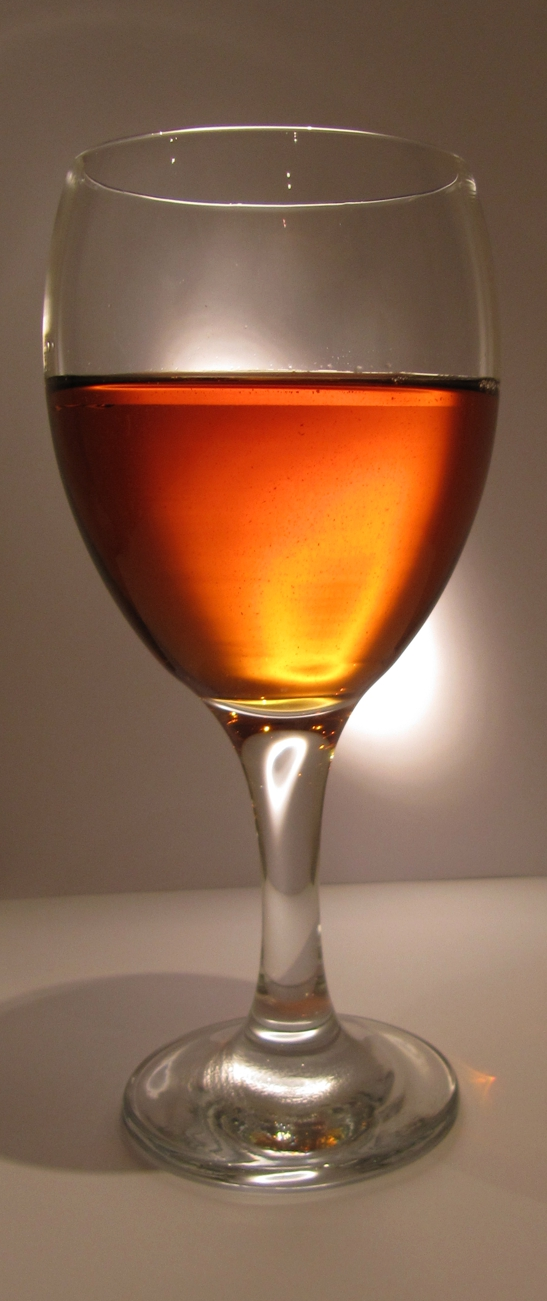
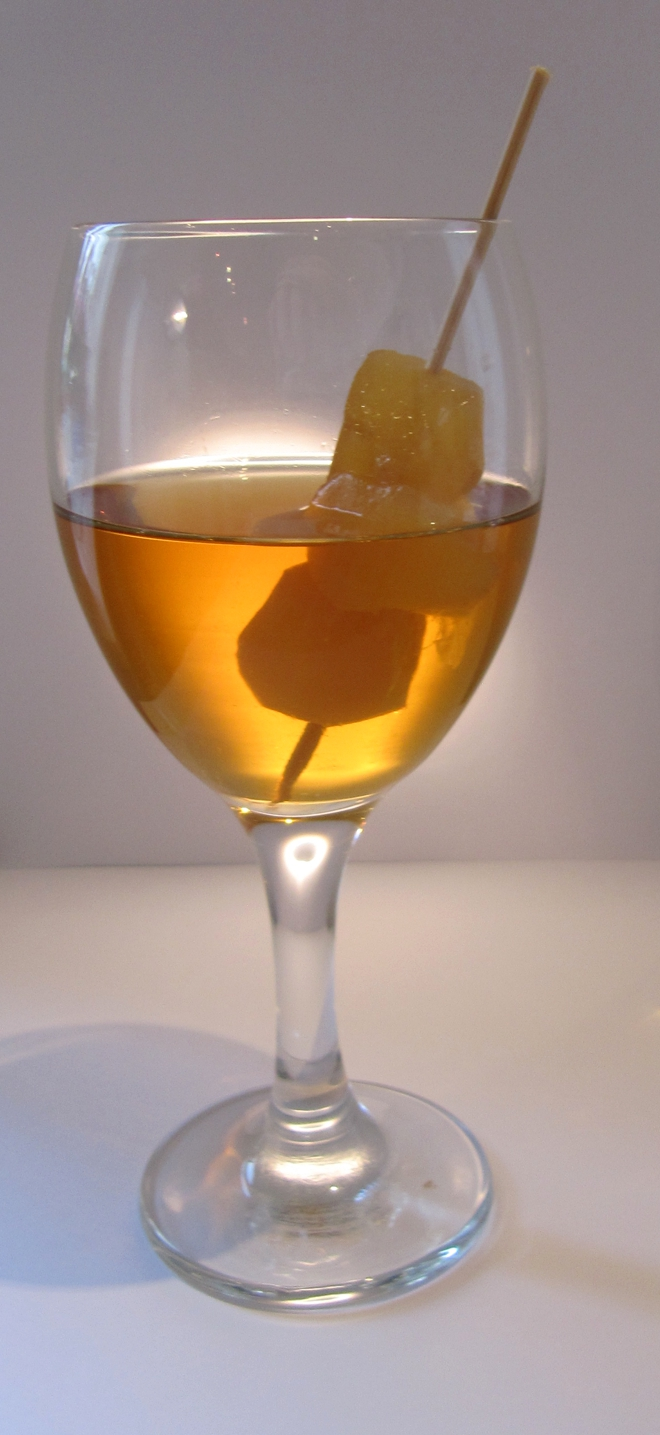
A glass of Stone's ginger wine (left) and German Ginger wine with stem ginger decoration (right).

Ginger wine is a fortified wine often made from a fermented blend of ginger, raisins, sugar and yeast, that is often fortified by being blended with brandy. It is one of the main ingredients of the Whisky Mac cocktail.

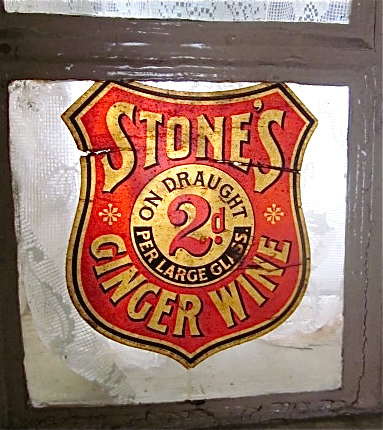
Advert c.1900 for Stone's Ginger wine. The Old King's Head, Kirton, Lincolnshire

Ginger wine originated in England with the foundation of The Finsbury Distilling Company based in the City of London in 1740. The company, like other distillers, was required to build a retail network in compliance with the Gin Act 1751. Joseph Stone, a grocer on High Holborn street, central London, was one of the most prominent and important customers of the Finsbury wines division, and as such, had his name given to their ginger wine.

In the 19th century, sales were boosted by a cholera epidemic and a widely held belief that ginger offered protection against the disease, as well as other claims of medicinal properties such as being hailed as an aid to digestion and an effective aphrodisiac.

In Scotland, ginger wine is a popular traditional drink during Hogmanay, and a non-alcoholic version is often made for children. Its popularity has led to Crabbie's manufacturing their own version.

== See also ==
- Aromatized wine
- Canton (liqueur)
- Ginger ale
- Ginger beer
- Mulled wine
