= Domaine de Canton (liqueur) =

Flavored liqueur

Domaine de Canton is a ginger-flavored liqueur made in France since 2007. Its earlier formulation (called Canton) was made in China from 1992–1997.

== Original recipe ==
Under the name The Original Canton Delicate Ginger Liqueur the liqueur was produced until 1997 in Doumen, a district of the city of Zhuhai in the Pearl River Delta of China's southern Guangdong province, near Macau. It was sold in limited quantity in the United States before high-end Asian fusion cuisine became popular. In its original formulation, the liqueur's ingredients were advertised to include six varieties of ginger, ginseng, "gentle herbs," "finest spirits," brandy, and honey. Its strength was 20 percent alcohol (40 proof), and it was sold in decorative faceted glass bottles of various sizes.

The product's stay on the market lasted from 1992 to 1995. It was officially discontinued after 1997.

== New recipe ==
In 2007, John Cooper (son of the US importer of the original product, N. J. Cooper) revived the name and idea by producing a new ginger liqueur called Canton Ginger & Cognac Liqueur. Canton Ginger Liqueur follows a new recipe and is produced in Marmande, France. The new formula is 28 percent alcohol (56 proof), is golden in color, and is packaged in a bamboo-shaped bottle. It contains syrup made from crystallized Chinese baby ginger, Grand Champagne cognac, neutral spirit, orange blossom honey from Provence, and vanilla.

Domaine de Canton was released in New York City in August 2007. By 2008, the name of the liqueur had changed once again, to Domaine de Canton French Ginger Liqueur.

The liqueur won Double Gold Medal (Best of Show) in the herbal/botanical liqueur category at the 2008 San Francisco World Spirits Competition. It won Best of Show in the 2007–2008 World Beverage Competition.

== Awards ==
Domaine de Canton's packaging won a 2008 Pentawards for packaging design in the luxury spirits category, for its bamboo shaped bottle along with the appointed closure on the top.

== See also ==
- Ginger beer
- Ginger wine
