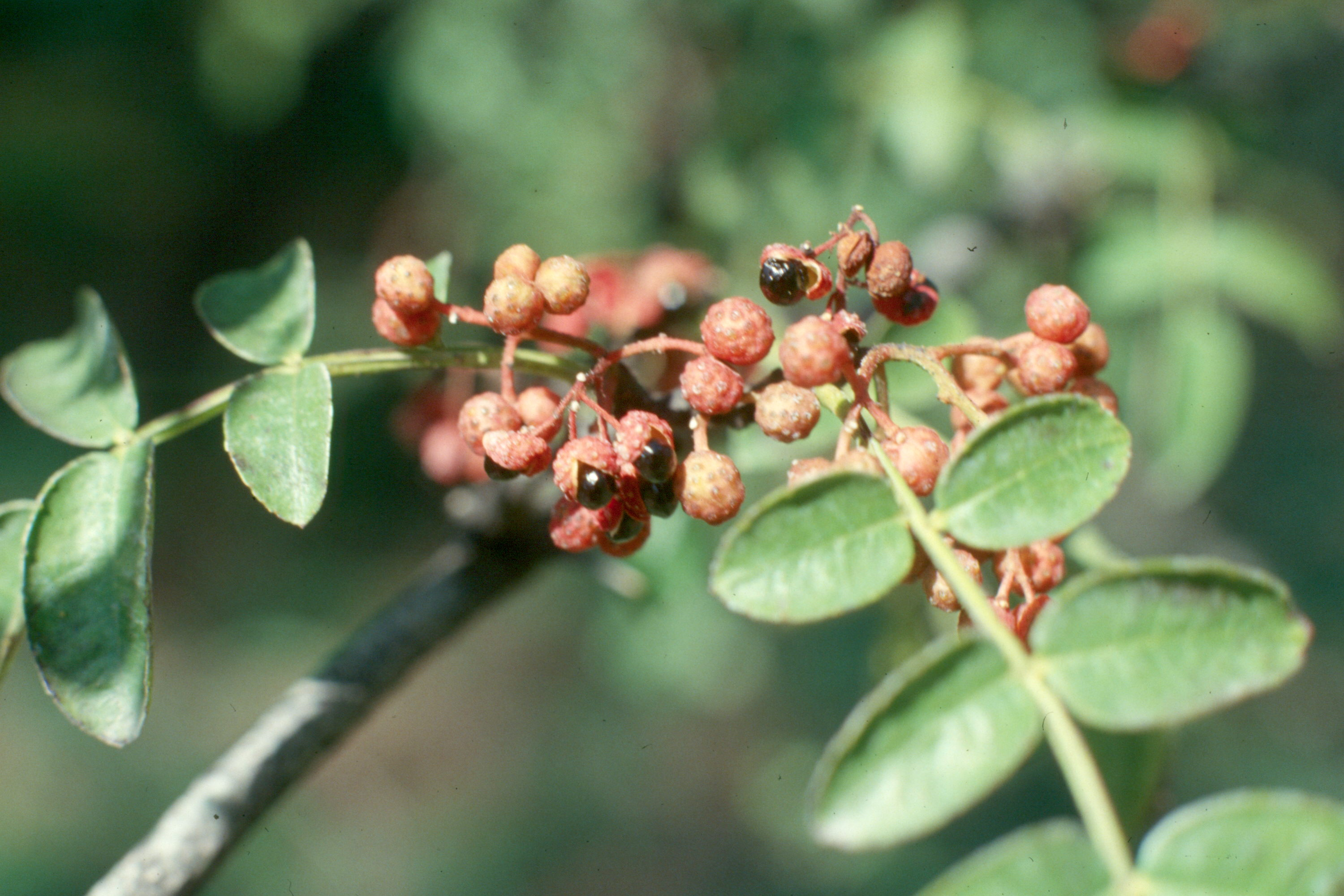
- Zanthoxylum americanum at the Real Jardín Botánico de Madrid

Conservation status
- Least Concern (IUCN 3.1)

Scientific classification
- Kingdom: Plantae
- Clade: Tracheophytes
- Clade: Angiosperms
- Clade: Eudicots
- Clade: Rosids
- Order: Sapindales
- Family: Rutaceae
- Genus: Zanthoxylum
- Species: Z. americanum

Binomial name
- Zanthoxylum americanum Mill.
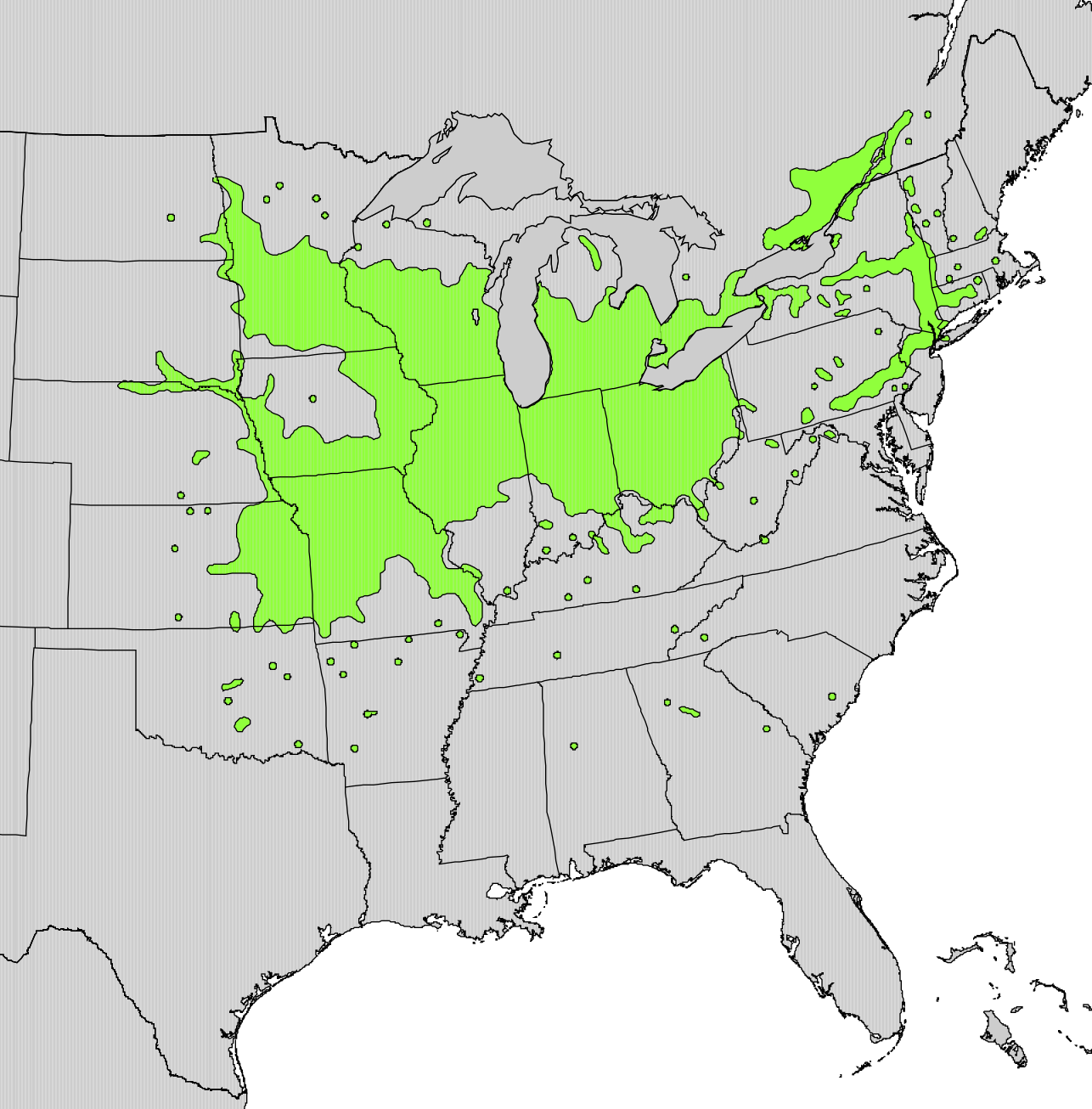
- Natural range

Synonyms
- Mioptrila odorata Raf.; Thylax fraxineum (Willd.) Raf.; Zanthoxylum americanum f. armatius F.C.Gates; Zanthoxylum clava-herculis var. americanum Du Roi; Zanthoxylum fraxineum Willd.; Zanthoxylum fraxinifolium Marshall; Zanthoxylum mite Willd.; Zanthoxylum parvum Shinners; Zanthoxylum ramiflorum Michx.

= Zanthoxylum americanum =

Species of tree

Zanthoxylum americanum, the common prickly-ash, common pricklyash, common prickly ash or northern prickly-ash (also sometimes called toothache tree, yellow wood, or suterberry), is an aromatic shrub or small tree native to central and eastern portions of the United States and Canada. It is the northernmost New World species in the citrus family, Rutaceae, and is the type species in its genus, which includes sichuan pepper. It can grow to 10 meters (33 ft) tall with a diameter at breast height (DBH) of 15 cm (5.9 in). It produces membranous leaflets and axillary flower clusters. The wood is not commercially valuable, but oil extracts from the bark have been used in traditional and alternative medicine and have been studied for antifungal and cytotoxic properties. The genus name is sometimes spelled Xanthoxylum.

== Alternative names and taxonomy ==
Zanthoxylum parvum, known vernacularly as Shinners' tickletongue and small prickly-ash is considered by some botanists to be an isolated and aberrant population of Zanthoxylum americanum.

Originally described by Scottish botanist Philip Miller in 1768, Zanthoxylum americanum is type species of the wide-ranging genus Zanthoxylum in the plant family Rutaceae, which includes many species with aromatic foliage. Miller, who spelled the name Xanthoxylum, described the plant in the eighth edition of his Gardeners Dictionary, as "grow[ing] naturally in Pennsylvania [sic] and Maryland".

== Description ==
The plant has pinnately compound leaves with 5–11 membranous leaflets. It has axillary flower and fruit clusters. The buds are hairy. The dark green leaves are bitter-aromatic, with crenate margins. The stalked follicles are green and then turn red through deep blue through black. Flowers are dioecious, with yellow-green petals.

Flowers appear as umbrella-like clusters from 2–12 in small terminal to axillary umbellate clusters. They are imperfect with pedicels 2–4 m long; there are 4–5 petals, elliptic to ovate-oblong 1.6–1.9 mm long and have green with reddish hairs near the tips; stamens 5; ovary with 2–5 carpels. The fruit is a follicle, with 2 seeds per carpel.

== Distribution and conservation status ==
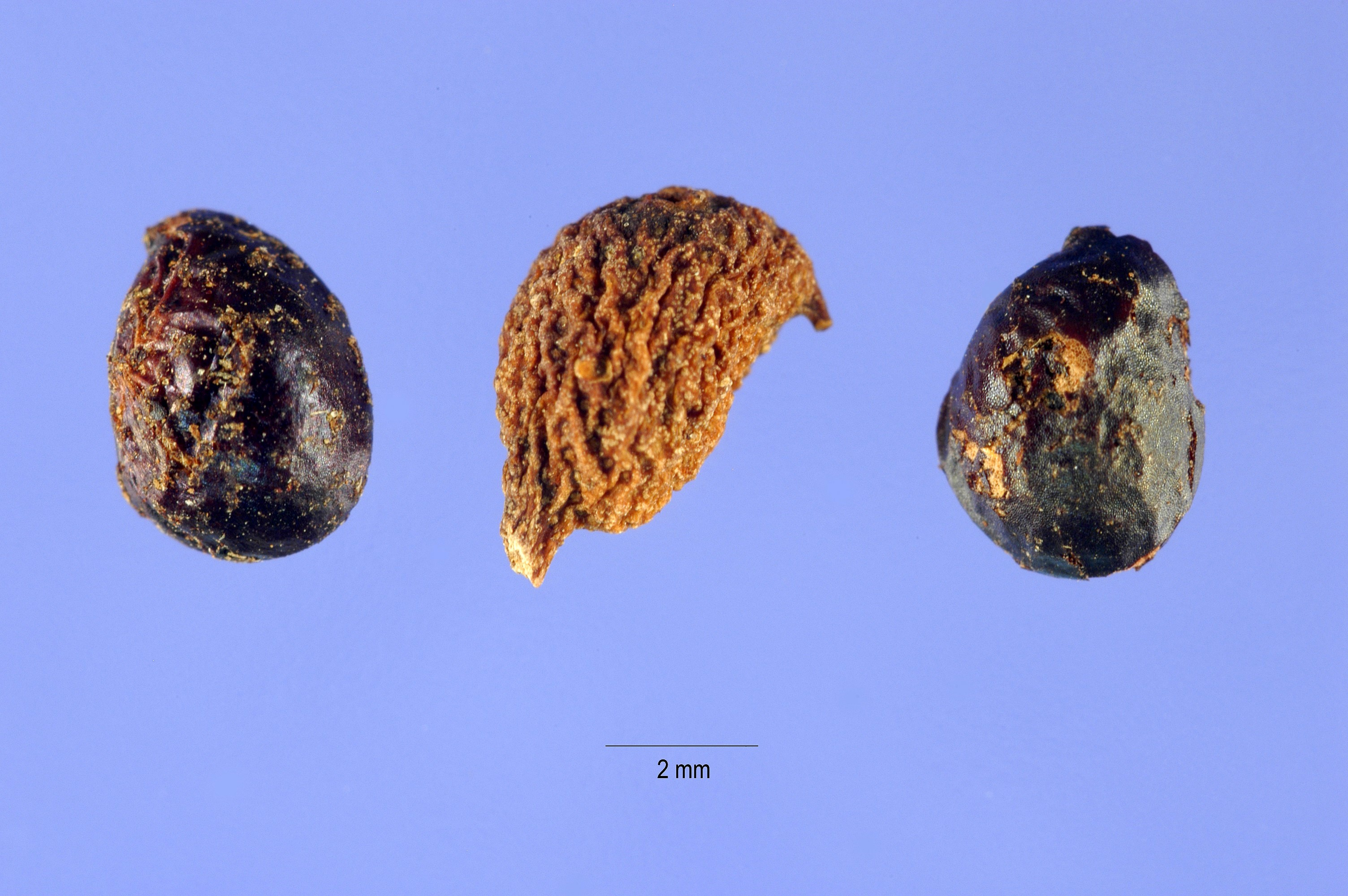
Zanthoxylum americanum berries

Rare in the South, it is more common in the northern United States. In the United States, it occurs in Alabama, Arkansas, Connecticut, Delaware, the District of Columbia, Florida, Georgia, Iowa, Illinois, Indiana, Kansas, Kentucky, Louisiana, Massachusetts, Maryland, Maine, Michigan, Minnesota, Missouri, North Carolina, North Dakota, Nebraska, New Hampshire, New Jersey, New York, Ohio, Oklahoma, Pennsylvania, Rhode Island, South Carolina, South Dakota, Tennessee, Virginia, Vermont, Wisconsin and West Virginia; the species also occurs in Ontario and Quebec in Canada. The species is listed as Endangered in Florida, Maryland, and New Hampshire; and as Special Concern in Tennessee.

Butterflies that use Zanthoxylum americanum as a larval food source include the Thoas swallowtail (Papilio thoas), giant swallowtail (P. cresphontes), and spicebush swallowtail (P. troilus).

This plant was known to the indigenous peoples of the region. It was first described to Europeans by John Bartram in his travels and plant collecting excursions.

=== Zanthoxylum parvum ===
==== Habitat ====
Underlies of maple-oak woodlands or dense growth of small trees like evergreen oak on rocky, often shallow, well-drained, tuff or other igneous rock, at elevations of 1,350–1,750 metres (4,430–5,740 ft).

The understory is primarily native bunchgrasses with a mix of other cacti and herbaceous species. In shaded dense areas, the ground is sparsely inhabited with vegetation but covered with dense leaf litter.

==== Phenology ====
Zanthoxylum parvum flowers in late March until early April, before its leaves have expanded fully. Although foliage is present throughout most of the year it eventually becomes deciduous and turns yellow in mid-October.

==== Comments ====
Zanthoxylum parvum is a rare and poorly understood plant from a few populations in the Davis Mountains

== Medicinal use ==
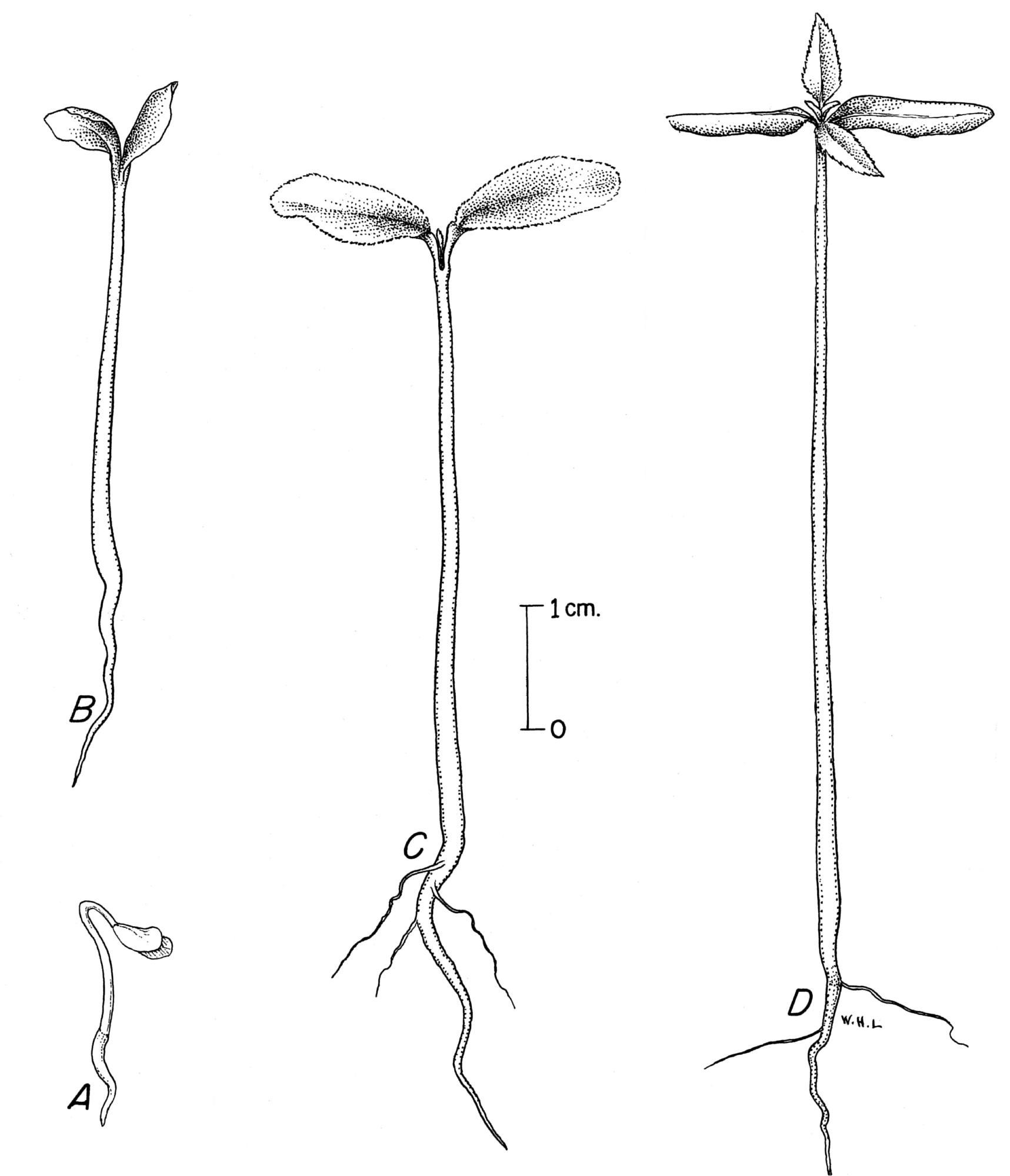
Seedling drawing

=== Traditional ===
An oil extracted from the bark and follicles of the prickly-ash (both this species and Zanthoxylum clava-herculis) has been used in herbal medicine. The extract may act as a stimulant, and historic medicinal use has included use "for chronic rheumatism, typhoid and skin diseases and impurity of the blood..." as well as for digestive ailments. Grieve states, "The berries are considered even more active than the bark, being carminative and antispasmodic, and are used as an aperient and for dyspepsia and indigestion; a fluid extract of the berries being given in doses of 10 to 30 drops." The bark has been chewed for toothaches, and a tea from the follicles has been used for sore throats and as a diuretic. As noted by Michael Dirr, in his Manual of Woody Landscape Plants, "Supposedly the stems and fruits were chewed by the Indians to alleviate toothache for the acrid juice has a numbing effect."

=== Modern studies and uses ===
There have been some modern studies of the oil's chemical constituents and their antifungal and cytotoxic effects.

In 2012, a Pennsylvania distillery introduced a bitters called Bartram's Bitters that uses prickly ash bark as one of several botanical ingredients. The concoction was based on a recipe for "Bartram's Homestead Bitters" that was found in a book that belonged to the family of botanist John Bartram.

== Images ==
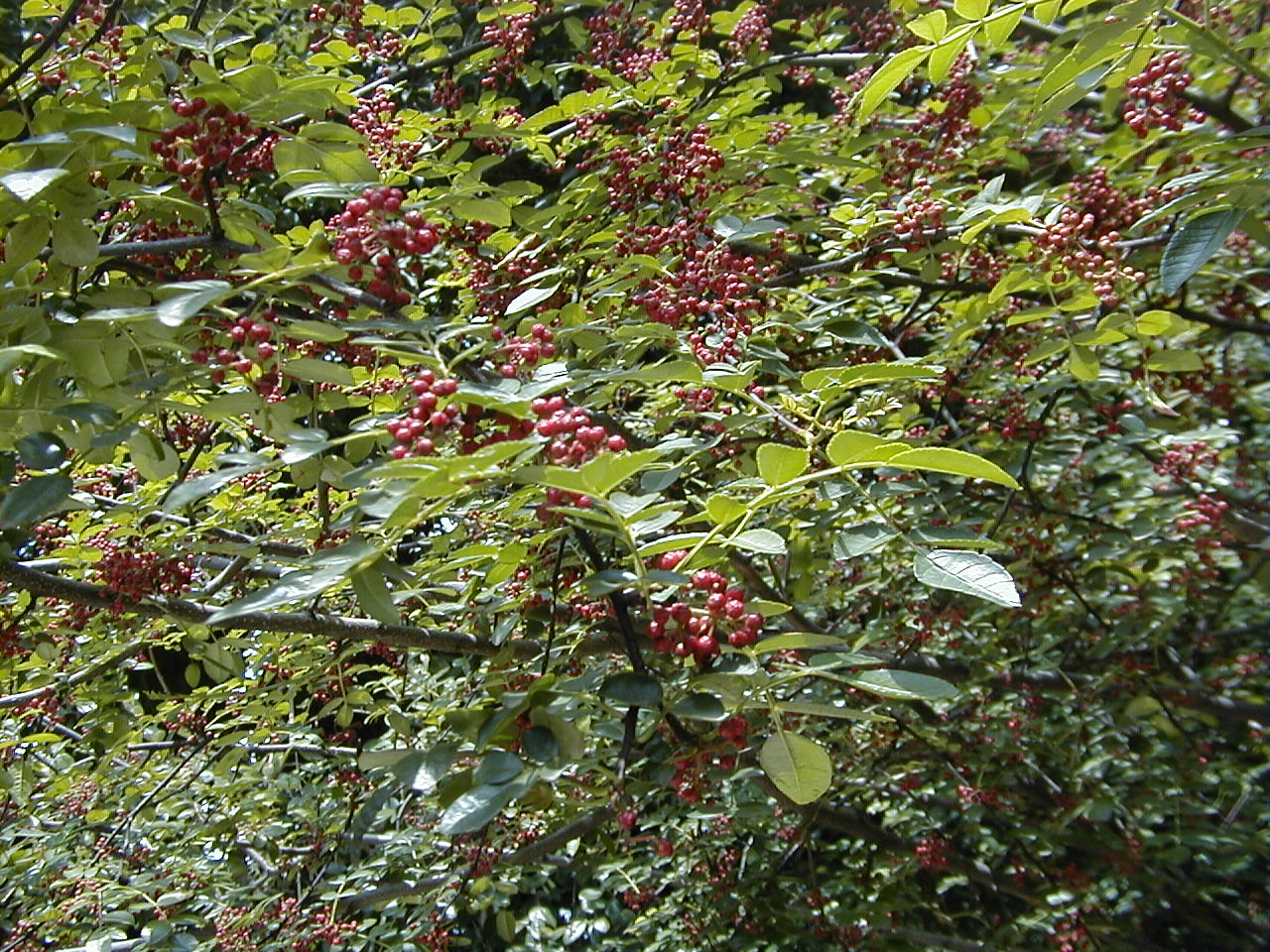

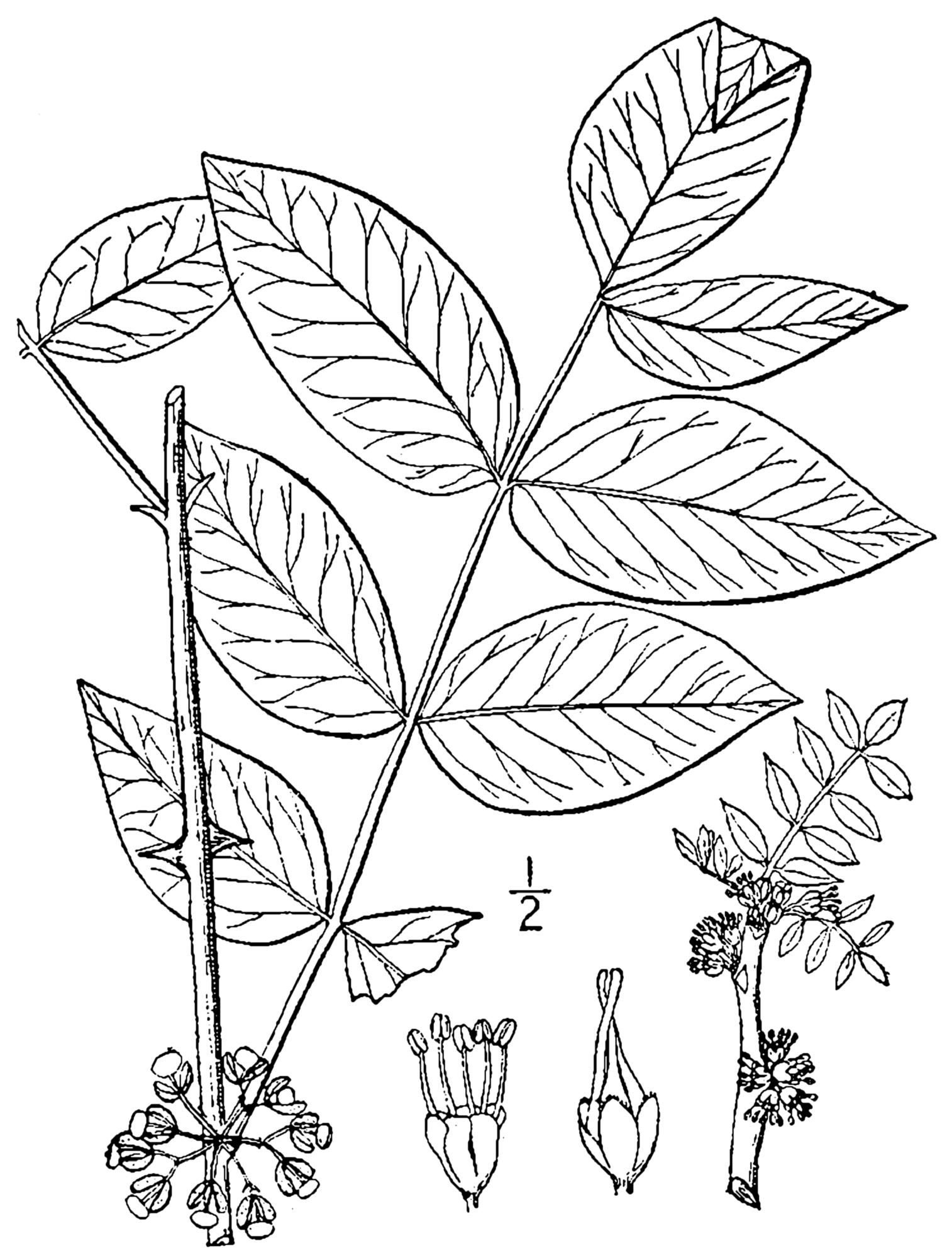

== See also ==
- Trees of Canada
- Agonopterix paulae
