= Charles Jacquin et Cie =

American food and alcoholic beverage company

Charles Jacquin et Cie, Inc. (Jacquin's) is a producer, distiller, rectifier, manufacturer, and importer of alcoholic beverages and food products. It is a wholly owned subsidiary of Chatam International Incorporated, and is based in Philadelphia, Pennsylvania. The company was founded in 1884 by Charles Jacquin, a Frenchman who emigrated to Philadelphia. It claims to be the oldest producer of cordials in the United States and the only cordial producer in Pennsylvania.

In addition to products made at its facilities in Philadelphia, Jacquin's imports from distilleries and ingredient sources it owns in France and China. In 1982, they developed and produced the popular Chambord (liqueur) raspberry liqueur until they sold it to Brown-Forman Corporation in 2006. It is also the manufacturer and importer of St Dalfour Gourmet French brand of fine jellies and jams. Its products are exported to major countries throughout the world via intermediaries and agents.

== Products and Brands ==
- Jacquin's Spirits
  - White Label Rum
  - Gold Label Rum
  - London Tower Gin
  - Vodka Royale 80
  - Vodka Royale 100
  - Vodka Royale 151
- Jacquin's Cordials
  - Sloe Gin
  - Crème de menthe
  - Crème de cassis
  - Creme de Cacao
  - Triple Sec
  - Grenadine
  - Banana Liqueur
  - Anisette
  - Amaretto
  - Peppermint Schnapps
- Jacquin's Brandies
  - Five Star Brandy
  - Blackberry Brandy
  - Cherry Brandy
  - Peach Brandy
  - Coffee Brandy
  - Apricot Brandy
  - Ginger Brandy
- Jacquin's Rock and Rye Liqueur
- Pennsylvania Dutch Cream Liqueur
  - Peaches & Cream
  - Salted Caramel
  - Pumpkin Spice
  - Egg Nog
  - Bourbon Cream
  - Strawberries & Cream
  - Peppermint Bark
  - Chocolate Cream
  - Lemon Cream Pie
- The Union Forge Vodka
- Bartender's Trading Ready to drink Cocktails
  - Strong Island Iced Tea
  - Paloma
  - Espresso Martini
  - I'm Bananas Over You
  - Awesome Orange
  - Mudslide
  - Coconut Rum Cream
  - Hot Sex
  - Piña Colada
  - Horchata
  - Margarita
- The Roaster's Daughter Espresso Martini
- Juliette Artisanal Peach Liqueur
- Irish Manor Irish cream Liqueur
- Savory & James Port Wines and Sherries
  - Tawny Porto
  - Ruby Porto
  - Fino Dry Sherry
  - Amontillado Medium Sherry
  - Cream Sherry
- Sweet Revenge Wild Strawberry Sour Mash Liqueur
- Royal Montaine Orange Cognac Liqueur
