= Liqueur coffee =

Coffee-based cocktail

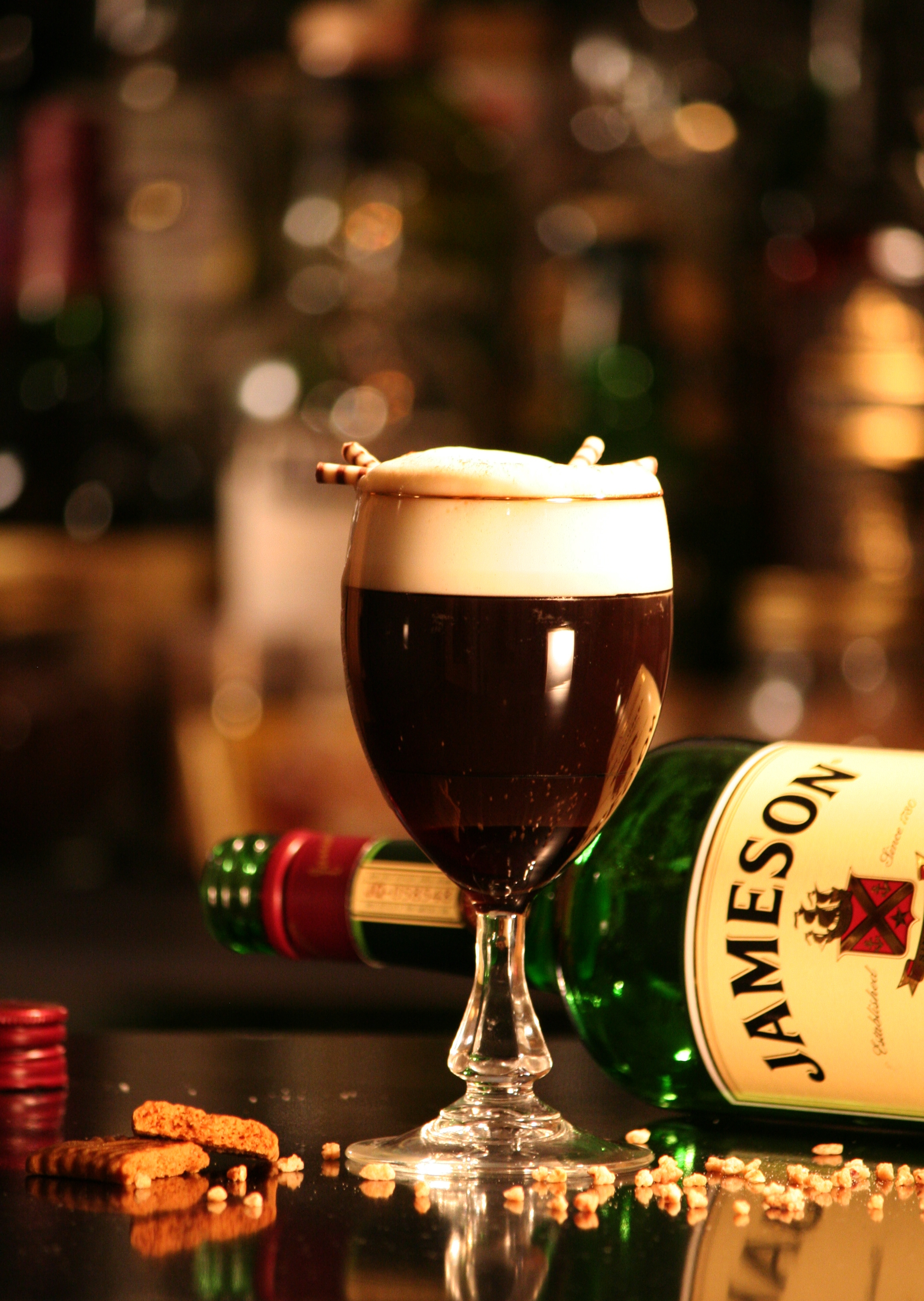
Irish coffee

A liqueur coffee is a caffeinated alcoholic drink that consists of a shot of liqueur, mixed into coffee. It is typically served in a liqueur glass, often accompanied with cream and sugar. Coffee liqueur beverages are served in different fashions and can be found throughout many countries. One of the most popular liqueur coffee beverage is commonly known as Irish coffee. Liqueur coffee beverages are largely classified as cocktails as well as digestifs which are aimed at aiding the digestive process typically after a meal.

== History ==
Historically, a liqueur has been an alcoholic drink with syrup qualities containing additives that sweeten and flavor the beverage. However, coffee liqueur (which subsequently get served like traditional coffee with add-ins like cream or sugar) was first produced in the 16th century.

Throughout the years, coffee liqueurs have been made with a variety of additives and types of alcohol, although it generally has a rum base with coffee and vanilla flavorings. Some of its core ingredients include roasted coffee beans and their powder, sugar (white or brown), vanilla syrup, espresso, and alcohol. The roasted coffee is steeped along with the sugar and other ingredients in the alcohol to produce the coffee liqueur.

One of the most popular coffee liqueurs has become the Kahlua, which has been manufactured in Mexico since 1936. Other than liqueurs, there are various types of other alcoholic beverages that are also frequently mixed with other ingredients to produce liqueur coffee. Some of the other most popular include vodka, rum, bourbon, and whiskey.

== Varieties of liqueur coffee origins ==
=== Europe ===
This is a list of names sometimes given to liqueur coffees in Europe. Some, such as Irish coffee, are widely used and more-or-less standard, with an official recipe from the International Bartenders Association. Others are local and idiosyncratic. There are many variations in nomenclature: the same name may be used for different combinations:

- Whiskey coffee or Irish coffee
  - Whiskey coffee is most often known as Irish coffee. Though many people claim to be the first to create Irish coffee, it is most credited to Joe Sheridan, who found it in winter 1943 in Ireland. It is served as a cocktail and is typically prepared with a teaspoon of sugar, 4 ounces of rich hot coffee and lightly whipped double cream on top.
  - Irish coffee is sometimes referred to as Gaelic coffee as well. Irish cream coffee is a variant served with Irish cream. It is commonly also known as Baileys coffee or Sultan Special coffee, when served specifically with the brand, Baileys.
- Grand French Coffee
  - Grand French Coffee is a drink made from Grand Marnier. It is typically prepared in a coffee mug with whipped cream and is commonly referred to as a cocktail.
- Café com cheirinho
  - Cafe Com Cheirinho is a liqueur coffee beverage originating from Portugal. It classified as an after-dinner drink and is used as a digestif. It is mostly prepared with either wine or a type of Brandy.
  - Other names related involve, Parisienne coffee, French coffee, or Cafe Royale, with grape brandy, such as cognac or armagnac.
- Rudesheimer Kaffee
  - Rudesheimer Kaffee is coffee liqueur beverage that originated in Germany in 1957. It is prepared with sugar cubes and Asbach Brandy, topped with sweetened cream and chocolate shavings as a cocktail.
- Caffè Corretto
  - Caffe Corretto is an Italian coffee beverage that has been popularized worldwide. It is a generally served as cocktail and prepared with a shot of chilled espresso, Galliano Ristretto, simple syrups, and Amaro di Toscana. It can also be served with vodka, grappa, or sambuca.
- Kaffekask
  - Kaffekask is a coffee beverage that originated from Sweden. It is served as a cocktail and is prepared with flavored Schnapps and often, sugar.
- Drambuie Coffee
  - Drambuie coffee is a classic liqueur coffee cocktail that consists of Scottish liqueur consisting of Scotch Malt Whisky and Heather Honey. It is typically topped with whipped cream as well.
- Braeckman Flemish Coffee
  - Braeckman Flemish Coffee is a ready made coffee liqueur beverage. It is served hot and with a dollop of whipped cream on top.
- Norman coffee, with Calvados
  - Norman coffee with calvados is liqueur coffee beverage classified as a cocktail. It is prepared typically with hot coffee, calvados, honey, vanilla syrup, and whipped cream.
- Kúmen Kaffi, with Brennivín,
- Corfu coffee, Kumquat liquor
- Seville coffee with Cointreau
- Tilburg coffee, with Schrobbelèr
- Monk's coffee, with Bénédictine
- Friar's coffee/Friar-Joe, with Frangelico
- Hasseltse koffie, with jenever

=== The Americas ===
Here is a list of coffee liqueur beverages commonly served in the Americas.

- English Coffee, with Gin
  - English Coffee with Gin is a liqueur coffee beverage that is served as a cocktail. It is typically prepared with Triple sec, Kahlua, and whipped cream.
- Calypso coffee, Spanish coffee, or Jamaican coffee
  - Often served with rum and Tia Maria or Kahlúa
  - Calypso Coffee is a cocktail that is prepared with Tia Maria and whipped cream.
- Witch's coffee, Strega
  - Witches Coffee is an American coffee beverage that is prepared with sugar, rum, Strega (Saffron-infused liqueur) and Averna Cream.
- Cafe Caribbean
  - Cafe Caribbean is a cocktail originating in Jamaica. It prepared with rum, amaretto, whipped cream and often, shaved almonds
- Carajillo
  - Carajillo is a liqueur coffee beverage that is served as digestif after meals. It is prepared with espresso, Licor 43 (a sweet Spanish liqueur), and over ice.
- American Coffee with bourbon/ Kentucky Coffee
  - An American liqueur coffee beverage served as a digestif. It is prepared with bourbon heavy cream, and sugar.
- Mexican Coffee with Tequila and Kahlúa
- Coffee with absinthe
- Fire Department Coffee produces coffee infused with spirits such as rum, tequila, whisky, and bourbon.

=== Other regions ===
- Australian coffee, with Bundaberg Rum
  - Australian coffee is mild coffee beverage with a shot of Bundaberg Rum. It is often prepared with sugar and cream and it served in a warm glass.
- Shin Shin coffee, with rum
- Golden Irish Coffee from India
  - Golden Irish Coffee is an exotic coffee liqueur found in few places in India. It is served as a cocktail and consists of a cup of hot water, a shot of espresso, caramel sauce, and Irish Whiskey.
- Mustang coffee, found primarily in Nepal, consisting of coffee, sugar or honey, butter, and raksi.

== See also ==
- List of coffee drinks#Liqueur coffee
- List of liqueurs#Coffee
