= French coffee =

French coffee may refer to:

- French coffee, coffee prepared using one of the French methods
- French coffee, an alcoholic beverage consisting primarily of coffee and brandy
- French coffee, an alternative name (particularly in the United Kingdom) for chicory coffee
- Grand French Coffee, an alcoholic beverage consisting primarily of coffee and Grand Marnier
- French roast, a coffee bean temperature during processing (i.e. pyrolysis)

== See also ==
- French coffee maker (disambiguation)
- Café au lait
- Café gourmand
- Café liégeois
