= Caffè corretto =

Beverage of espresso and liquor

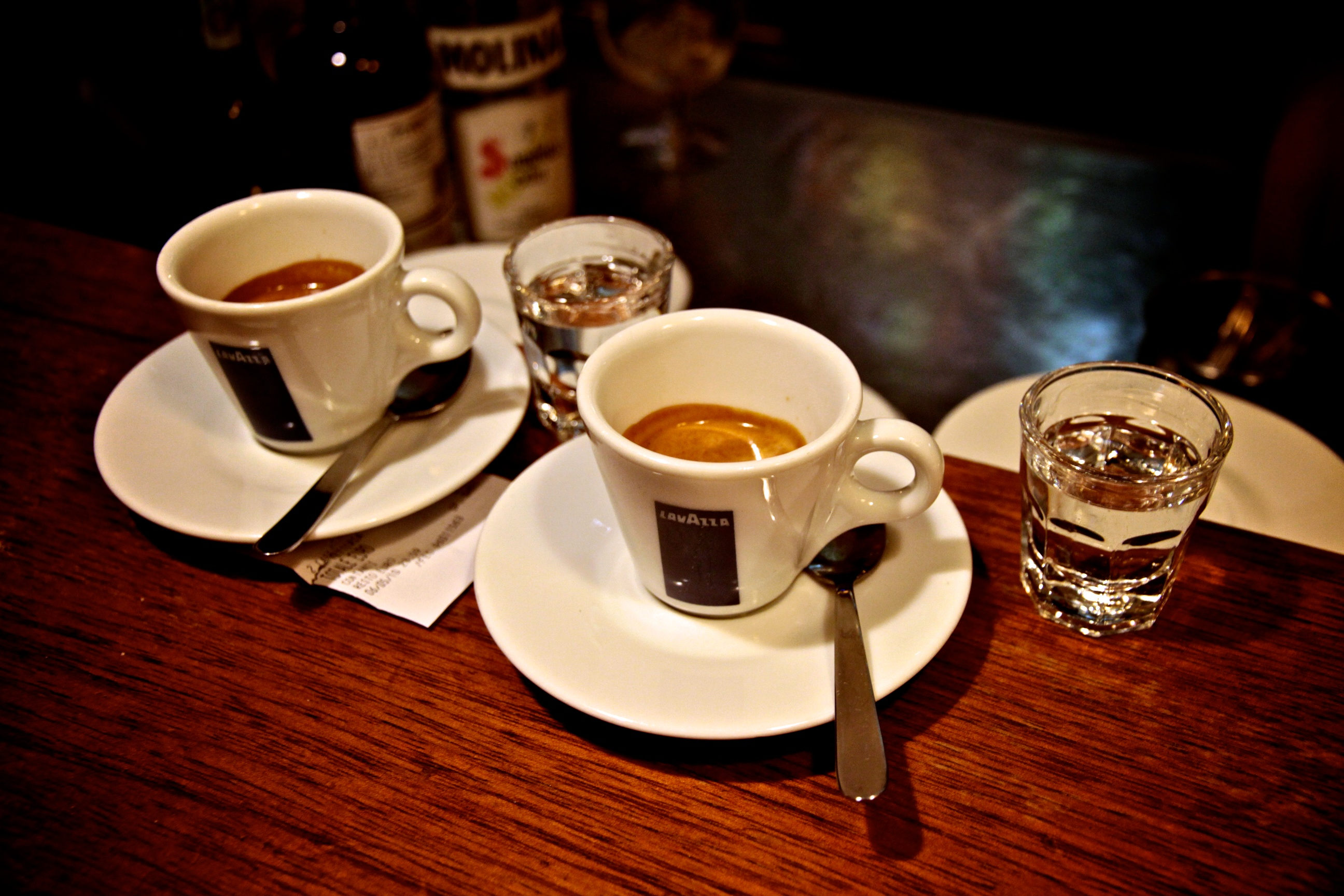
- Coffee served with alcohol on the side so that the coffee can be "corrected" by adding the spirit
- Place of origin: Italy
- Main ingredients: Espresso, liquor

Caffè corretto (Italian: [kafˈfɛ korˈrɛtto]; lit. 'corrected coffee') is an Italian coffee, consisting of a shot of espresso with a small amount of liquor or liqueur. Grappa is a traditional choice, although sambuca, brandy, or other spirits are also used. The Italian word corretto means 'corrected', referring to the addition of alcohol to the coffee.

== Ordering, preparation and serving ==
The drink is ordered by specifying the spirit, for example un caffè corretto alla grappa, alla sambuca, or al cognac. Grappa is a traditional choice for the addition, although sambuca, brandy, or other spirits are also used.

A caffè corretto is typically prepared by adding a small quantity of the desired spirit into an espresso shot. The alcohol may be served separately alongside the coffee, allowing the drinker to add the desired amount, or added before serving as a single beverage.

Historically, caffè corretto was associated with morning consumption in northern Italy, while in central and south-central Italy it was commonly taken after meals as a digestif. Northern Italians commonly corrected coffee with grappa, brandy or aquavit, while parts of central, south-central, and southern Italy favored anise-flavored liquor, such as Strega in Benevento and Centerba in Abruzzo.

== Etymology ==
The Italian word corretto corresponds to the English word 'corrected'. The term means coffee that has been 'corrected' by adding a small amount of alcohol.

Historian Diana Garvin has suggested that the need to "correct" coffee may have originated during the Fascist period, when tariffs and economic sanctions made coffee more expensive and substitutes made from barley and chicory became more common. According to this hypothesis, adding alcohol helped mask or "correct" the flavor of these substitutes.

== History ==
Although the practice of combining coffee and alcohol predates the name, caffè corretto became established in Italian coffee culture during the second quarter of the 20th century.

== Outside of Italy ==
In Spain, a similar drink is known in Spanish as carajillo and as cigaló in Catalan, with any local spirit; in Portugal café com cheirinho (coffee with scent); in France café-calva (coffee and Calvados) or champoreau; in Sweden, Norway, and Denmark kaffekask, karsk, or kaffegök; and in Mexico cafe con piquete.

Caffè corretto can also be found widely in Eritrea, a legacy of the Italian colonization of Eritrea. In Asmarino, locally produced areki and cognac are used.

== Related traditions ==
In Veneto and Trentino, resentin (also known as rasentin) is a related custom in which, after finishing a cup, a small amount of liquor is added to the dregs to "rinse out" the remaining coffee, allowing the entire serving of coffee to be consumed.

== See also ==
- List of coffee drinks
- Liqueur coffee
