= Gourmand (disambiguation) =

A gourmand is a lover of good food and drink.

Gourmand may also refer to:

- Gourmand (fragrance), a genre of modern perfume
- Gourmand syndrome, a rare medical condition
- Café gourmand, a French culinary concept
