= Aguardiente =

Generic term for alcoholic beverages containing 29% to 60% alcohol by volume

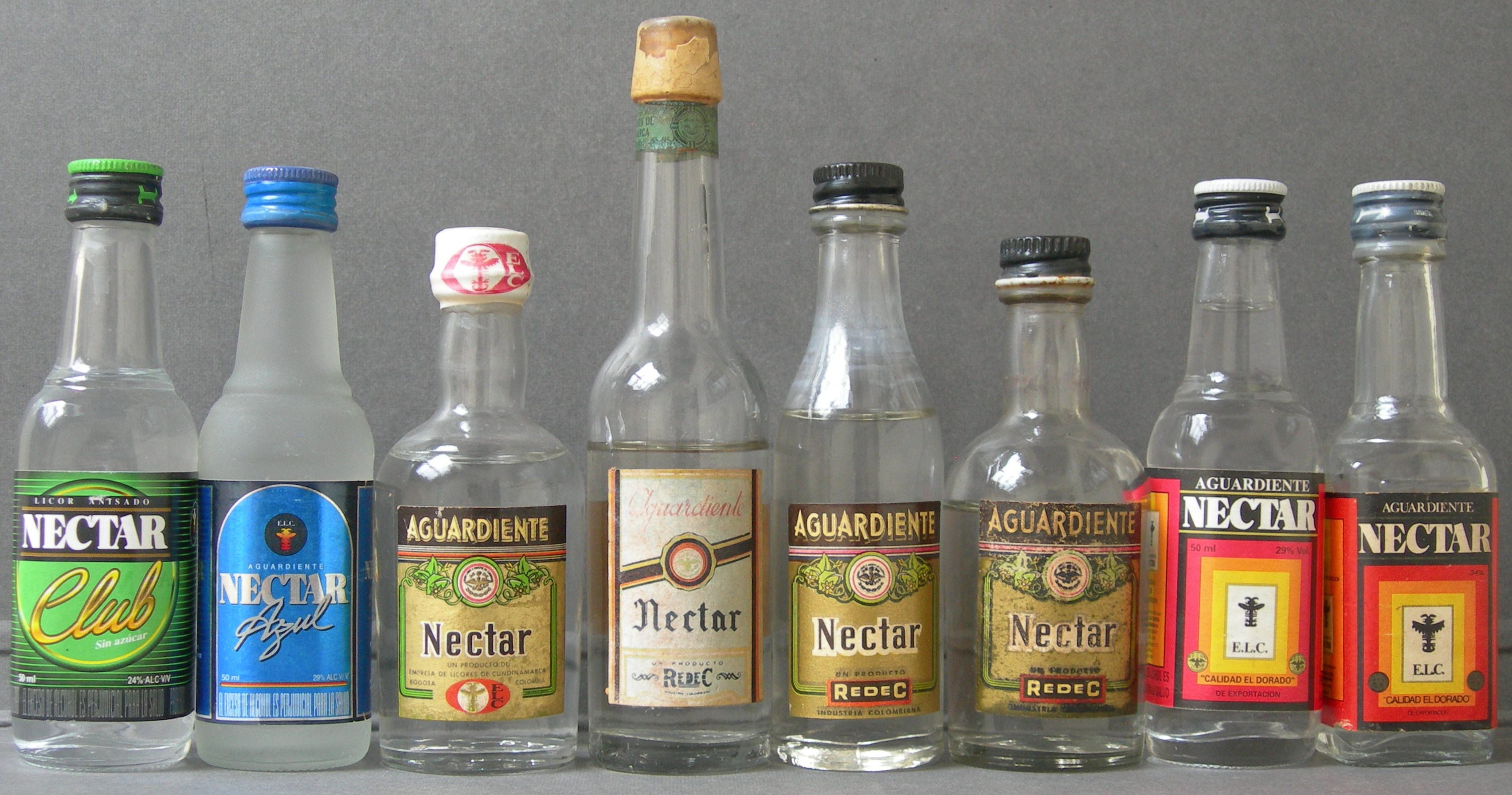
- Various bottles of Colombian aguardiente
- Origin: Spain, Portugal
- Alcohol by volume: 29% to 60%

Aguardiente (Spanish pronunciation: [ˌaɣwaɾˈðjente]; lit. 'ardent water'; Portuguese: aguardente, pronounced [ˌaɣwaɾˈðẽtɨ] or [ˌaɡwaʁˈdẽtʃi]) is a type of distilled alcoholic spirit that contains between 29% and 60% alcohol by volume (ABV). It is a somewhat generic term that can refer to liquors made from various plants. It originates from and is typically consumed on the Iberian Peninsula and in Ibero-America.

== Etymology ==
The word is a compound of the Iberian languages' words for 'water' (agua in Castilian, i.e. Spanish; aigua in Catalan; água in Portuguese; auga in Galician) and 'burning'/'fiery' (ardiente in Castilian; ardent in Catalan; ardente in Portuguese and Galician). A comparable word in English is "firewater", though the English term is colloquial or humorous, whereas aguardiente is stylistically neutral in Spanish.

== Definition ==
Aguardientes are strong alcoholic beverages obtained by fermentation then distillation of sugared or sweet musts, vegetable macerations, or mixtures of the two. This is the most generic level; by this definition, aguardientes may be made from many different sources. Fruit-based aguardientes include those made from oranges, grapes, bananas, or medronho ("cane apple"). Grain-based ones may be made from millet, barley, or rice and tuber-based aguardientes from beet, manioc, or potato, and finally what are classed as "true" aguardientes from sugarcane and other sweet canes, including some species of bamboo.

Cane aguardiente and cachaça are similar but distinct products. Brazil defined cane aguardiente as an alcoholic beverage of between 38% and 54% ABV, obtained by simple fermentation and distillation of sugarcane that has already been used in sugar production and has a distinct flavor similar to rum. Cachaça, on the other hand, is an alcoholic beverage of between 38% and 48% ABV, obtained by fermenting and distilling sugarcane juice, and may have added sugar up to 6 g/L.

=== Regulation ===
According to Spanish and Portuguese versions of European Union spirits regulations, aguardiente and aguardente are generic Spanish and Portuguese terms, respectively, for some of the distilled spirits that are fermented and distilled exclusively from their specified raw materials, contain no added alcohol or flavoring substances, and if sweetened, only "to round off the final taste of the product". However, aguardiente and aguardente are not legal denominations.

Instead, different categories of aguardientes (spirits in the English version) are established according to raw materials. In the Spanish version, wine spirit (brandy) is aguardiente de vino, fruit spirit is aguardiente de fruta, grain spirit (other than whiskey and neutral grain spirit) is aguardiente de cereales, etc.

Many aguardentes have a protected designation of origin:

- Portugal
  - Aguardente Bagaceira Alentejo
  - Aguardente Bagaceira Bairrada (grape marc of Bairrada)
  - Aguardente Bagaceira da Região dos Vinhos Verdes
  - Aguardente de Vinho Ribatejo
  - Aguardente de Vinho Alentejo
  - Aguardente de Vinho Lourinhã
  - Aguardente de Vinho Douro (wine spirit of Douro)
  - Aguardente de Vinho da Região dos Vinhos Verdes
- Spain
  - Aguardiente de sidra de Asturias (cider spirit of Asturias)
  - Aguardiente de hierbas de Galicia (herbal spirit of Galicia)

== Regional variations ==
Some drinks named aguardiente or similar are of different origins (grape pomace, sugarcane); other drinks with the same origin may have different names (clairin, brandy).

=== Brazil ===
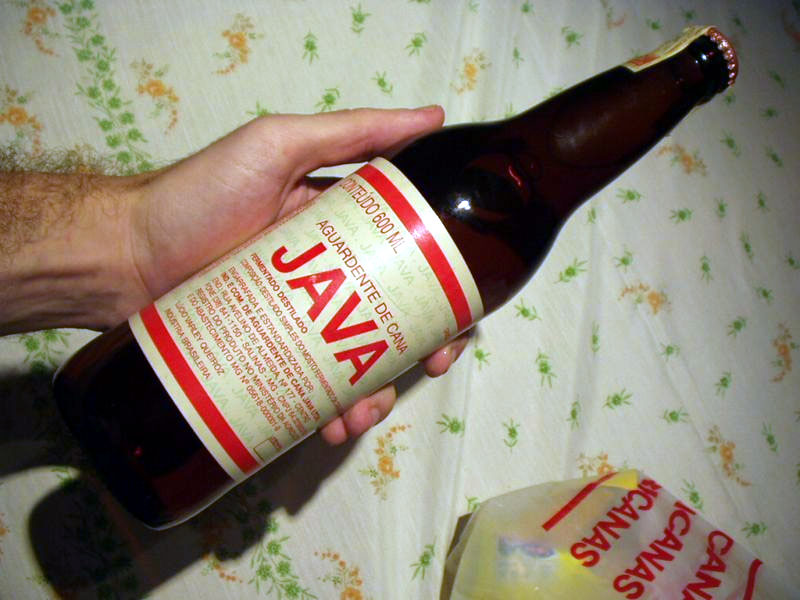
Brazilian cachaça bottle

In Brazil, a beverage known as cachaça or pinga, considered distinct from traditional aguardiente, is made from sugarcane. Cachaça has two varieties: unaged (white) and aged (gold). White cachaça is usually bottled immediately after distillation and tends to be cheaper. It is often used to prepare caipirinha and other beverages in which cachaça is an ingredient. Dark cachaça, usually seen as the "premium" variety, is aged in wood barrels and is meant to be drunk neat. Traditionally, no herbs are used to flavor the cachaça; its flavor is influenced by the fermentation agent, time spent in the cask, or the type of wood from which the barrel is made.

One form that can be qualified as moonshine is known as "Maria Louca" ("Crazy Mary"). This is aguardiente, made in jails by inmates. It can be made from many cereals, ranging from beans to rice, or whatever can be converted into alcohol, be it fruit peels or candy, using improvised and illegal equipment.

=== Cape Verde ===
Grogue, also known as grogu or grogo (derived from English grog), is a Cape Verdean alcoholic beverage, an aguardiente made from sugarcane processed in a trapiche. Its production is fundamentally artisanal, and nearly all the sugarcane is used in producing grogue.

=== Chile ===
In Chile, aguardiente is an alcoholic beverage of 45% and higher ABV (beverages with over 55% ABV are illegal). It is made, like Italian grappa, by distilling the grape residue, primarily the skins and pulp (hollejo) plus the stems (escobajos) and seeds, left over from winemaking after pressing the grapes. It is used to make several other flavored liquors, such as the murtado or enmurtillado (using sun-dried murtilla, an orange-reddish wild rose fruit), the enguindado (soaking sun-dried morello cherries) and licor de oro (flavored with saffron and lemon peel). Dried mint, peeled walnuts, almonds, and other aromatic herbs are also used to flavor the aguardiente. It is mainly consumed by itself or as a base to make cola de mono ("monkey tail").

=== Colombia ===
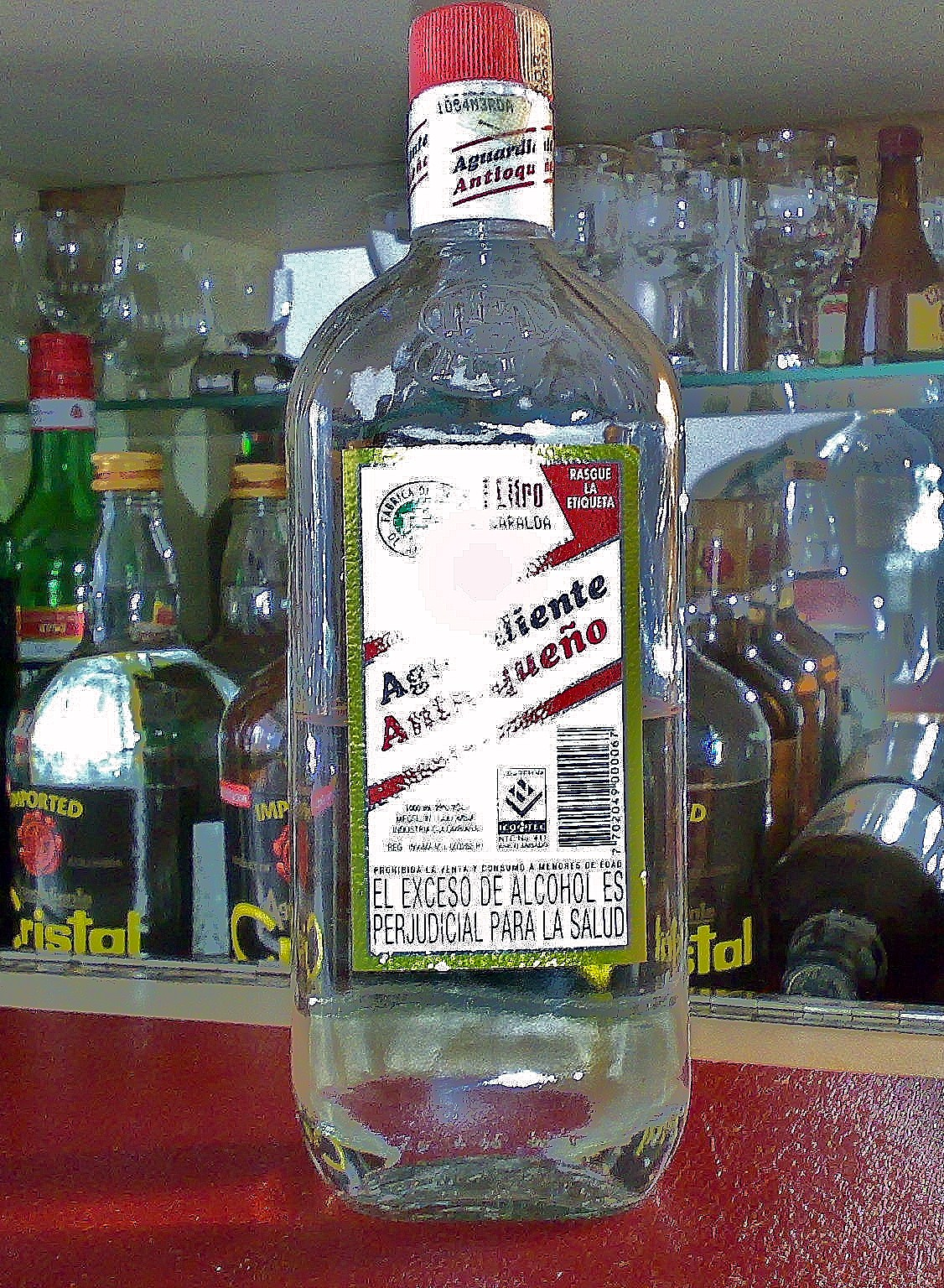
Colombian aguardiente antioqueño

In Colombia, aguardiente is an anise-flavored liqueur derived from sugarcane, popular in the Andean region. Different flavors are obtained by adding different amounts of aniseed, leading to extensive marketing and fierce competition between brands. Aguardiente has 24%–29% alcohol content. Other anise-flavored liqueurs similar to aguardiente, but with a lower alcohol content, are also sold. Since the Spanish era, aguardiente has maintained the status of the most popular alcoholic beverage in the Andean regions of Colombia, with the notable exception of the Caribbean region, where rum is most popular. Generally, aguardiente is rarely drunk in cocktails and usually drunk neat.

On the Caribbean coast, there is a moonshine called "Cococho", an aguardiente infamous for the number of blindness cases due to the addition of methanol.

=== Costa Rica ===
In Costa Rica, it is 30% alcohol, with a neutral flavor. The Costa Rican government tightly controls Guaro to help prevent clandestine production.

=== Guam and the Mariana Islands ===
In Guam and the Mariana Islands, a distilled version of tubâ (coconut palm wine introduced from the Philippines) is known as aguajente (also aguayente or agi). It is similar to Filipino lambanóg. It was prevalent among the Chamorro people, but is largely extinct; the United States banned its manufacture soon after the acquisition of Guam from the Spanish Empire in 1899. A local company "Aguayente distillers" has recently installed a commercial still and will soon start distilling liquor from locally grown potatoes.

=== Ecuador ===
In Ecuador, aguardiente is also derived from sugar cane, but unlike Colombia, it is left largely unflavoured. It is then taken straight as shots, mulled with cinnamon (canela in Spanish) and fruit juices to make the hot cocktail canelazo, or mixed with the juice of naranjilla and spices for the hot cocktail draquita. Locally or artisanally made aguardiente is commonly called punta, "puro" or trago, and alcohol content can vary widely, from "mild" puntas of about 10% to "strong" of about 40% or higher. The traditional distillation process produces aguardiente as strong as 60 g/L. Every Ecuadorian province has a slightly different flavor to the aguardiente made there, and each province has a different recipe for canelazo. In Ecuador, aguardiente is the most commonly consumed strong alcohol.

=== Mexico ===
In Mexico, aguardiente goes by many names, including habanero. In the state of Michoacán, charanda is a traditional rum-like sugar cane aguardiente.

Casa Berreteaga marketed an aguardiente called "Berreteaga", which used sugarcane sourced from the Coxcatlan region of Puebla. Berreteaga was a fortified wine made from rum and sweet wine (usually Muscat) or (uncommonly) a sweet brandy that was then aged in oak barrels.

=== Portugal ===
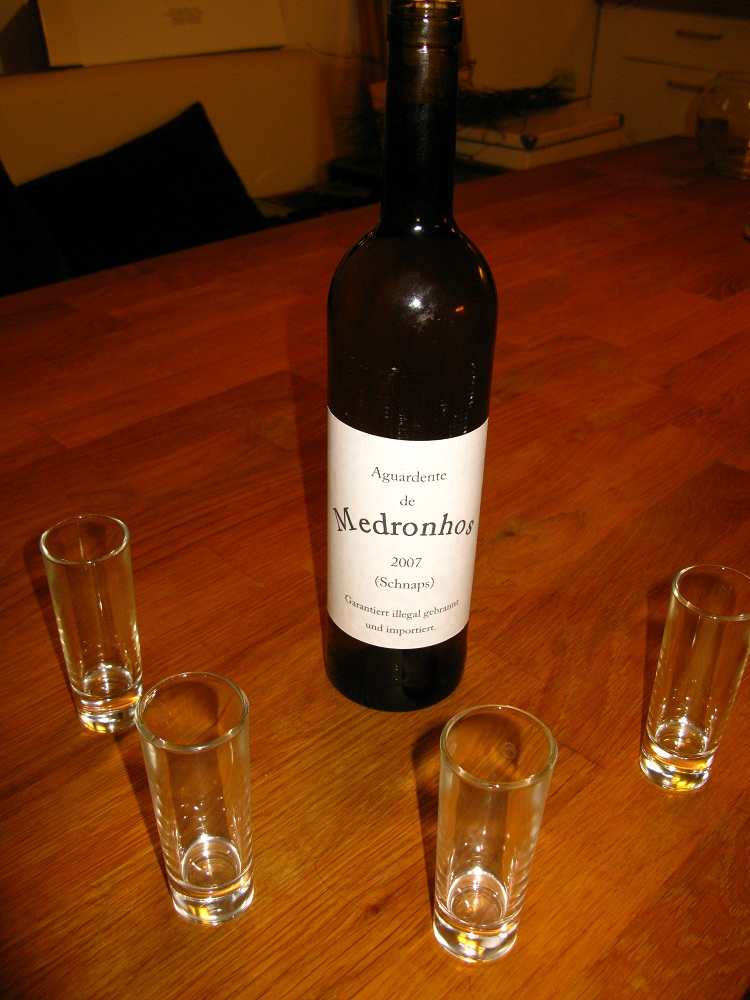
Home-made aguardente de Medronhos

Portuguese aguardente has several varieties. Aguardente vínica is distilled from either good quality or undrinkable wine. It is mostly used to fortify wines such as port or aged to make aguardente velha (old burning water), a kind of brandy. Aguardente bagaceira (mostly known as "bagaço") is made from pomace to prevent waste after the close of wine season. It is usually bootlegged, as most drinkers only appreciate it in its traditional formulation of 50% to 80% ABV. A common way to drink it is as café com cheirinho ("coffee with a little scent"), a liqueur coffee made with espresso.

In the Azores, this espresso-aguardente combination is commonly referred to as café com música ("coffee with music"). Aguardente Medronho is a variety distilled from the fruit of the Arbutus unedo tree.

In Madeira, it is the core ingredient for poncha, a beverage around which a festival is based. Most of the aguardente from the region is made from sugarcane.

=== Spain ===
In certain areas of the Pyrenees in Catalonia, aiguardent, as it is known in Catalan, is used as an essential ingredient in the preparation of tupí, a type of cheese.

Galicia is renowned for the quality and variety of its augardentes (Galician), or aguardientes (Spanish), including augardente de bagazo (aguardiente de Orujo), which is obtained from the distillation of the pomace of grapes, and is clear and colorless. It typically contains over 50% alcohol, sometimes significantly more, and is still made traditionally in many villages across Galicia today. Augardente de herbas, usually yellow, is a sweet liqueur made with augardente de bagazo and herbs (herbas), with chamomile being a substantial ingredient. Licor café (typical distilled drink in the province of Ourense), black in color, is a sweet liqueur made with augardente de bagazo, coffee (café), and sugar. Crema de augardente or crema de caña is a cream liqueur based on augardente, coffee, cream, milk, and other ingredients. It is similar to Irish cream liqueur. In some places in Galicia, a small glass is traditionally taken at breakfast as a tonic before a hard day's work on the land. The word "orujo" is Spanish and not Galician, but is used to distinguish Galician and some Spanish augardentes from those of other countries. "Bagazo" is the Galician for "Orujo".

Most of the moonshine in Spain is made as a byproduct of winemaking by distilling the squeezed skins of the grapes. The essential product is called "orujo" or "aguardiente" (burning water). The homemade versions are usually more potent and have a higher alcoholic content, well over the 40% that the commercial versions typically have. It is often mixed with herbs, spices, fruits, or other distillates. Types include pacharán, licor de café and orujo de hierbas (tea mixed with orujo).

=== United States ===
During the mission and rancho periods of California history, aguardiente was made out of mission grapes. It was popular during the Gold Rush of 1849.

== See also ==
- Schnapps
