= Barraquito =

Spanish coffee liqueur

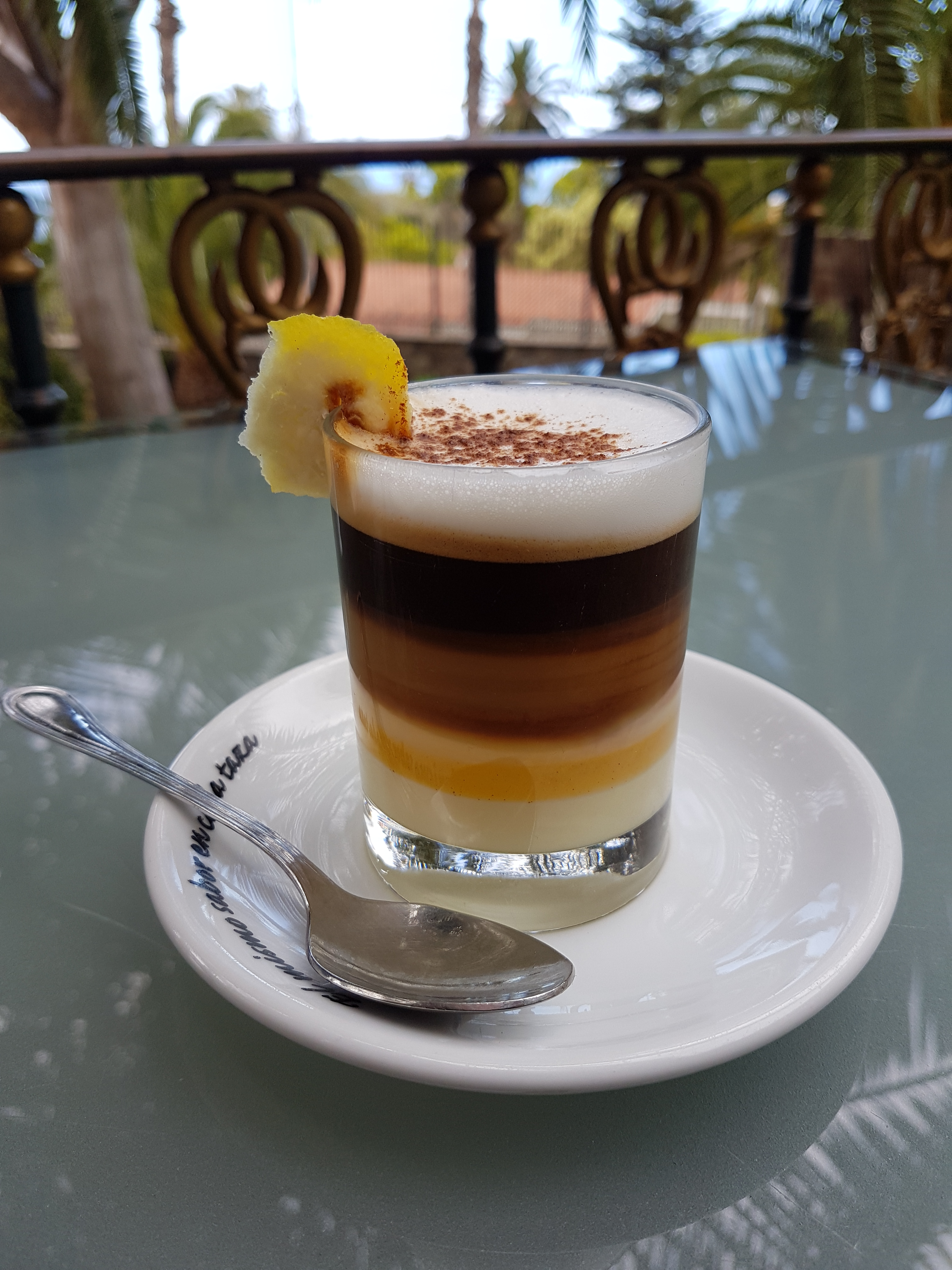
- A barraquito served in La Orotava
- Type: Coffee liqueur
- Region or state: Tenerife, Canary Islands

Barraquito (Spanish pronunciation: [bara'kito]) is a coffee liqueur commonly available on Tenerife (one of the Canary Islands), also known as zaperoco.

== Origin ==
Amongst the population of Santa Cruz de Tenerife, it is said that barraquito appeared in the mid-20th century. Its name refers to a frequent client of Bar Imperial, Don Sebastián Rubio, nicknamed "Barraco" or "Barraquito", who always asked for a cortado with condensed milk, a shot of Licor 43, a lemon rind, and cinnamon in a long glass. This bar is still active and is located in Santa Cruz de Tenerife.

Other sources suggest the drink originated at Bar Paragüitas, also in Santa Cruz, or was invented by a waiter named Manolo Grijalbo at a kiosk near the city's port, which served as a meeting point for artists and students.

In December 2021, following the volcanic eruption on La Palma, the Baristas Association of Murcia promoted a campaign to temporarily rename their local 'café asiático' to 'barraquito', donating the proceeds to help those affected by the eruption.

== Description ==
The barraquito is a multi-layered coffee liqueur drink (though non-liqueur versions are available) normally served in a glass to enable easy viewing of the different layers.

== Variants ==
- Barraquito Especial: In the metropolitan area of Santa Cruz de Tenerife and La Laguna, the term barraquito often refers to a simple coffee with condensed milk and regular milk (known elsewhere as 'leche-leche'). Therefore, the full layered version with liqueur, cinnamon, and lemon is specifically ordered as Barraquito Especial.
- Barraquito vírgen or alcohol free: this omits the liqueur, so it is simply coffee with milk with cinnamon and lemon.

== Ingredients ==
The layers of a barraquito are normally:

- Coffee
- Licor 43 (or Tía María)
- Frothed milk
- Condensed milk

Other ingredients typically used:

- Lemon peel
- Cinnamon

== Preparation ==
The condensed milk is first added, followed by the liqueur, espresso and lemon peel (in this order). Milk (can be frothed by any means available) is then added and cinnamon is sprinkled on top.

== Regional variations ==
The barraquito is often known as a zaperoco in northern areas of Tenerife (such as Puerto de la Cruz and Buenavista). In some menus, Barraquito might be served without alcohol, while Zaperoco is served with alcohol, though this varies by establishment.
