= Licor 43 =

Spanish liqueur brand

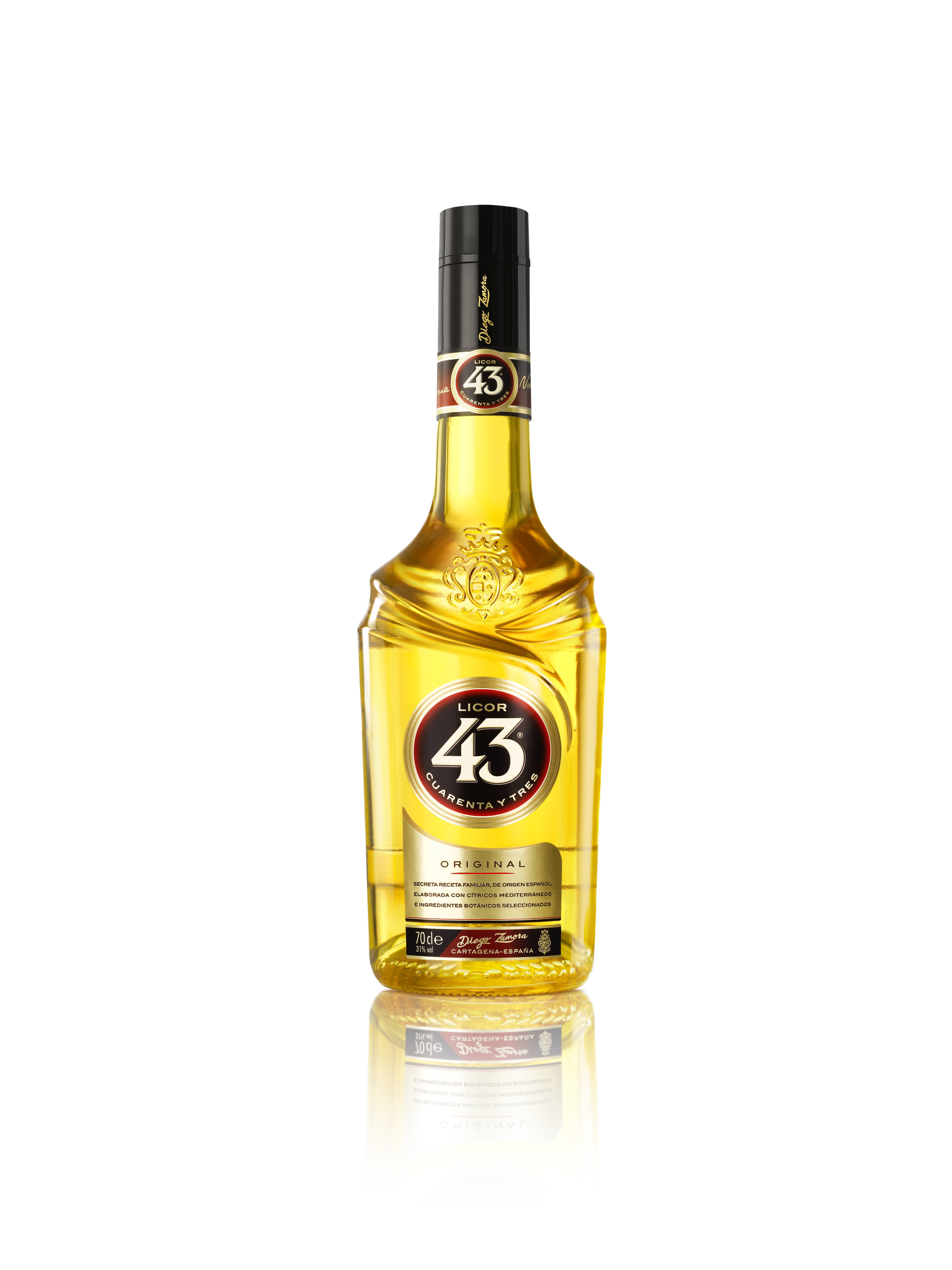
- Type: Private
- Industry: Distilled beverages
- Founded: 1924
- Headquarters: Cartagena, Spain (main)
- Products: Liqueurs
- Parent: Zamora Company
- Website: www.licor43.com

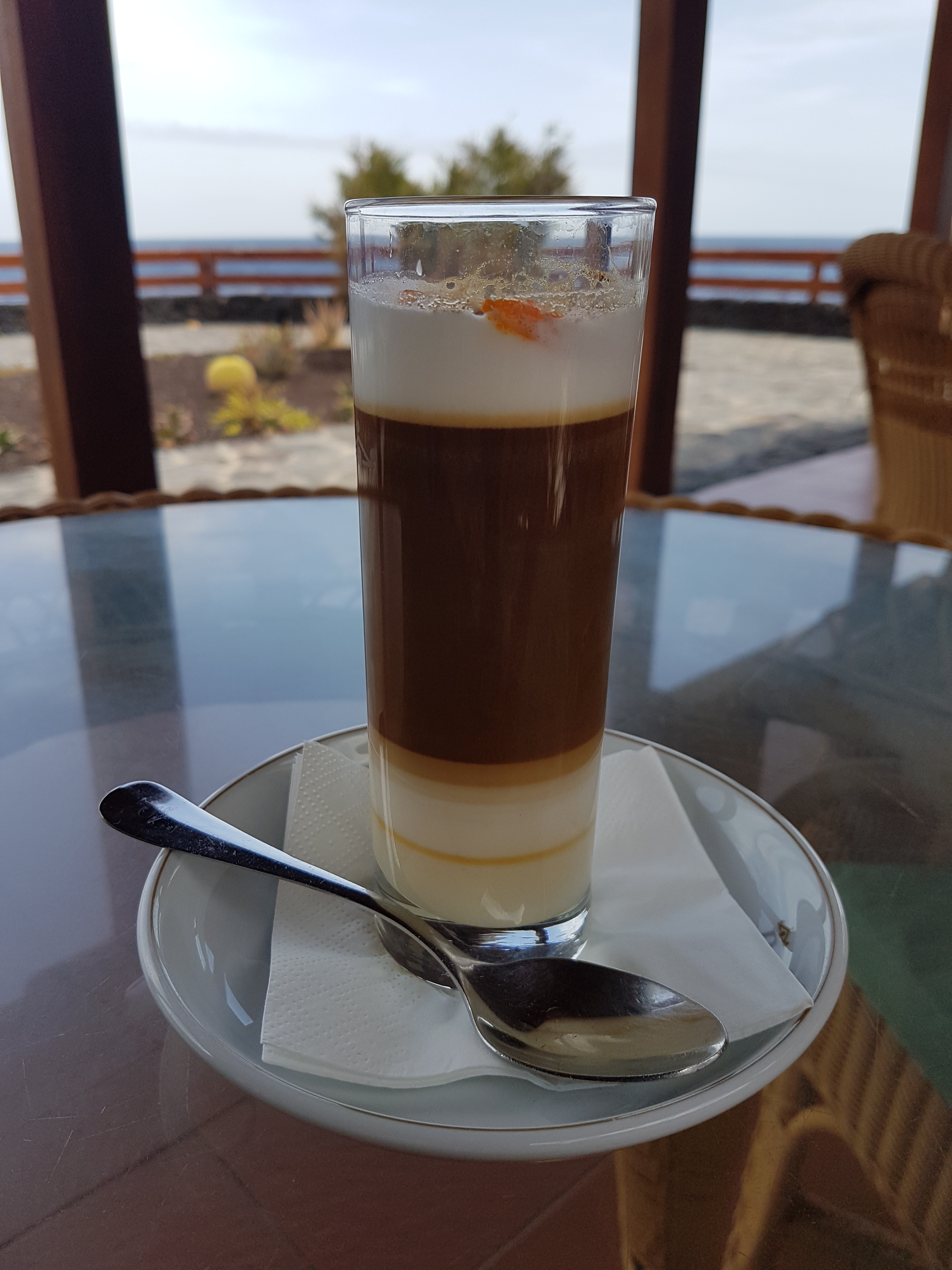
Typical coffee drink of the Spanish Canary Islands which is a mixture of espresso, milk and Licor 43

Licor 43, or Cuarenta y Tres (Spanish for '43'), is a liqueur made in Cartagena, Spain.

== History ==
Licor 43 was invented in 1946 by the siblings Diego, Angel, and Josefina Zamora, along with Emilio Restoy, Josefina's husband. The Licor 43 website states they based their recipe on the Liqvor Mirabilis (marvelous liquid), a golden, aromatic elixir produced and infused from local fruits and herbs in Carthago Nova during the 3rd century BCE. Liqvor Mirabilis was encountered by the Romans, when they conquered the region in 209 BC; despite the Romans banning its production and consumption, the Carthaginians continued producing in secret. This legend served as the inspiration for the Zamoras' invention of Licor 43.

The name of the modern-day liqueur comes from its use of 43 different ingredients; while its recipe is a secret, it is known to contain citrus and fruit juices and to be flavored with vanilla, among other aromatic herbs and spices. It contains 31% alcohol by volume.

== Sales ==
As of 2011, it was the fastest growing premium liqueur in the world in its category, and is present in more than 60 countries. During a 2015 inquiry into the best-selling alcohols in The World's 50 Best Bars (the bar version of William Reed's The World's 50 Best Restaurants), Licor 43 was ranked as the 9th best-selling digestif worldwide. According to the International Wines and Spirits Record (IWSR), a data analytics company that tracks alcoholic beverage trends and measures country, category, and brand performance, Licor 43 was the fastest growing liquor of scale globally in 2017.

== Uses and variations ==
Mexican carajillos, which specifically calls for "licor del 43" as the alcohol combined with espresso and ice. In the Canary Islands, it is an essential ingredient for a barraquito, a variant of the highly popular cortado condensada (espresso with condensed milk) coffee.

A "mini-beer" is a Licor 43 cocktail designed to visually imitate a beer. A miniature pint glass is mostly filled with Licor 43 and topped with a chilled dairy-based liquid, such as heavy cream or Irish Cream. The color of Licor 43 mimics the amber color of a pale beer, and the dairy product mimics the white color of a beer's foamy head. A common cocktail variation in Mexico is the “Sandrillo, which includes Licor 43 shaken with whole milk.
