= Carajillo =

Spanish drink combining coffee with alcohol

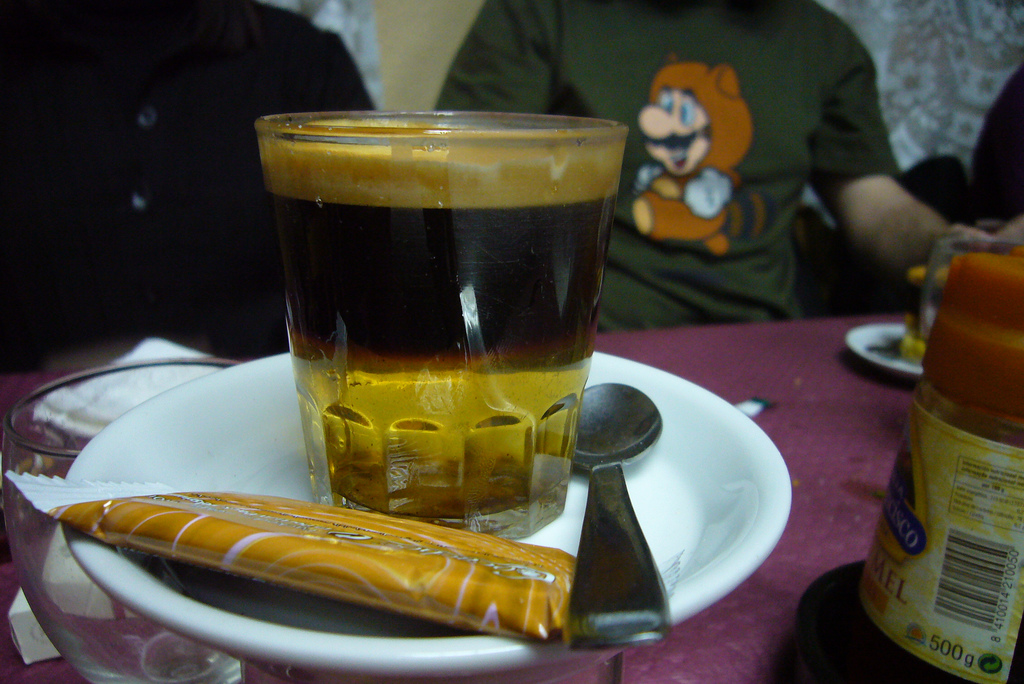
- Unmixed Carajillo on a plate
- Region of origin: Unknown, Possibly Cuba

A carajillo (Spanish: [kaɾaˈxiʝo, kaɾaˈxiʎo]) is an alcoholic drink made with coffee and either brandy, rum, mezcal or coffee liqueur. The drink is prominent in Spain and Latin America and is typically served in a small glass.

Similar to Irish coffee or caffè corretto, Carajillo is common in Colombia and Venezuela where it is made with brandy; Cuba, where it is made with rum; and Mexico where it is made with mezcal or a coffee liqueur, e.g., Kahlúa, Tía María or Licor 43.

Variations may include spices, e.g., cinnamon or fruit such as lemon peel.

In Costa Rica, the carajillo was consumed in the 50's thru the 70's as an after dinner drink. Gentlemen would order a brandy (served in a snifter) and a black coffee on the side. They would then proceed to pour the hot coffee into the snifter. The coffee and brandy aromas would blend, and the heat from the coffee helped vaporize them.

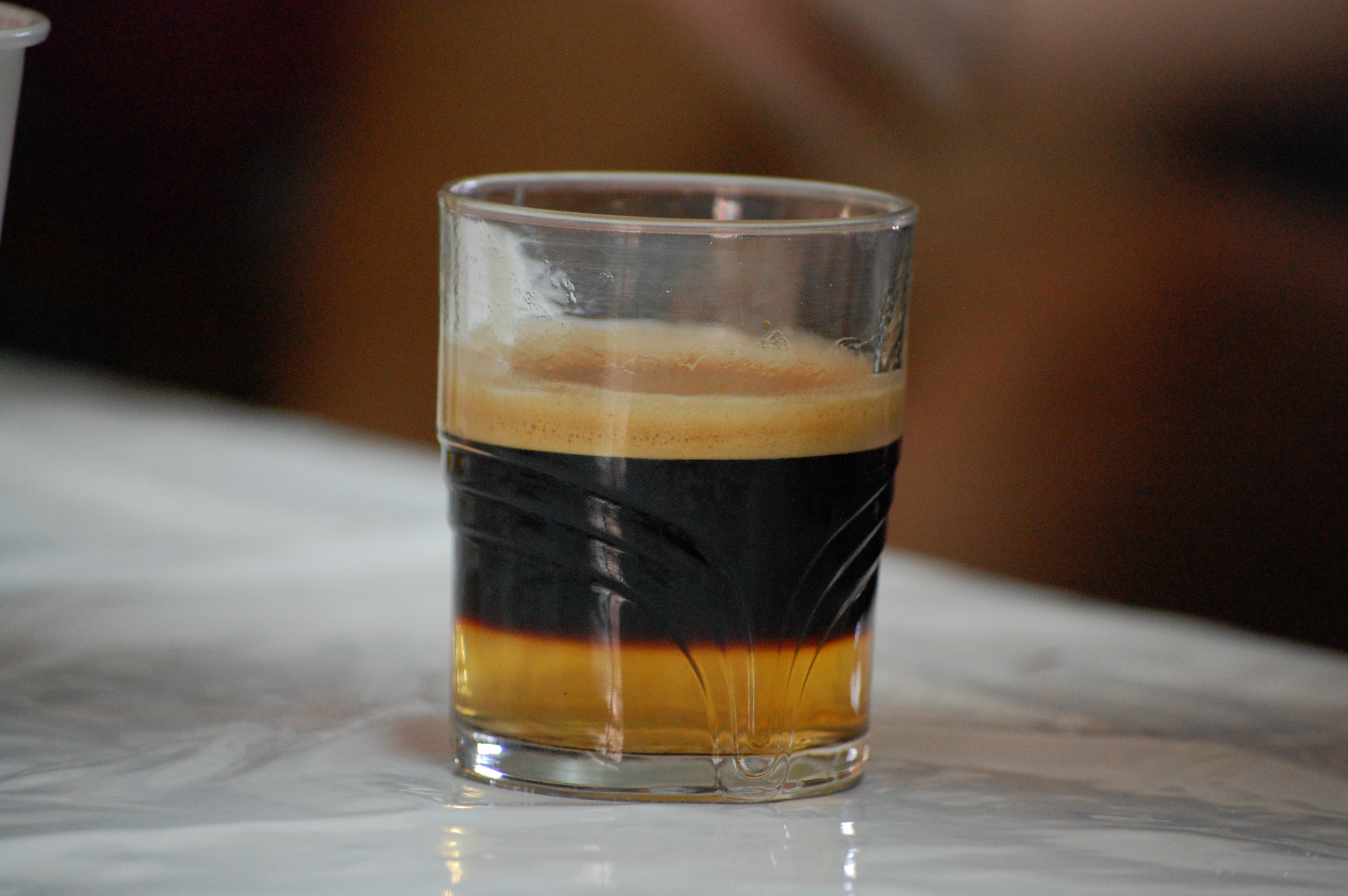
Carajillo, unmixed

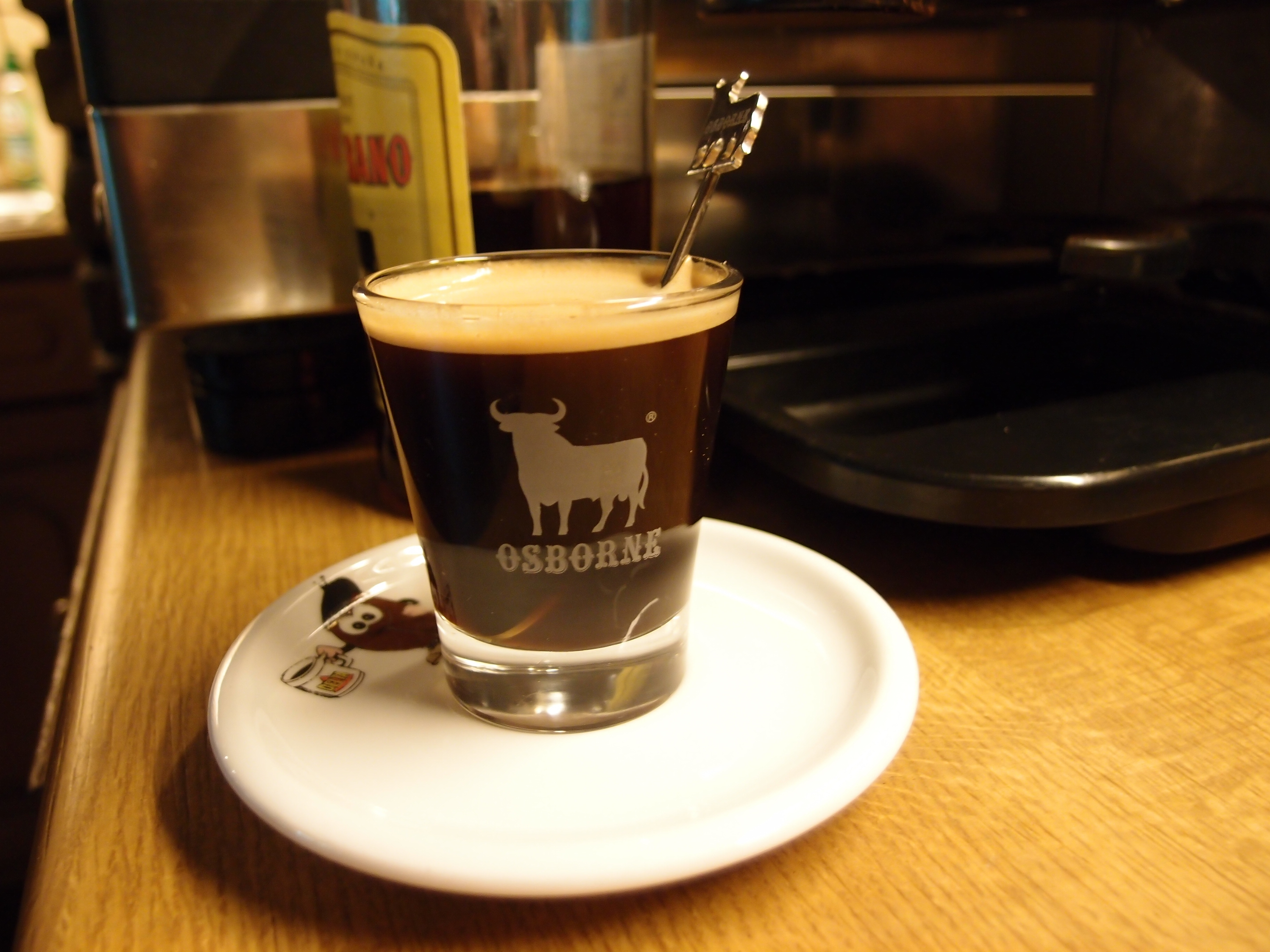
Carajillo in an Osborne bull glass

== See also ==
- Irish coffee – cocktail with coffee and whiskey
