= French coffee maker =

French coffee maker may refer to:

- French drip, a coffee preparation method also known as cafetière du Belloy
- French press, a coffee preparation method also known as cafetière à piston
- French pull, a variant of the French press method, where a filter is pulled rather than pressed

== See also ==
- French coffee (disambiguation)
