= Mustang coffee =

Mustang coffee is a liqueur coffee consisting of coffee, sugar or honey, butter, and raksi (a Nepalese rice or millet wine). It is made by browning rakshi and butter and adding sugar.

Various other spirits can be used to make Mustang coffee, including Khukuri rum. The Nomad Lounge at Disneyworld serves a variant made with Crown Royal.

Mustang coffee is named after the Mustang district of Nepal.
