= Sambuca =

Italian anise-flavored liqueur

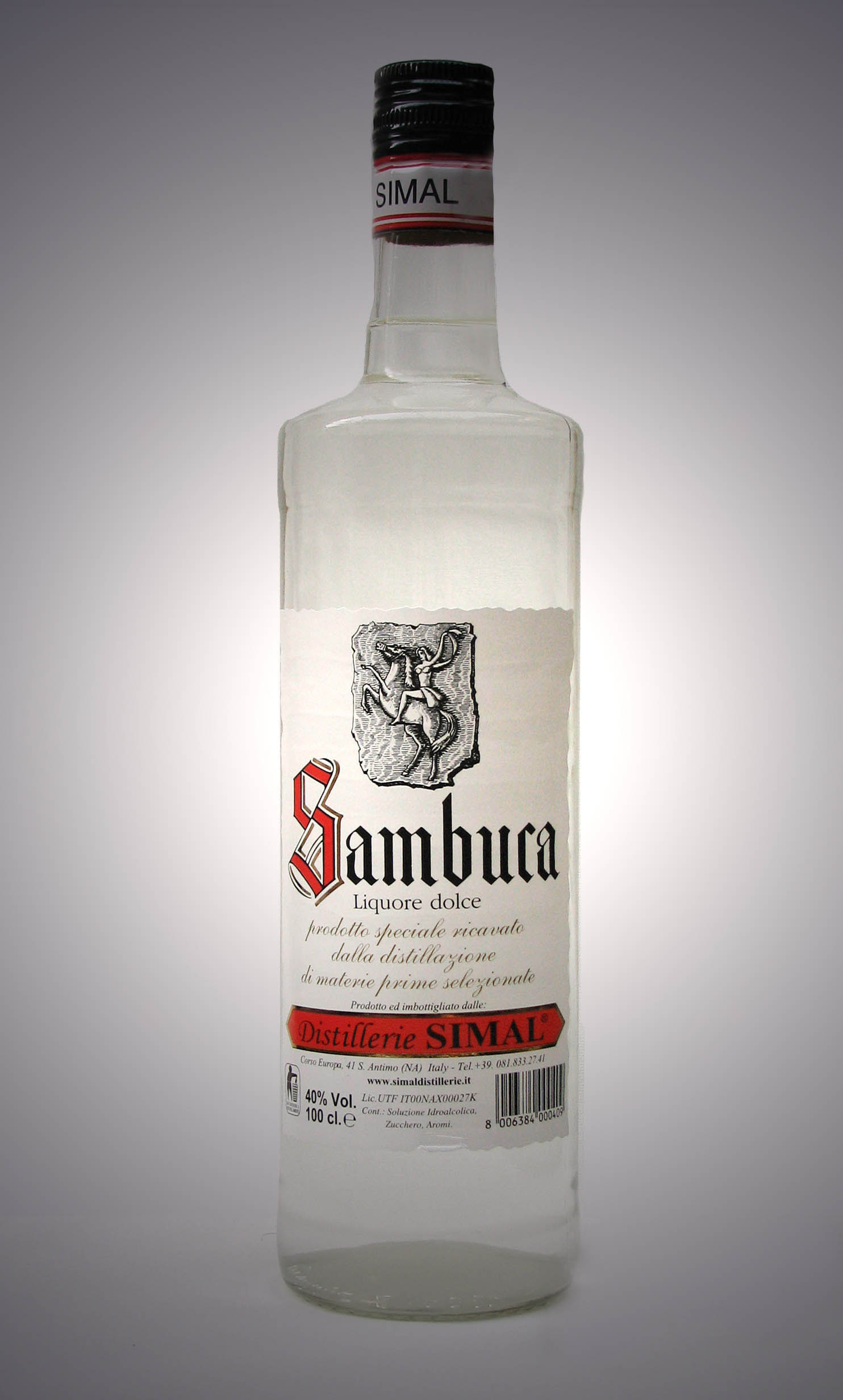
A 100cl bottle of sambuca

Sambuca (Italian: [samˈbuːka]) is an Italian anise-flavoured liqueur. Its most common variety is often referred to as "white sambuca" to differentiate it from other varieties that are deep blue ("black sambuca") or bright red ("red sambuca"). Like other anise-flavoured liqueurs, the ouzo effect is sometimes observed when combined with water.

== Ingredients ==
Sambuca is flavoured with essential oils obtained from star anise, or less commonly, green anise. Other spices such as elderflower, liquorice and others may be included but are not required as per the legal definition. It is bottled at a minimum of 38% alc/vol. The oils are added to pure alcohol, a concentrated solution of sugar, and other flavours.

== History ==
The term comes from the Latin word sambucus, meaning 'elderberry'. The word sambuca was first used as the name of another elderberry liquor that was created in Civitavecchia around 1850 by Luigi Manzi.

== Serving ==
Sambuca may be served neat. It may also be served on the rocks or with water, resulting in the ouzo effect from the anethole in the anise. Like other anise liqueurs, it may be consumed after coffee as an ammazzacaffè (Italian: "coffee-killer") or added directly to coffee in place of sugar to produce a caffè corretto (Italian: "corrected coffee").

A serving of sambuca can be a shot with seven coffee beans, representing the seven hills of Rome. Likewise, a shot with one coffee bean, called con la mosca, (Italian: "with the fly"), is as common. The traditional serving is with three coffee beans, each representing health, happiness and prosperity. The shot may be ignited to toast the coffee beans with the flame extinguished immediately before drinking.

Sambuca is also used in cooking, in small amounts because it has a strong flavour. It is usually used in desserts and seafood recipes.

== See also ==
Media related to Sambuca at Wikimedia Commons

- List of anise-flavored liqueurs
