= Asbach Uralt =

German brand of brandy

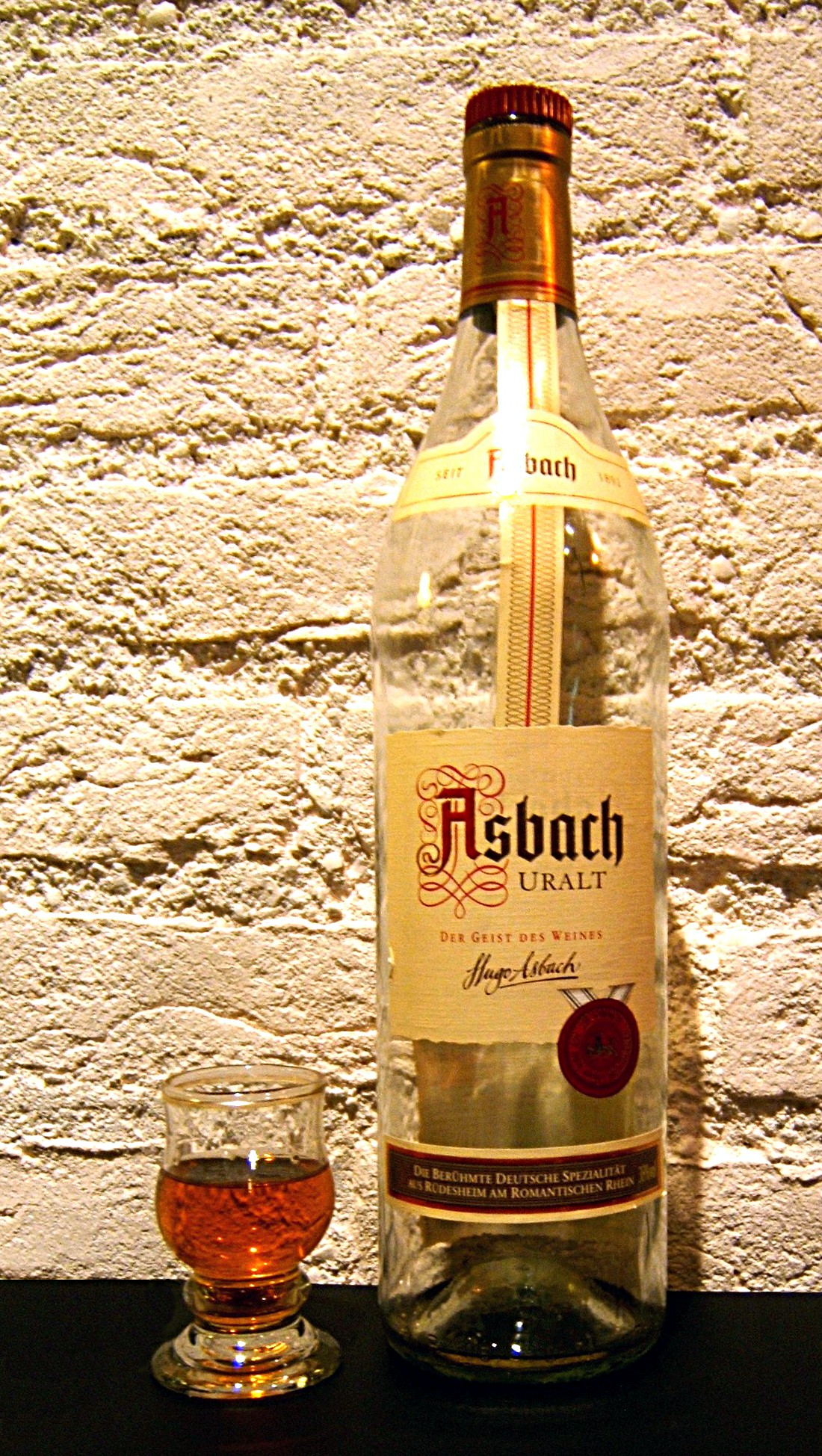
- Type: Brandy
- Manufacturer: Underberg
- Country of origin: Germany
- Website: Asbach Uralt website

Asbach Uralt is a German brandy produced by the company Asbach GmbH, a subsidiary of Underberg AG, which also makes other spirits and chocolate. Its history dates back to 1892 when Hugo Asbach (1868–1935) founded the company in the town of Rüdesheim am Rhein.

Asbach, a native from Cologne, learned the distillery trade at the local "Export-Company for German Cognac" and further improved his knowledge in France. He founded his own company on 11 May 1892, distributing domestic "Rüdesheim Cognac" which soon became popular. After World War I, when the Treaty of Versailles decreed that the word Cognac could only be used for French products, Hugo Asbach coined the term Weinbrand for German brandy, which in 1923 became an official classification according to German wine law.

From 1924, Asbach also distributed brandy filled pralines ("brandy beans") to address new customer demographics. The coffee drink Rüdesheimer Kaffee, invented in 1957, contains Asbach as its alcoholic ingredient. Up to today, Asbach Uralt is one of the best-known German brandy trademarks. As a long drink, it is often mixed with Cola products; especially in traditional pubs in the Berlin area, where it is served as Futschi.
