= Irish coffee =

Drink containing coffee, whiskey and whipped cream

Irish Coffee
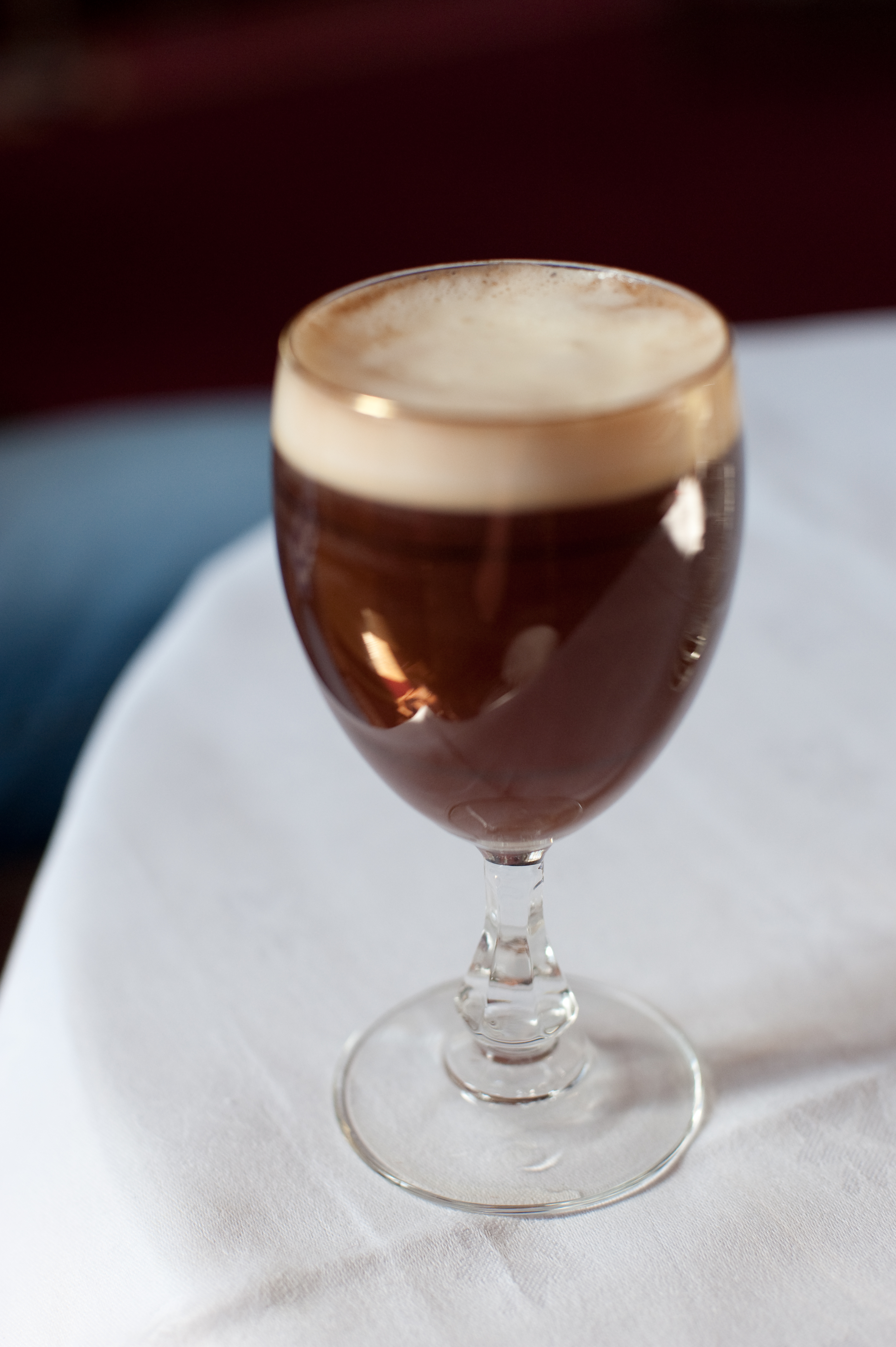
- Traditional Irish coffee
- Type: Mixed drink
- Ingredients: 50 ml (1.7 US fl oz) Irish whiskey; 120 ml (4.1 US fl oz) hot coffee; 50 ml (1.7 US fl oz) fresh cream (chilled); 4.929 ml (1 tsp) sugar
- Base spirit: Irish whiskey
- Standard drinkware: Irish coffee mug
- Served: Hot
- Preparation: Pour the coffee into a preheated glass, add whiskey and sugar, and stir until dissolved. Pour cream slowly to form a distinct layer.

Irish coffee (Irish: caife Gaelach) is a caffeinated alcoholic drink consisting of Irish whiskey, hot coffee and sugar, which has been stirred and topped with cream (sometimes cream liqueur). The coffee is drunk through the cream.

== Origin ==
Different variations of coffee cocktails pre-date the now-classic Irish coffee by at least 100 years.

In 19th-century France, a mixture of coffee and spirits was called a gloria.

- "Un trait de son caractère était de payer généreusement quinze francs par mois pour le gloria qu'il prenait au dessert." (Balzac, Le Père Goriot, 1834, I.)
- "Il aimait le gros cidre, les gigots saignants, les glorias longuement battus." (Flaubert, Madame Bovary, 1857.)

Several places claim to have developed the modern recipe in the 1950s. One version is attributed to a Joe Sheridan, head chef at the restaurant and coffee shop in the Foynes Airbase flying boat terminal (about 15 kilometres or 9.3 miles from present-day Shannon Airport, County Clare). In 1942 or 1943, he added whiskey to the coffee of some disembarking passengers.

Stanton Delaplane, a travel writer for the San Francisco Chronicle, maintains he drank Irish coffee at Shannon Airport and he worked with the Buena Vista Cafe in San Francisco to start serving it on November 10, 1952. Sheridan later emigrated to work at the Buena Vista Cafe.

== Preparation ==
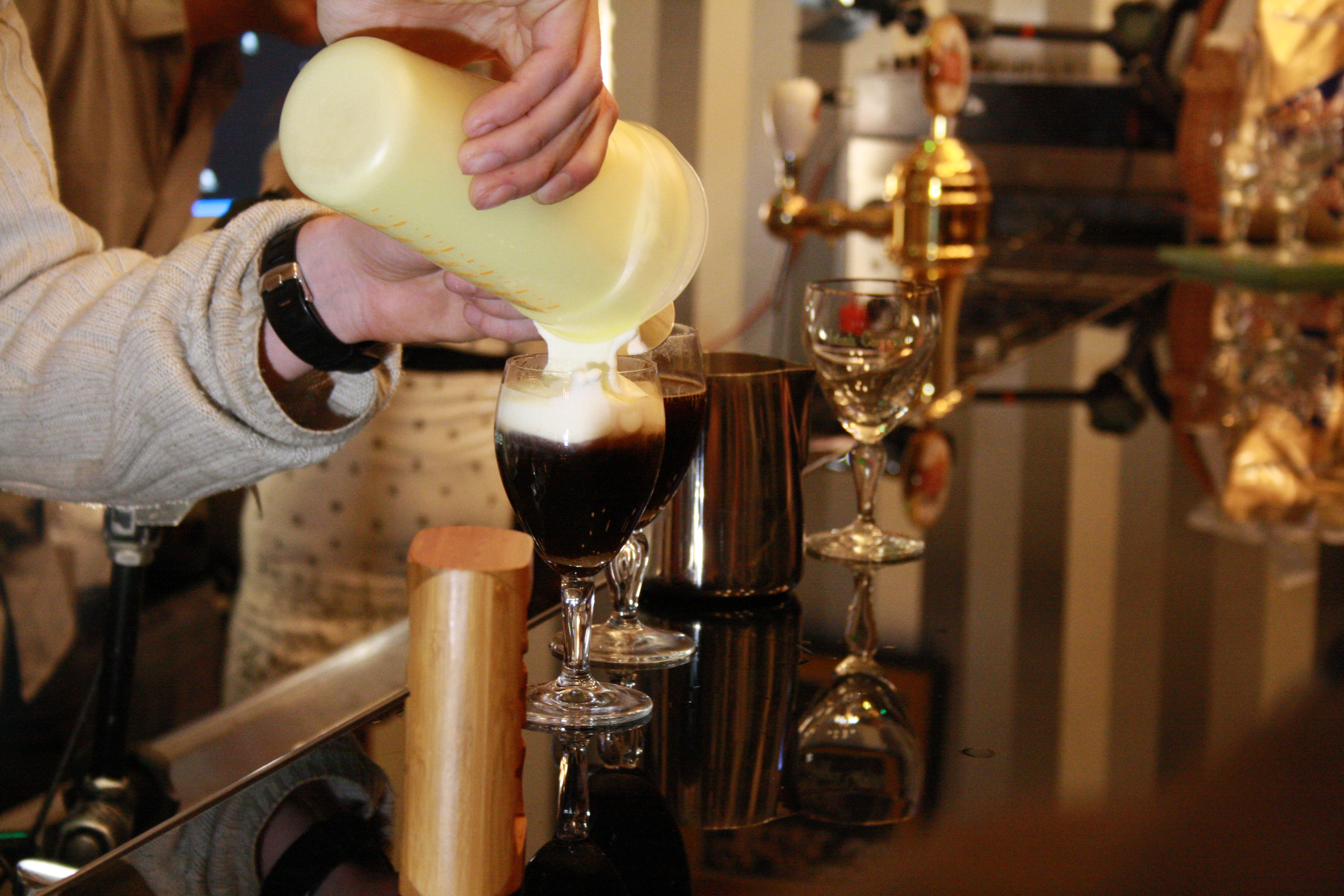
One method of adding the cream

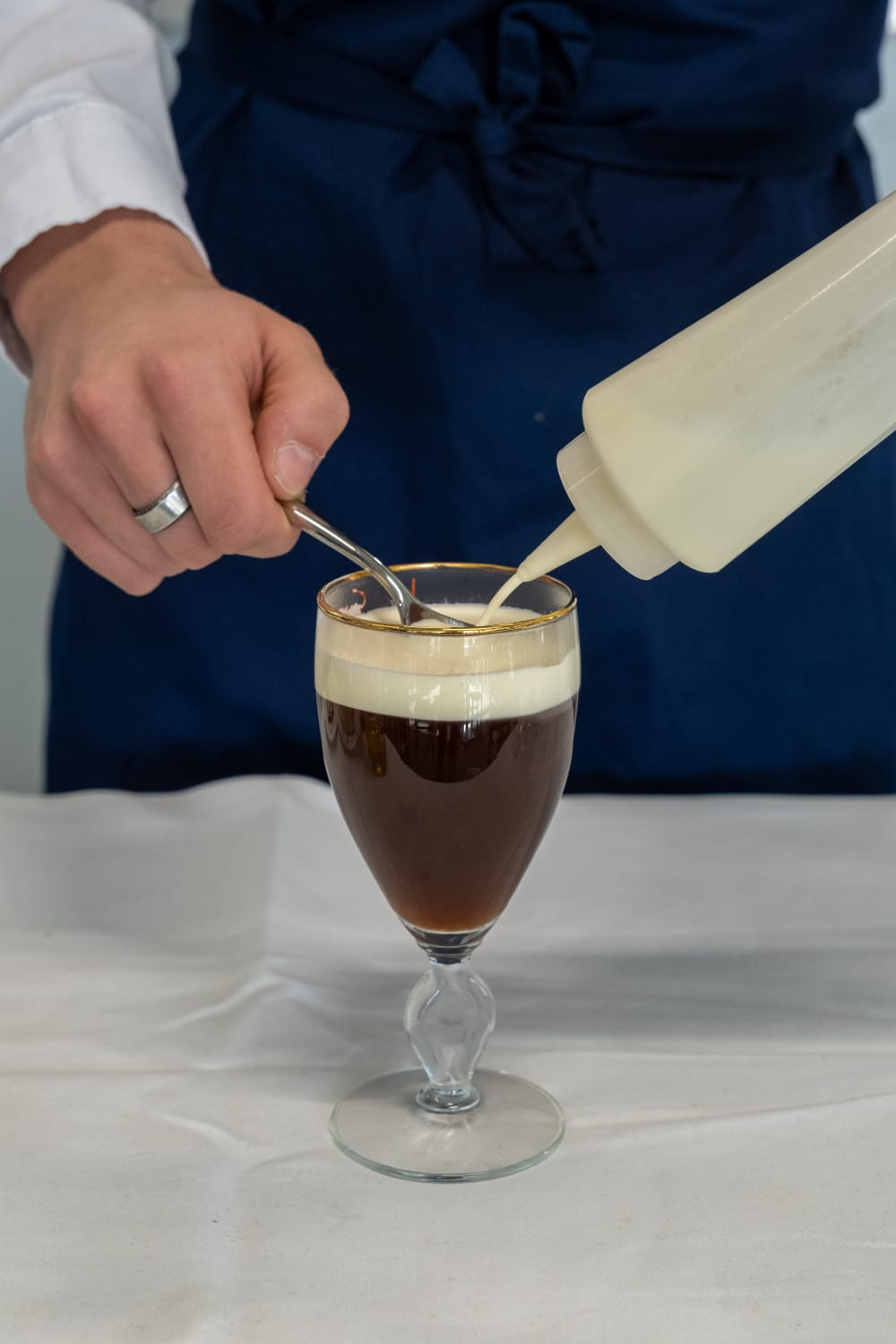
Gently running the cream over a spoon

Irish whiskey and at least one level teaspoon of sugar are poured over black coffee and stirred in until fully dissolved. Thick cream is carefully poured over the back of a spoon initially held just above the surface of the coffee and gradually raised a little until the entire layer is floated.

== Variations ==
In 1988, the National Standards Authority of Ireland published Irish Standard I.S. 417: Irish Coffee. The standard has been cancelled at least as of 2020. (Note: The standard can be obtained from Standards IE.)

Although whiskey, coffee and cream are the basic ingredients in all Irish coffee, there are variations in preparation: the choice of coffee and the methods used for brewing it differ significantly. The use of espresso machines or fully automatic coffee brewers is now typical: the coffee is either a caffè americano (espresso diluted with hot water) or some kind of filter coffee, often made using a coffee capsule.

In Spain, Irish coffee (café irlandés) is sometimes served with a bottom layer of whiskey, a separate coffee layer, and a layer of cream on top; special devices are sold for making it.

Some bars in Southeast Asia serve a cocktail of iced coffee and whiskey, sometimes without cream, under the name "Irish coffee". Ethan Ha's Bar in Hanoi has popularized this variation in the region.

Many drinks of hot coffee with a distilled spirit, and cream floated on top—liqueur coffees—are given names derived from Irish coffee, although the names are not standardised. Irish cream coffee (also known as Baileys coffee) can be considered a variant of Irish coffee, but involves the use of Irish cream as a "pre-mixed" substitute for the whisky, cream and sugar. Jamaican coffee would be expected to be made with rum; Highland coffee, also called Gaelic coffee, with Scotch whisky; Russian coffee with vodka; and Mexican coffee with tequila.

A craft cocktail bar in New York City known for their Irish coffee, The Dead Rabbit, has made variants by combining said cocktail with a martini and brandy Alexander, along with making a frozen variety.

== See also ==
- List of coffee drinks
- List of hot beverages
- Caffeinated alcoholic drink
- Rüdesheimer Kaffee
- Liqueur coffee
