= Rüdesheimer Kaffee =

German alcoholic coffee drink

- Type: Mixed drink
- Ingredients: 125 ml hot, black coffee; 3 cubes of sugar; 4 cl Asbach Uralt brandy, or cognac, or armagnac; Whipped cream sweetened with vanilla sugar; Dark chocolate shavings for sprinkling
- Standard drinkware: Irish coffee mug
- Standard garnish: Chocolate flakes
- Served: Hot
- Preparation: Flambée brandy and sugar in Rüdesheimer cup to dissolve sugar. Add hot coffee and top with whipped cream; garnish.

Rüdesheimer Kaffee is an alcoholic coffee drink from Rüdesheim am Rhein in Germany invented in 1957 by the German television chef Hans Karl Adam. It is a popular drink in coffee houses.

Asbach Uralt brandy and sugar cubes are added to a cup. In Rüdesheim, a cup that is specially designed for this beverage is used. The brandy is flambéed and stirred for a minute until the sugar dissolves. Strong coffee is added, followed by a topping of thickly whipped cream sweetened with vanilla sugar. Chocolate flakes are scattered onto the cream as a garnish.

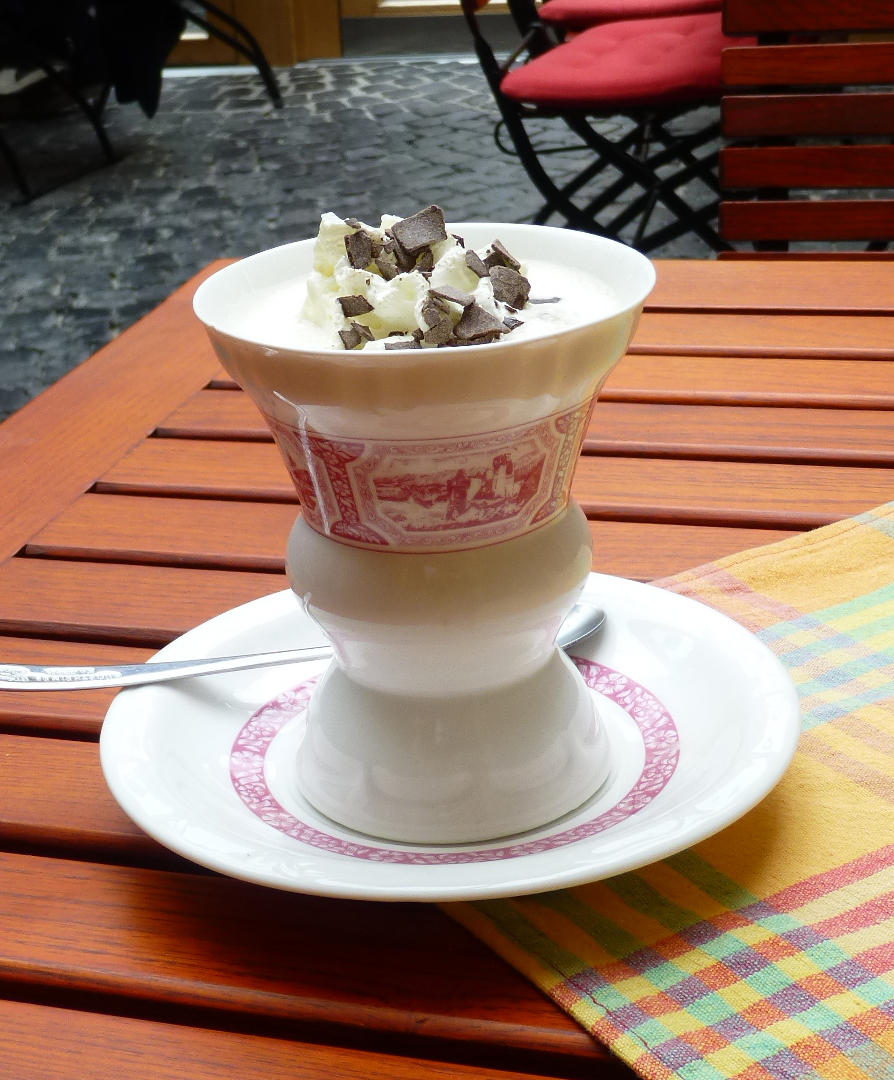
The special café as served in Rüdesheim in 2014

External images
- 1. Cup of Rüdesheimer Kaffee
- 2. Preparing to flambée the brandy
- 3. A Rüdesheimer Kaffee cup

== See also ==
- Irish coffee
- List of coffee beverages
