= Café com cheirinho =

Portuguese coffee and liquor drink

Café com cheirinho (lit. 'coffee with a scent') or bica com cheirinho is a Portuguese coffee with added alcohol (wine, aguardente, bagaço or medronho). Occasionally, the spirit can be served on the side. This combination is common during colder seasons, often as a digestif. It is also called a café com música (lit. 'coffee with music') in Madeira and Azores.

== See also ==
- Bica
