= Café gourmand =

Espresso and mignardises

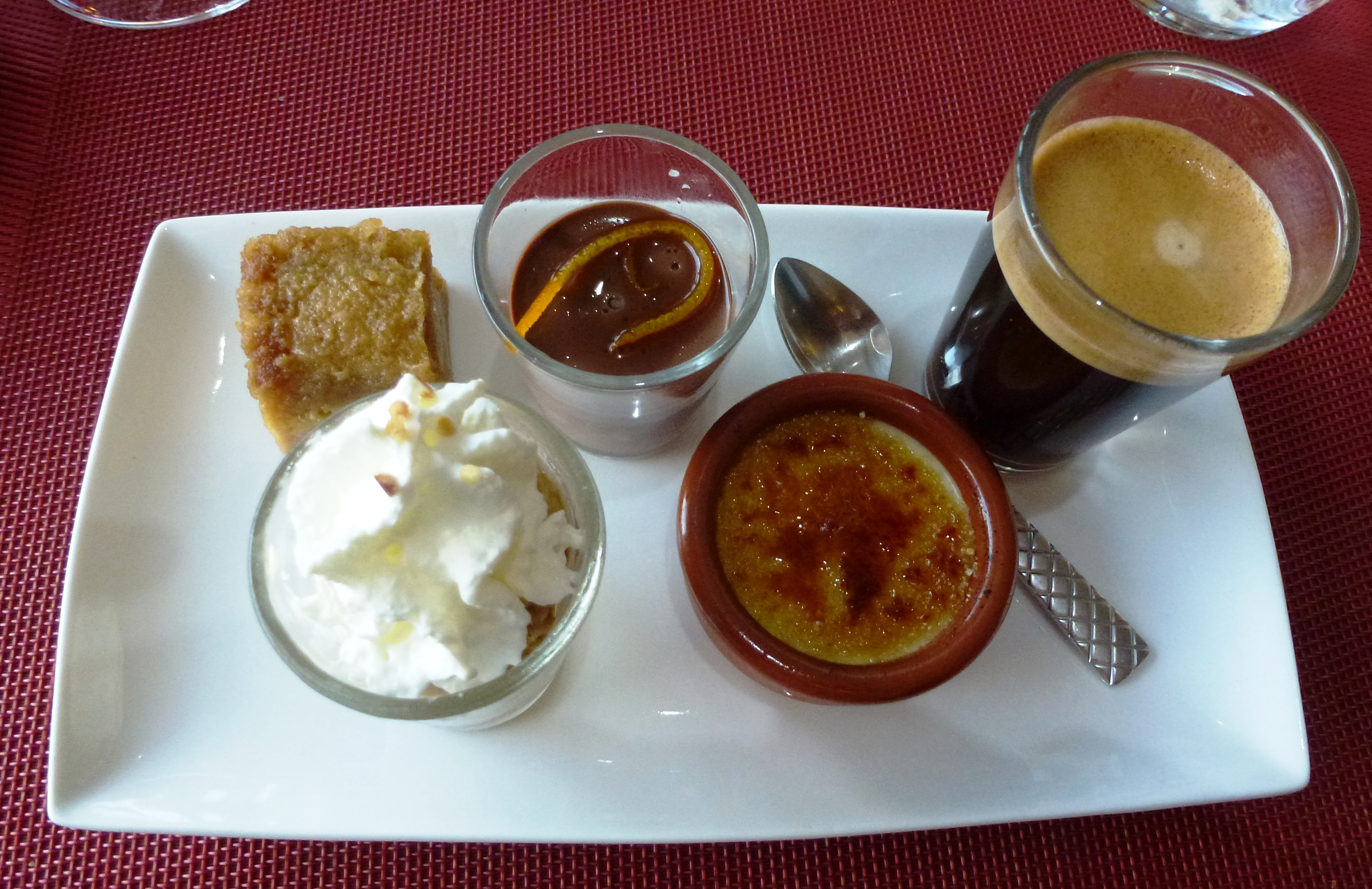
Café gourmand arrangement

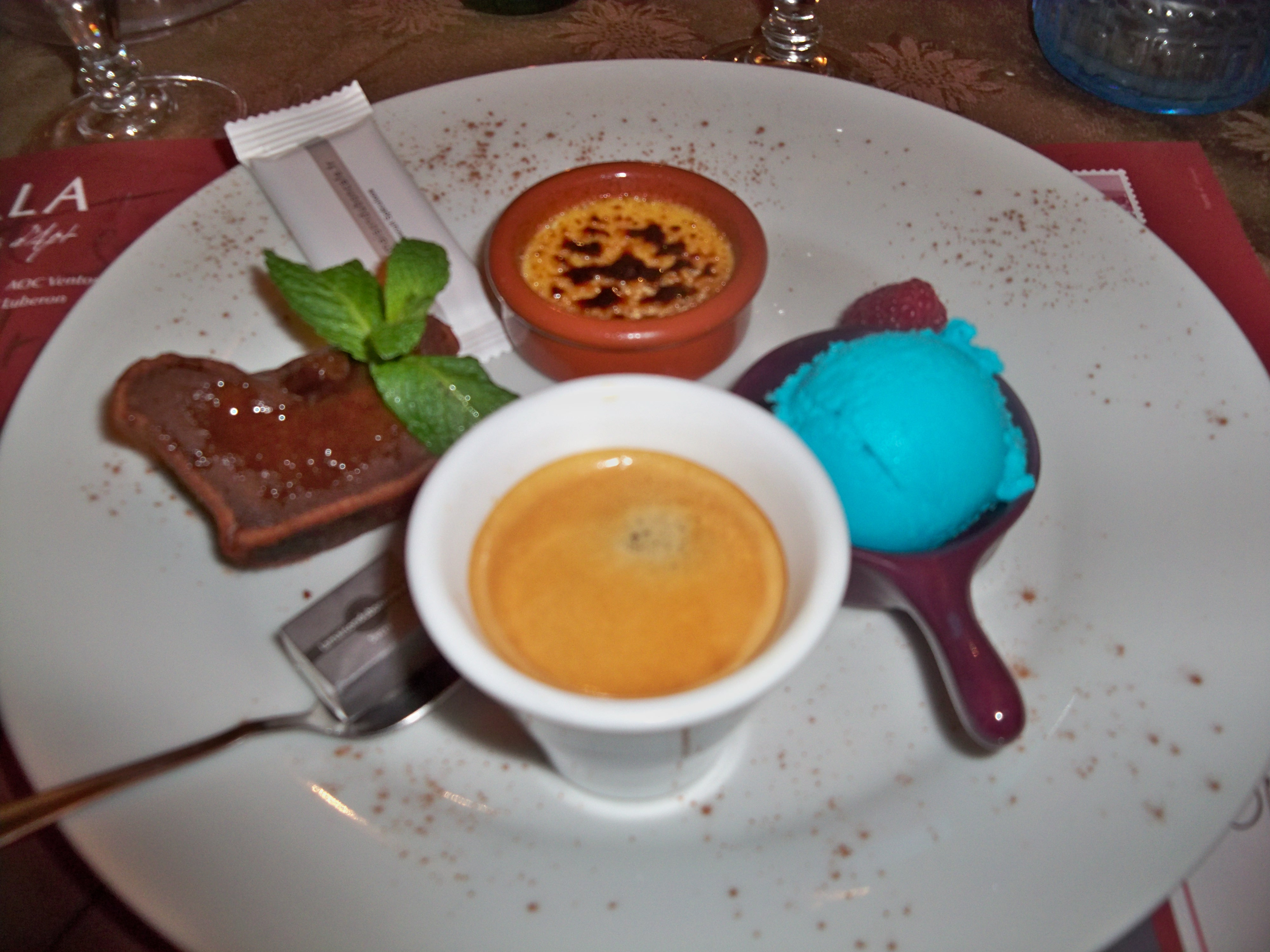
Café gourmand

A café gourmand is a cup of coffee (usually an espresso) served together with a selection of mignardises (also known as petits fours).

== Purpose ==
The concept of "café gourmand" was created in 1985 for the seafood chain restaurant La Criée, inspired by free mignardises offered with an order of coffee at high-end restaurants. There are similarities between "cafés gourmands" and the English tradition of afternoon tea, although the latter is an altogether different occasion.

It is a step further in a general trend, in France, to have lunches in restaurants that are quicker than in the past. Back in the 20th century it was common as a minimum to have a starter, then a main course, then a plate of cheese, then a dessert, then a cup of coffee, and then a digestif. Then the starter ceased to be the accepted norm, and the plate of cheese became scarce, and the digestif disappeared. The "café gourmand" represents a further step, as ordering the dessert and the coffee in one go gains time, avoiding the need to have to call the waiter over to order.

Apart from the gain of time, the "café gourmand" has other advantages:

- It gives the opportunity to eat several different desserts in one go, without feeling guilty for the calories as the quantity of each dessert is supposed to be tiny.
- It allows the diner to sweeten the bitterness of the coffee, by going back & forth between the desserts and the cup of coffee.
- It creates a feeling of mystery and surprise, as the names of the mini-desserts are not indicated on the menu, so that the customer does not know what they will get beforehand.

== Composition ==
While there is no requirement for the composition of a "café gourmand", the desserts most commonly included are chocolate mousse, apple pie, ice cream and crème brûlée.
