= Karsk =

Scandinavian coffee and moonshine cocktail

- Type: Cocktail
- Ingredients: 6cl (3 parts) Pure alcohol; 6cl (3 parts) Hot coffee
- Base spirit: Everclear, Moonshine, Vodka
- Standard drinkware: Coffee cup
- Served: Hot
- Preparation: Heat the coffee; do not boil. Pour into cup and add the alcohol; serve hot.

Karsk (also called kask or kaffeekask, alongside a variety of different names) is Norwegian cocktail (from the Trøndelag region) containing coffee together with moonshine and sometimes a spoon of sugar (enthusiasts often consider moonshine exclusively to be appropriate as an added component, as it has no inherent taste like other alcoholic beverages). Broader, it can also be found in other parts of Scandinavia.

== Etymology ==
The word karsk is derived from the Old Norse adjective karskr, meaning healthy, vigorous or agile.

== Origin ==
The precise origin of karsk is unknown, however it appears to have been a popular drink in the Swedish Bohuslän district in the early 1800s. By the latter half of the century, its popularity spread across Norway. It was and still is especially popular in rural areas, although city-folk also enjoy it. It is firmly embedded as a part of the culture in Trøndelag, and according to former Norwegian Minister of Culture Trond Giske "Everyone who has grown up in Trøndelag, has had Karsk at some point".

== Variations ==
In English-speaking countries, the variant with vodka instead of moonshine is sometimes called Russian coffee, though Russian coffee can also refer to a variant served with whipped cream.

In Norway, the term karsk is predominantly used in the mid-region of the country (Trøndelag, roughly corresponding to the county of Trøndelag), while it may be referred to with other terms in other parts of the country. For instance, it may also be referred to as kaffedoktor ("Coffee doctor") or knikt (Hedmark dialect for knekt (jack/knave)); both these are for instance popular designations in the counties of Hedmark and Oppland (merged to Innlandet after 1 January 2020). In Northern Norway it may also be referred to as rotar, though some would use these terms (kaffedoktor and rotar) exclusively about a variety where sugar is added with the coffee.

In Sweden it is called kask, kaffekask ("strong coffee") or kaffegök and is mainly drunk in the central and northern parts. Even the Southeastern dialect of Finnish has an expression for the beverage, there called kaffeplörö or kaffeblörö.

In Denmark this type of drink is usually called a kaffepunch and traditionally consists of nothing but coffee with schnapps.

The mixing ratio varies.

== Notable karsk aficionados ==
- Trond Giske, Norwegian politician
- Petter Northug, Norwegian cross-country skier
- Bjarne Brøndbo, Norwegian musician
