= Bemelmans Bar =

Cocktail bar in New York City

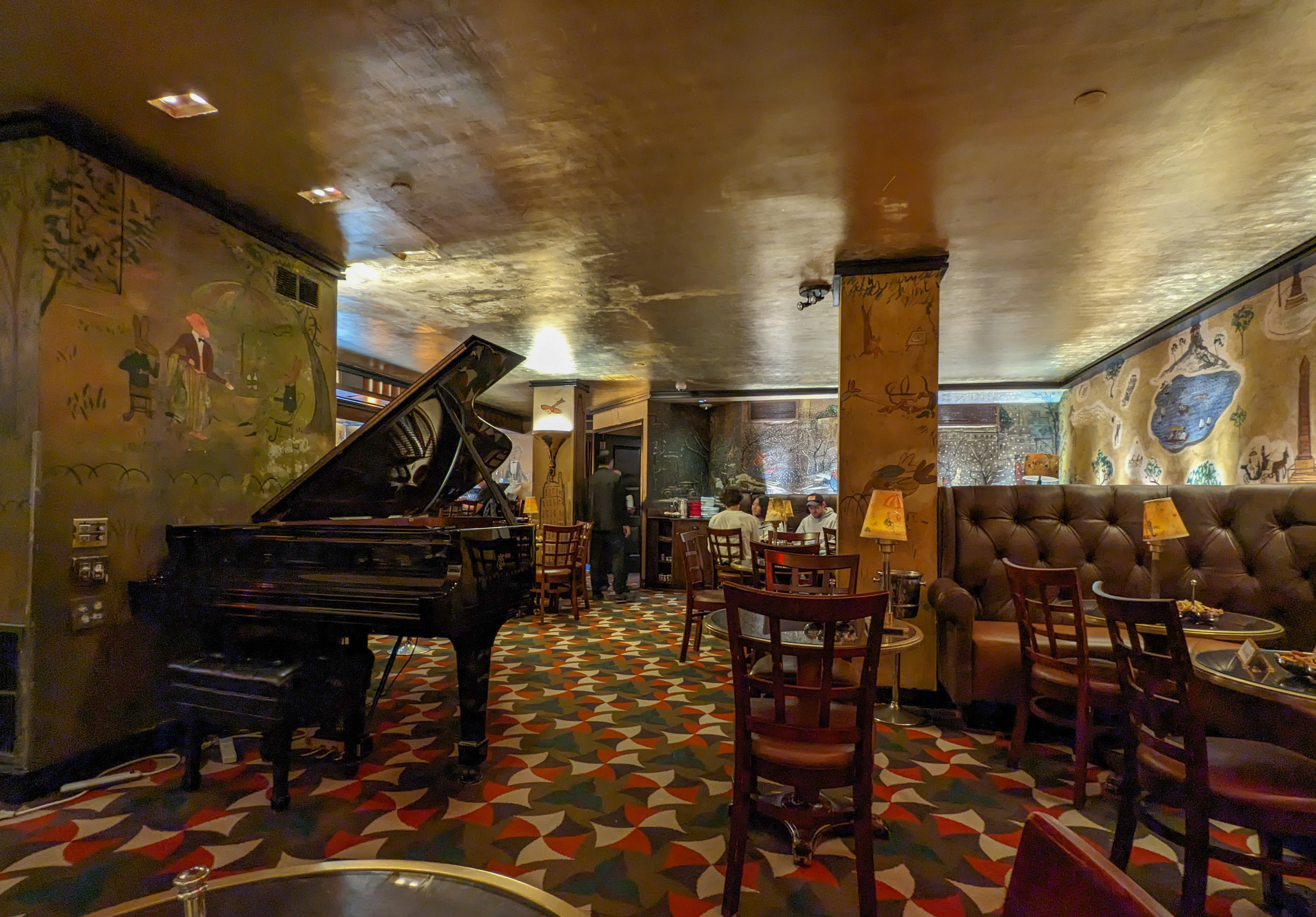
- Interactive map of Bemelmans Bar

Restaurant information
- Established: 1947
- Manager: Dimitrios Michalopoulos
- Location: 35 East 76th St., Manhattan, New York City
- Coordinates: 40.774448°N 73.963072°W
- Website: Official website

Bemelmans Bar is a cocktail lounge and piano bar in the Carlyle Hotel, on the Upper East Side in Manhattan, New York City. The bar opened in the 1940s, serving wealthy Upper East Siders and numerous celebrities. Bemelmans has distinctive Art Deco decor, including murals of Madeline painted by Ludwig Bemelmans, author and illustrator of Madeline. It has been known for multiple drinks, though in recent years it is best known for its martinis, often served very dirty.

The bar opened in 1947, and has been a place for celebrities and socialites to frequent since that time. In the early 2000s, the bar was renovated and its cocktail program was remade by bartender Audrey Saunders. In the 2020s, the bar temporarily closed due to the COVID-19 pandemic. Upon reopening, Bemelmans has seen a surge in popularity, especially with younger New Yorkers, eager for an authentic New York experience.

== Attributes ==
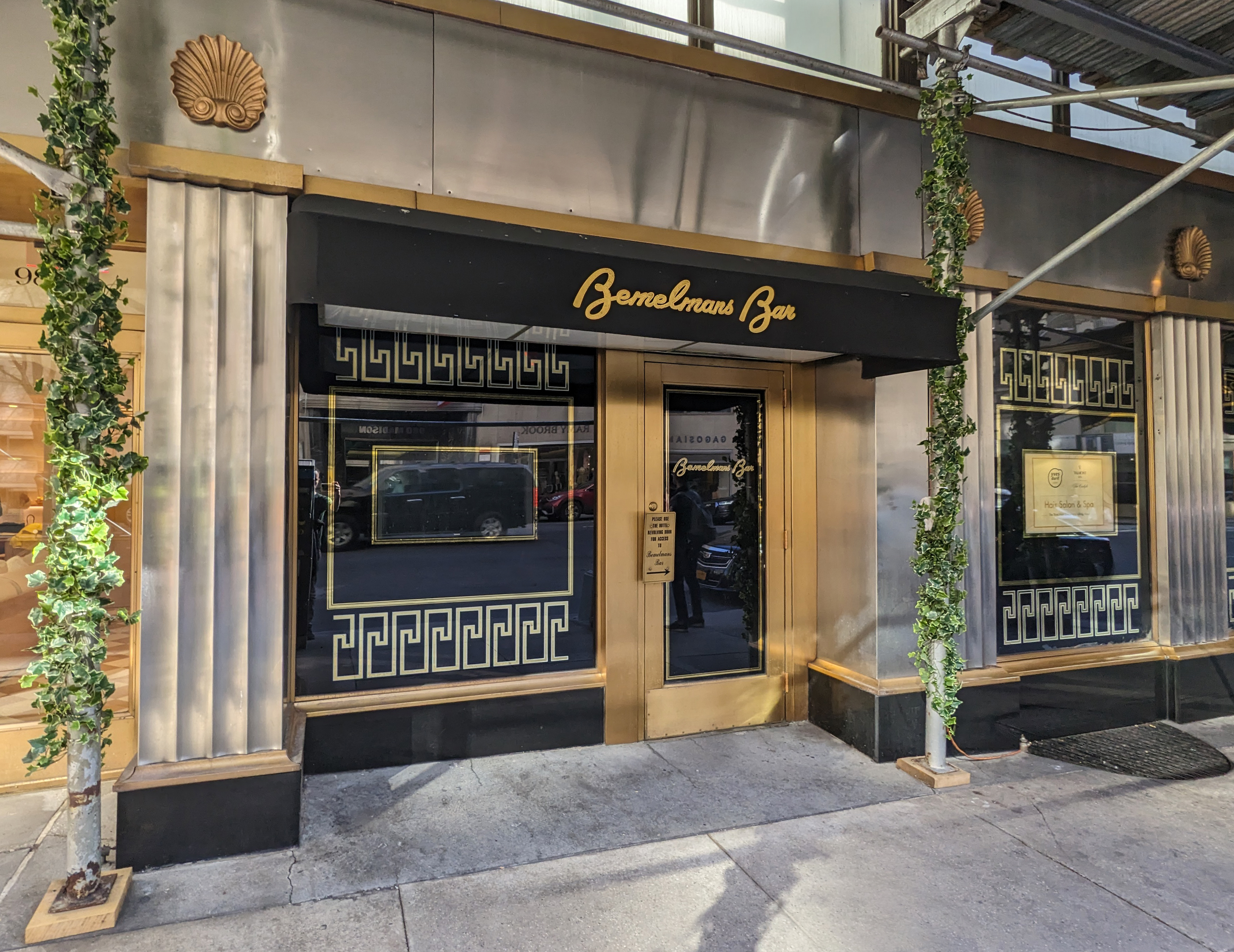
Former entrance on Madison Avenue

The bar is designed in an Art Deco style with a gold-leaf ceiling and discreet lighting, including a small shaded lamp with an amber glow on each of its 21 glass-top tables. It is cozy, and has chocolate leather banquettes lining the wall, as well as a grand piano. It is typically packed with people and noisy. Bartenders have worn bright Ferrari-red suit jackets while working since possibly around 2000.

The bar's atmosphere is often written up as a unique experience. Foster Kamer, writing for New York magazine in 2020, said "The acoustics are perfect. When it's busy, the room hums as if it's the center of the world, and when it's quiet, as a veritable oasis of serene calm, it throws into sharp relief the relative chaos of the city outside. It doesn't sparkle; it glows — in rose gold, brass, and maroon hues."

Bemelmans is managed by Dimitrios Michalopoulos, who began working at the hotel as an assistant manager around 2016. Head bartender Luis Serrano has worked at Bemelmans since 1989; 37 years ago. He is the second-longest tenured bartender there, after Tommy Rowles, who worked there for 53 years. Other bartenders involved in managing Bemelmans have included notable mixologists Dale DeGroff and Audrey Saunders. DeGroff hired Saunders as bar manager around 2001. Saunders excelled at her job there, and was later approached to be an operating partner and the creative talent for the Pegu Club bar she became known for. In 2007, noted bartender Brian Van Flandern left Per Se to rework the bar program at Bemelmans.

The bar has always been known for its music. For over 14 seasons, jazz pianist and vocalist Barbara Carroll performed at Bemelmans. For about 25 years, composer and pianist Earl Rose has played at the bar. The bar was reviewed and listed first among the best piano bars in New York City by Town and Country magazine, which stated that "no list of notable piano bars in New York would be complete without Bemelmans".

=== Central Park mural ===
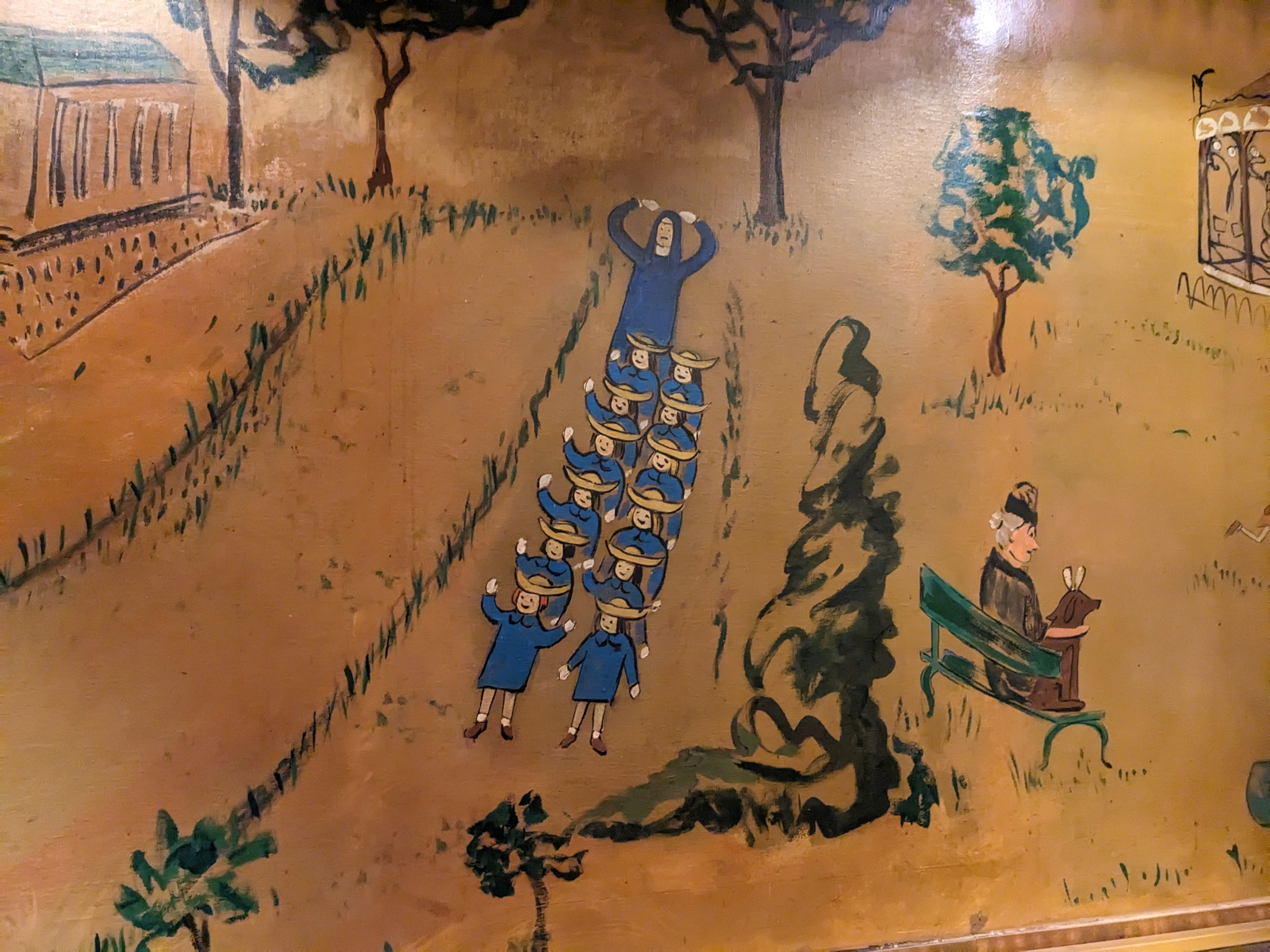
A portion of the mural featuring Madeline and other characters from the Madeline books

Bemelmans Bar is known for its walls, decorated with a work titled Central Park: a pale yellow mural depicting Madeline, her eleven classmates, and their guardian in Central Park across four seasons. The painting has many vignettes with no central narrative; the vignettes are scattered throughout the room divided by painted trees and grass. The mural includes typical park scenes along with whimsical animals like a monkey-waiter serving two rabbit gentlemen, an ice-skating elephant, cigar-smoking bunnies, and rabbits building a snow bunny. The work was painted by Ludwig Bemelmans, author of Madeline, in 1947. Bemelmans is the namesake of the bar, and his mural there is his only artwork remaining on display to the public. Other murals were in the Hapsburg House restaurant in the city, a nightclub on the Île Saint-Louis in Paris, and the playroom on Aristotle Onassis's yacht. Instead of accepting payment for his work, Bemelmans received a year and a half of accommodations at the Carlyle for himself and his family. Bemelmans painted himself into one of the scenes, depicted as a waiter or bartender holding a bill. As of 2000, this portion of the mural is a few feet to the right of guests facing the bar's cash register. The entire artwork gives a playful feel to the otherwise sophisticated bar, adorned with dark leather and wood.

=== Drinks ===
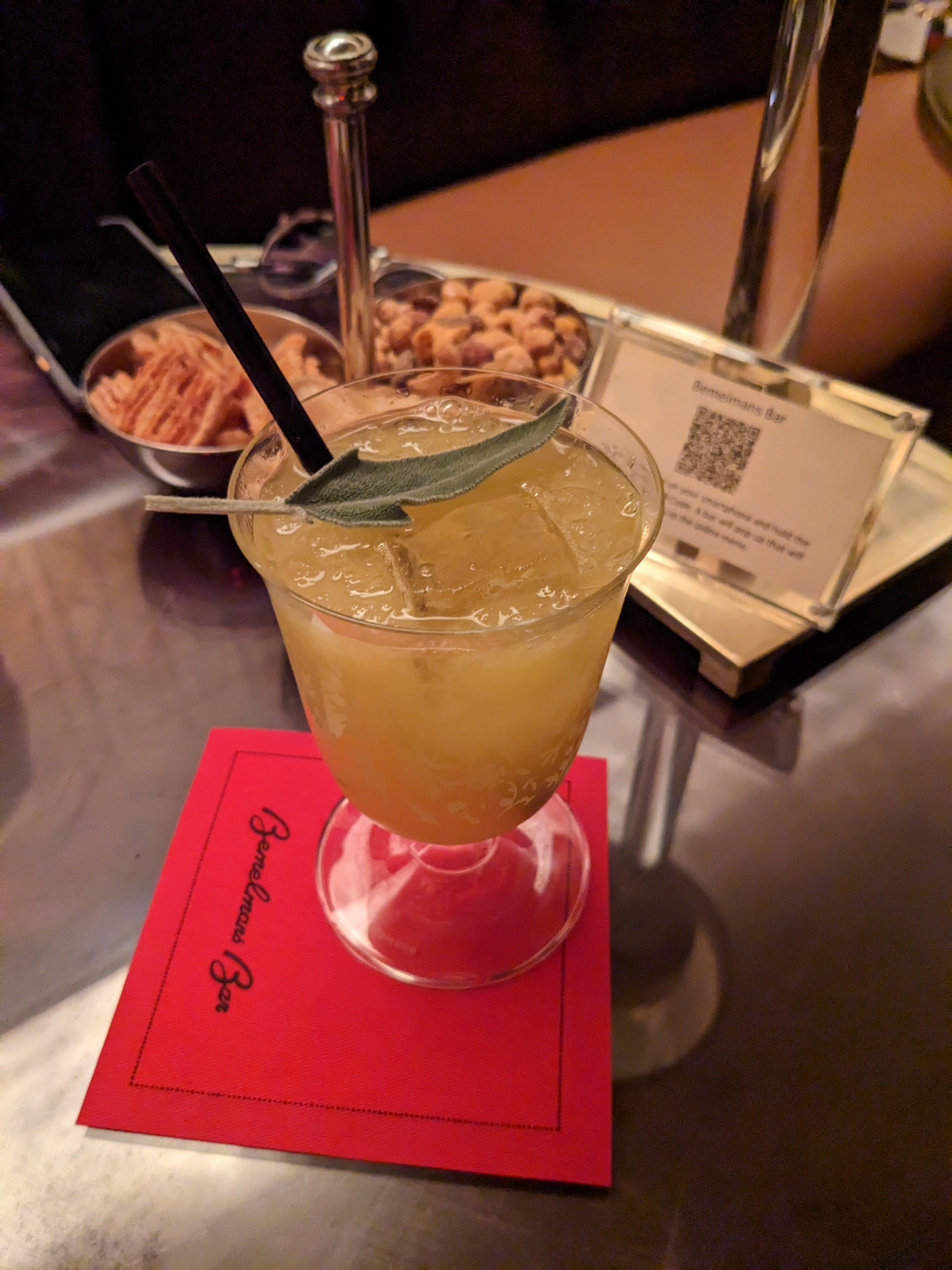
A non-alcoholic drink at Bemelmans

As of 2021, the most-requested drink at Bemelmans is a martini, almost always dirty, and often very dirty. The bartenders make an estimated 1,000 martinis per night there; the head bartender Luis Serrano estimated about 80 percent of customers order one on a weekend. The bar also became known for The Carlyle Punch, once its signature cocktail, though no longer on the menu. Martinis were not always the most popular drink; in prior decades it was Black Russians, scotch on the rocks, gin & tonics, and vodka-tonics; Manhattans also came close to the popularity of martinis there at one time.

Recent drinks have included The Gillespie, named for Chris Gillespie (a long-time entertainer at the bar) and made with Hudson Manhattan Rye, lime juice, rosemary ginger syrup, ginger beer, and egg white. The JFK Daiquiri, another served at Bemelmans, was inspired by the daiquiri, one of John F. Kennedy's favorite drinks. Drinks and food are expensive: cocktails averaged $23–25 in 2016.

In 2013, Saunders-created drinks including the Gin-Gin Mule and Old Cuban remained as specialty features at Bemelmans.

== History ==
=== 20th century ===
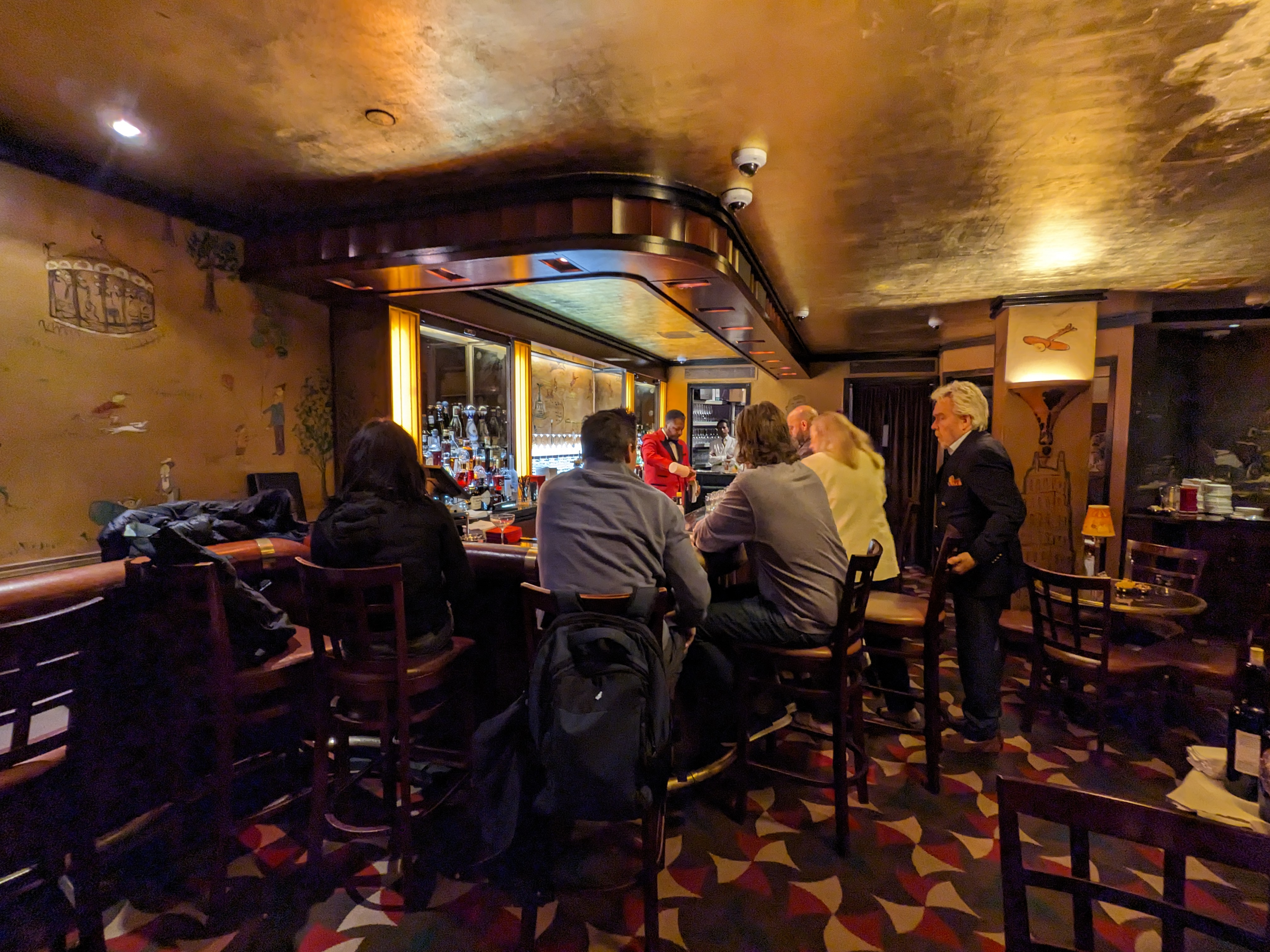
The bar

The bar was created and named for Ludwig Bemelmans in the 1940s, and opened in 1947. Bemelmans was the author and illustrator of Madeline, and was formerly a restaurateur and hotel employee. Robert Huyot, the hotel's general manager, was a friend of Bemelmans, and asked him to paint the bar's murals in exchange for 18 months' stay at the hotel for him and his family (the duration required to complete the murals).

In 1989, the hotel celebrated the 50th anniversary of the first Madeline book with a party at the bar.

=== Early 21st century ===
In 2001, the hotel changed ownership and the bar closed for renovations. Woodwork and leather were restored, nicotine was scraped from the walls, and a layer of 24-karat gold leaf was applied to the bar's ceilings. Amid the renovations, the hotel hired star bartender Dale DeGroff to reinvigorate the cocktail program, and he had Audrey Saunders, his protégé, oversee a new drink menu with new flavors and homemade ginger beer.

Around 2005, the bar dedicated several afternoons per week for children and their adult guests. The events, called The Madeline Experience, involved lunch, afternoon tea, shrimp arranged in two straight lines (like the schoolgirls in Madeline) an Eiffel Tower sundae, piano music, and storytelling. In 2007, the event was revived as the Madeline Tea Party at Bemelmans Bar, taking place on Saturdays and Sundays. The event was again held in 2019, on the 80th anniversary of Madeline's publication.

=== COVID-19 pandemic and subsequent use ===
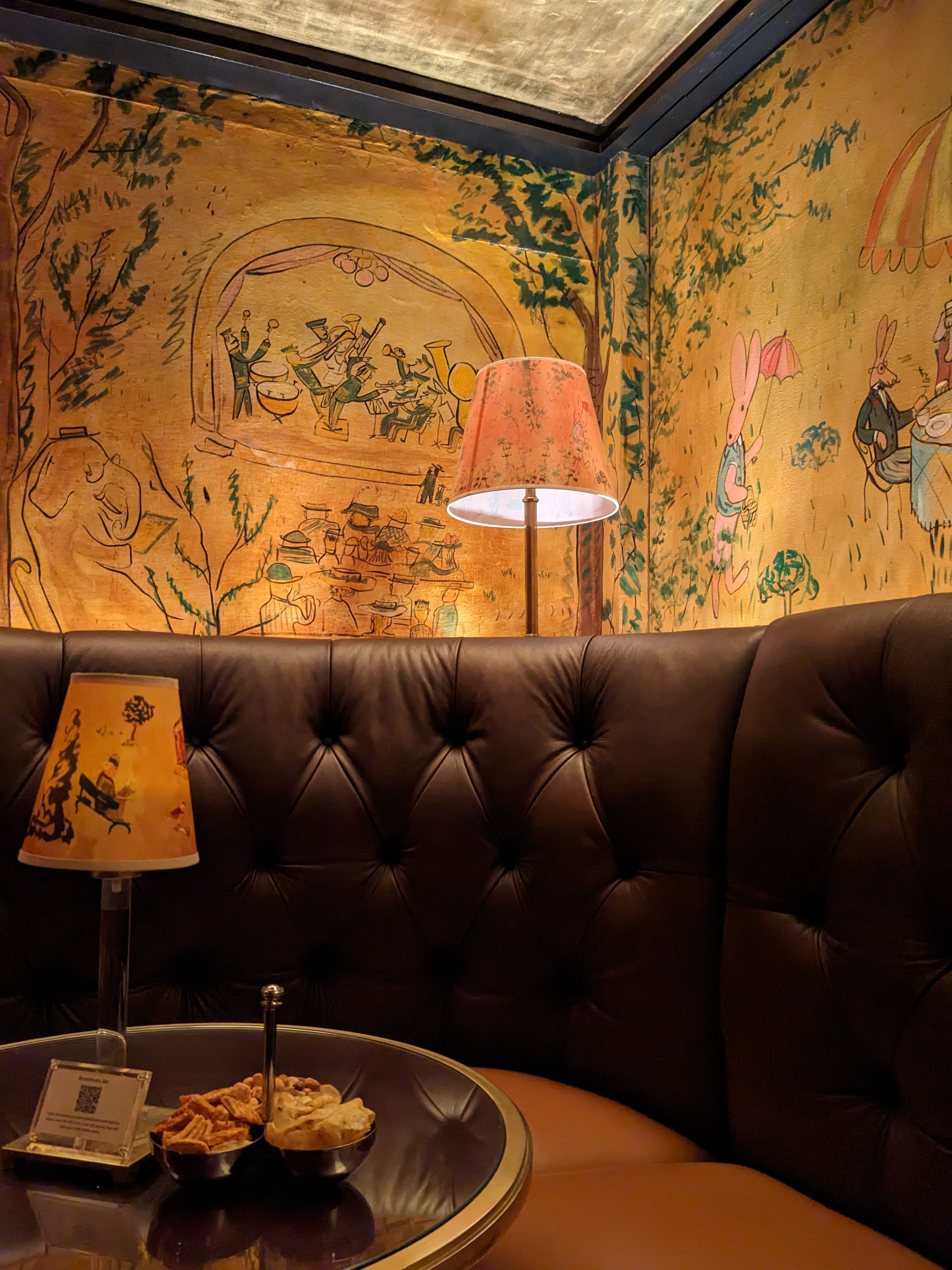
A corner table in the bar

On March 16, 2020, amid the COVID-19 pandemic, indoor dining was completely restricted in New York state, forcing the bar's indefinite closure. During its time closed, the bar created a new cocktail menu with new drinks, began accepting reservations on Tock, and accepted modern social media by creating an Instagram account.

In May 2021, the bar reopened at 50 percent capacity, though it became bustling with music and with a new drink menu (using a QR code) featuring guests, artists, and musicians who helped make the bar famous. It was the first time Bemelmans began a reservation-only policy, necessary to control demand for dining in the space. Contact tracers checked in guests, and each reservation had a 90-minute time limit. Bar seats were restricted from use. Masks were mandated when not at tables, though it was loosely enforced. Staff were required to wear masks.

By late 2021, as the COVID-19 pandemic began to wane, the bar became immensely popular, enough to require a security team. The bar's manager would previously tell guests to come back later if the venue was too busy, though lately these patrons would rather wait. While Bemelmans has typically been an "old-school" bar inviting in regulars, Upper East Siders with tailored clothes, young people (part of Gen Z) began to visit the bar more, dressed casually, taking selfies of themselves in the space, and ordering a large volume of espresso martinis. The New York Times saw it as part of a trend that youth have for midcentury Manhattan, and their efforts to find and enjoy the "New York-iest New York experiences". While the management take care to enforce their dress code and limit of the size of a party, they welcome younger visitors as part of appealing to successive generations, keeping in business.

== Notable people ==
The bar is a regular attractor of people of fame, including socialites, film stars, politicians, and businessmen. Notable visitors to the bar have included John F. Kennedy, Judy Collins, Frank Sinatra, Britney Spears, Paul McCartney, Elizabeth Taylor, Harry Truman, Prince Harry and Meghan, Steve Martin, Matt Dillon, Tom Cruise, Robert De Niro, Heather Graham, and Kim Basinger.

In 2022, celebrity Kylie Minogue visited the bar to promote her wine collection, and sang several of her popular songs at the grand piano. She returned a few days later to demonstrate a new cocktail, the Pink Pearl, created by one of Bemelmans' bartenders, with occasional assistance from the bartender.

== Reception ==
The bar is considered an "icon" and "cultural touchstone" by Business Insider. In 2022, the Australian Gourmet Traveller magazine listed it among four other classic cocktail bars to visit in the city. It referred to it as a "quintessential supper club", "just about everyone's favourite sophisticated uptown joint". According to Bon Appetit, the bar is so perfect that every guidebook directs visitors to Bemelmans. Regan Hofmann, writing for Punch in 2015, considered Bemelmans the city's "most iconic hotel bar", and one of New York's "most well-known hidden treasures".

In 2022, Architectural Digest identified a trend, what they dubbed "the Bemelmans effect", where bars are copying elements from Bemelmans, like its upscale, elegant, romantic, and transportive decor and atmosphere. Nines, a piano bar in Manhattan, surveyed popular, long-lasting gathering places, especially that increased in popularity in the "age of Instagram"; Bemelmans kept appearing, and thus the bar used elements from Bemelmans.

== In popular culture ==
The 2015 film A Very Murray Christmas by director Sofia Coppola was set in the Carlyle and in Bemelmans Bar. In 2020, the television show High Fidelity featured Bemelmans as a significant plot point. Later in the year, the bar appeared in an episode of Love Life. The bar also appears in the 2020 film On the Rocks, also directed by Coppola, where it also is used for the official movie poster. Beside drawings of Madeline, New York magazine interprets the choice of setting as "nothing if not a great Freudian cocktail".
