= Last Word (cocktail) =

Gin based prohibition-era cocktail

The Last Word
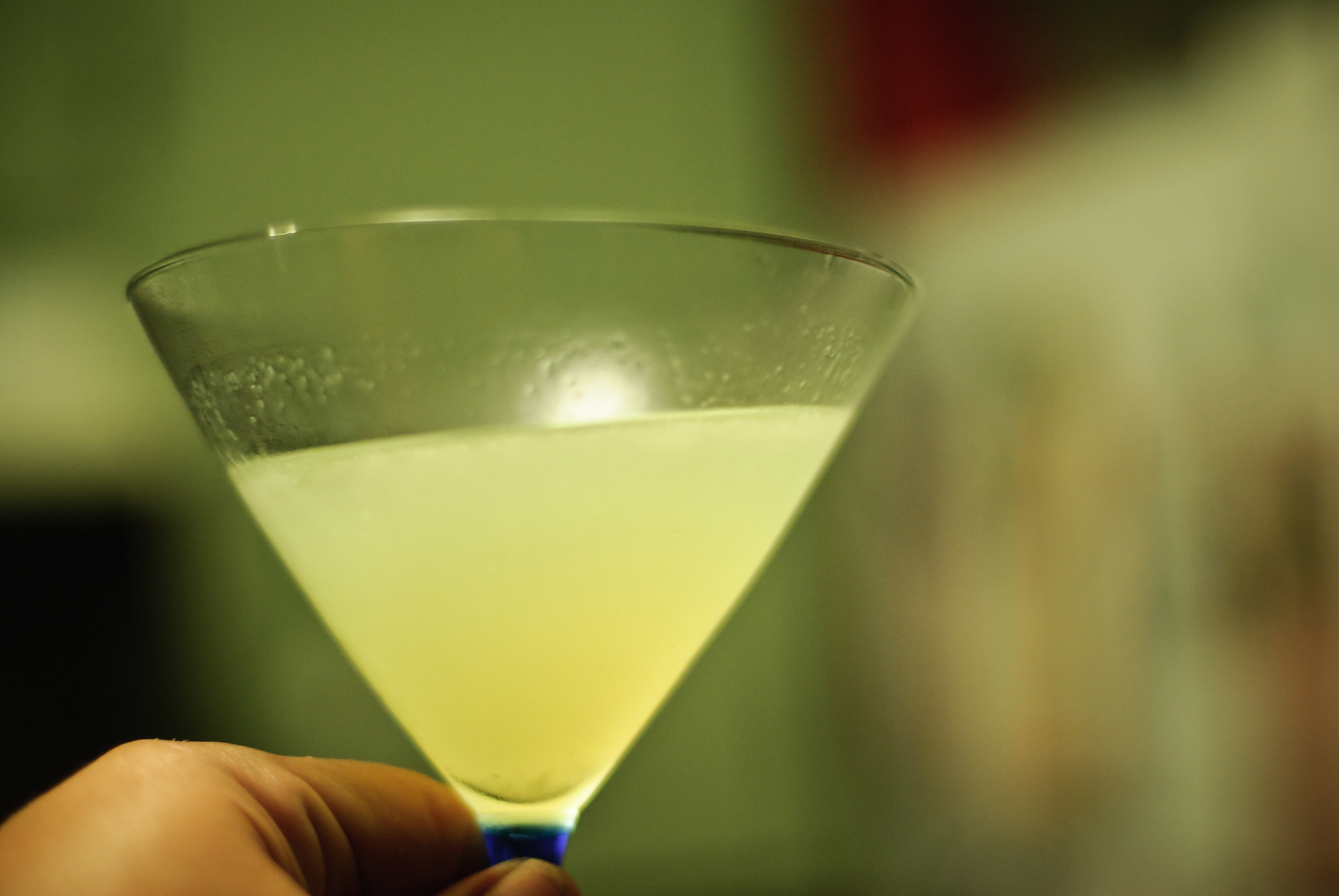
- Type: Cocktail
- Ingredients: 22.5 ml gin; 22.5 ml green Chartreuse; 22.5 ml maraschino Luxardo; 22.5 ml fresh lime juice
- Base spirit: Gin, green Chartreuse
- Standard drinkware: Cocktail glass
- Served: Straight up: chilled, without ice
- Preparation: Add all ingredients into a cocktail shaker. Shake with ice and strain into a chilled cocktail glass.

The Last Word is a gin-based cocktail originating at the Detroit Athletic Club in the 1910s, shortly before the start of Prohibition. After a long period of obscurity, it enjoyed a renewed popularity in the cocktail renaissance of the 2000s after being discovered by bartender Murray Stenson of the Zig Zag Café in Seattle.

== Recipe and variations ==
The Last Word consists of equal amounts of gin, green Chartreuse, maraschino liqueur, and freshly pressed lime juice, which are combined in a shaker with ice. After shaking, the mix is poured through a cocktail strainer and served straight up without ice.

The Prohibition-era cocktail at the Detroit Athletic Club used bathtub gin, and today the club serves a recreation of that spirit (vodka, spices, herbs, citrus) in their Last Word. Other variants include the "Final Ward," created by the New York bartender Phil Ward, which substitutes rye whiskey and lemon juice for gin and lime; and the "Last of the Oaxacans," which uses mezcal instead of gin.

== History ==
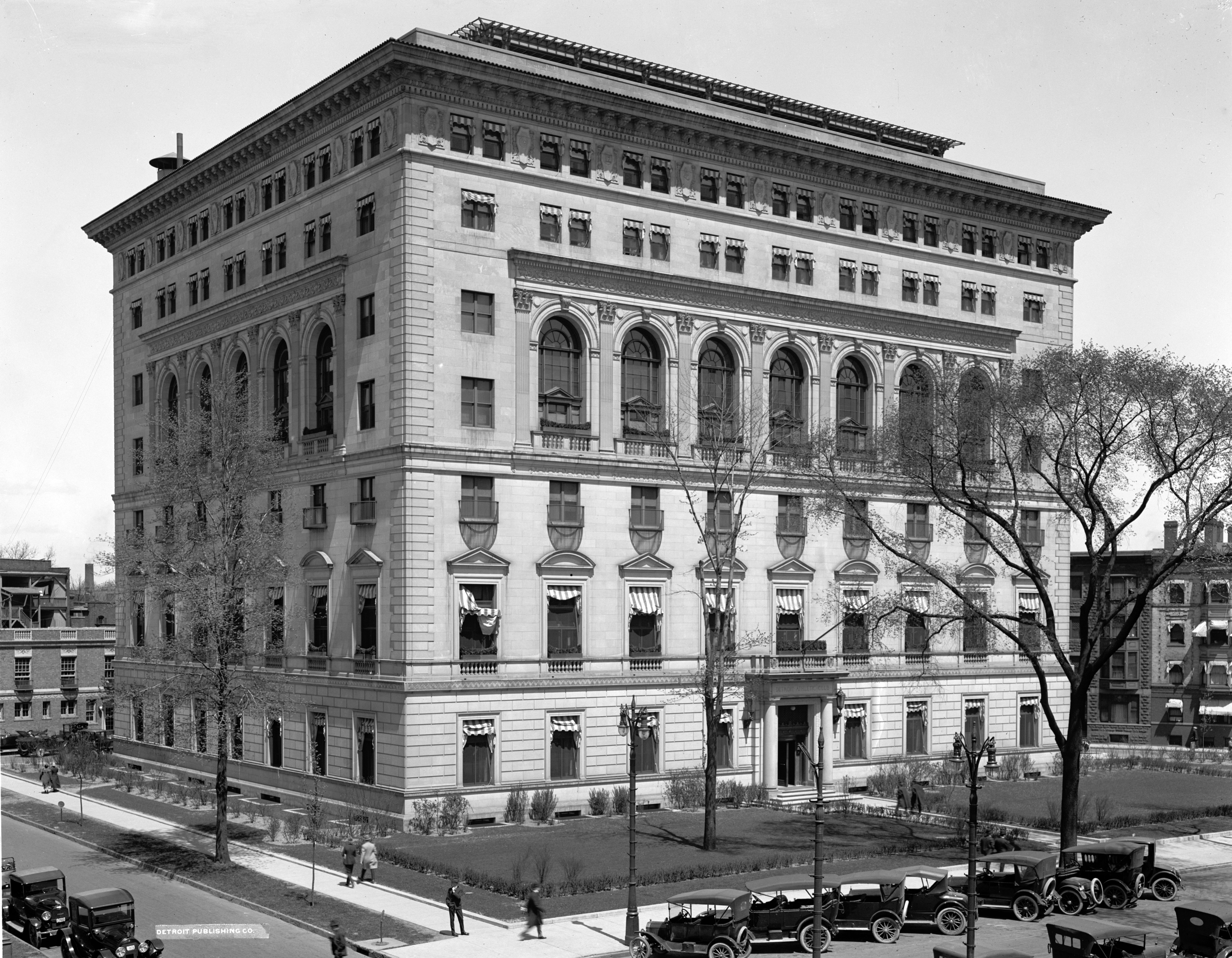
The Detroit Athletic Club in 1915

Ted Saucier's 1951 cocktail book Bottoms Up! states that the Last Word originated at the Detroit Athletic Club and had been brought to New York in the late 1910s by the acclaimed vaudeville monologist Frank Fogarty, who had been working in Detroit. This had led some authors to assume that Fogarty had invented the drink. While its inventor is unknown, Detroit Athletic Club archives revealed the Last Word to be on the menu as early as 1916, when it was the club's most expensive cocktail at a price of 35 cents (equivalent to $10.36 in 2025).

The Last Word fell into obscurity after World War II. In 2003, Seattle bartender Murray Stenson saw the recipe in a copy of Bottoms Up! and added it to the menu of the Zig Zag Café, where it became a regional cult hit before spreading in popularity across the country. Bartender Audrey Saunders of New York's Pegu Club called the drink a "perfectly balanced" palate cleanser with a "good bite." The renewed interest in the drink then inspired the creation of other cocktails like the paper plane and the gin blossom.

The recipe subsequently reappeared in cocktail guides, including the Mr. Boston Official Bartender's Guide.

== In popular culture ==
On May 20, 2011 Rachel Maddow demonstrated the preparation of the cocktail in her show on MSNBC, calling the drink the "last word for the end of the world." This was in reference to the rapture and end of world prediction of the Christian radio host Harold Camping and the MSNBC news program The Last Word with Lawrence O'Donnell, which covered Camping's predictions extensively.

== See also ==
- List of cocktails
- Naked and famous (cocktail)
- Paper plane (cocktail)
