= Nick & Nora (glass) =

Stemmed glass used to serve mixed drinks

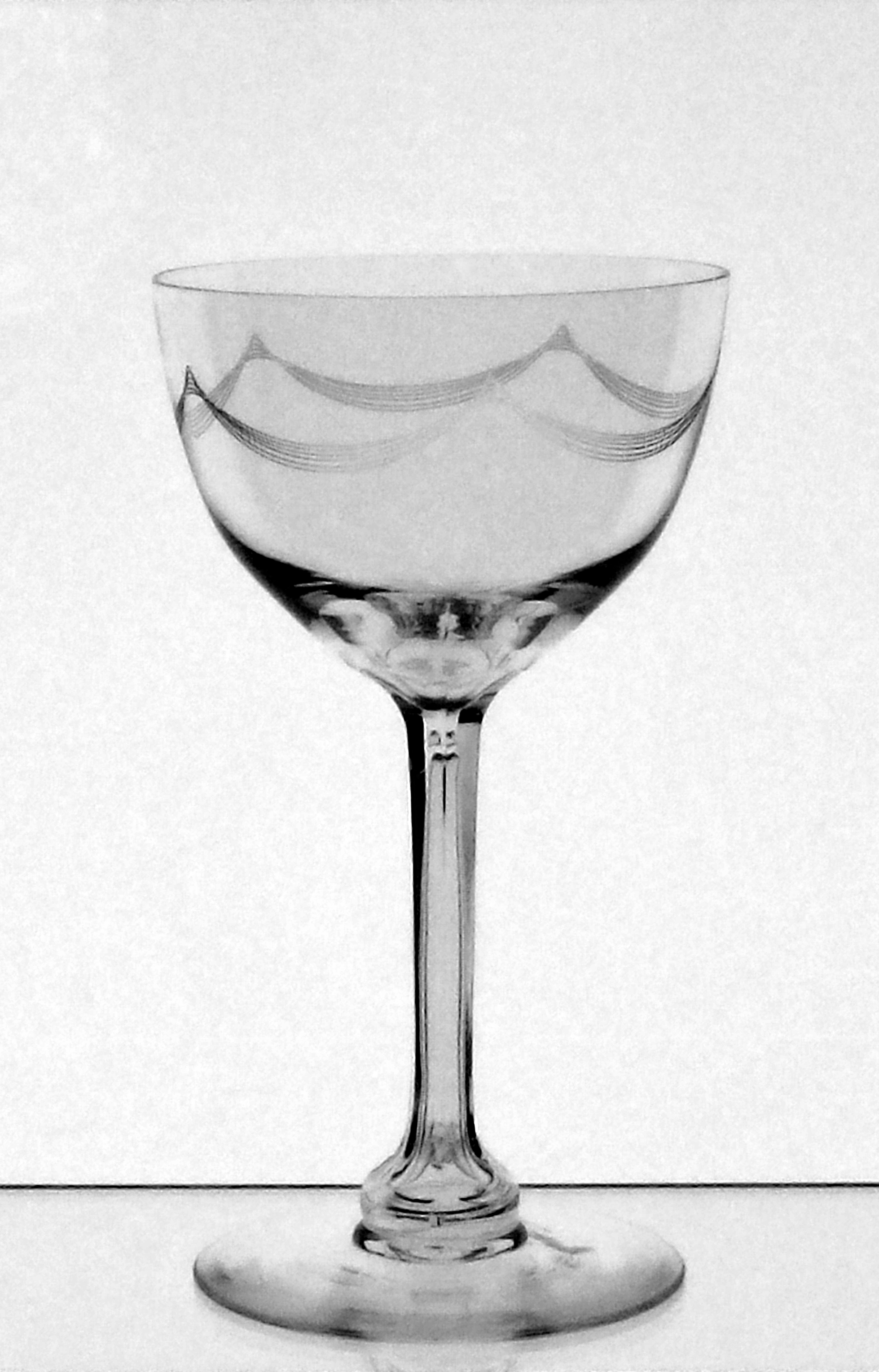
An etched Nick & Nora cocktail glass

A Nick & Nora glass is a stemmed glass with an inverted bowl, mainly used to serve straight-up cocktails. The glass is similar to a cocktail glass or martini glass.

Use of the glass became widespread beginning in the late 1980s, when bartender Dale DeGroff had several made for the Rainbow Room restaurant in New York City. The design was found in a 1930s catalog under the name "Little Martini"; DeGroff was looking for a small, delicate glass to counter the large conical martini glasses popular at the time. DeGroff's protégée Audrey Saunders spread the use of the glass to other bars in subsequent years. In the present day, the glass is found in numerous manufacturer catalogs and in upscale bars across the United States, Canada, and the United Kingdom.

== Design ==
The glass has a long stem, a high-sided bowl, a narrow mouth, and a moderate capacity (of about 5 US fluid ounces (150 ml)). It is considered a more elegant alternative to the large wide-mouthed martini glasses that were popular in bars in the 1980s. The glass's tighter bowl and straighter sides hold in aromas better than the wider martini glasses, are more spill-resistant, and keep cocktails colder longer. The glass also resembles a coupe, though with a smaller diameter and higher sides.

== History ==
The glass was named by bartender Dale DeGroff for Nick and Nora Charles, a pair of fictional detectives. DeGroff was hired to lead the bar program at the Rainbow Room restaurant in New York City in 1987. There he made a list of classic and forgotten pre-Prohibition cocktails. These would have been served in small, delicate glasses, unlike the large conical glasses popular in the 1980s. He asked the Manhattan-based Minners Designs for a cocktail glass, like the one seen in the Thin Man films, glasses in which the characters Nick and Nora served martinis. The firm sent over their 1930s catalog, where DeGroff found a glass called the "Little Martini", and had new molds created in order to reintroduce production of the glass.

The glass was first used in the Rainbow Room in 1987. DeGroff would order new glasses using the "Nick & Nora" name, though Minners Designs kept the "Little Martini" name. After several years, Minners sold many of its catalog items, including the glass, to Steelite International. This company renamed the glass to formally become the "Nick & Nora".

Audrey Saunders, a protégé of DeGroff, spread the glass to other bars, and it became a key part of the glassware at her own bar, Pegu Club in New York City. Saunders served classic martinis in the glass, attempting to break preconceptions that larger drinks are better. Other bars followed her lead, including Please Don't Tell and Death & Co., both in the East Village in Manhattan.

The glass is now produced by numerous manufacturers, and sold by notable companies including Riedel and Crate & Barrel. Variations have emerged, including etchings, silver or gold lined rims, and acrylic versions of the glass.

== Use ==
Wine Enthusiast recommends the glass for serving the Old Pal and Bijou cocktails. Tasting Table indicates that the glass is ideal for any drink served without ice, and can be used for aperitifs, liqueurs, vermouths, wine, and other beverages.

== See also ==
- Bartending terminology
