= Pegu Club (New York City) =

Defunct cocktail bar in New York City

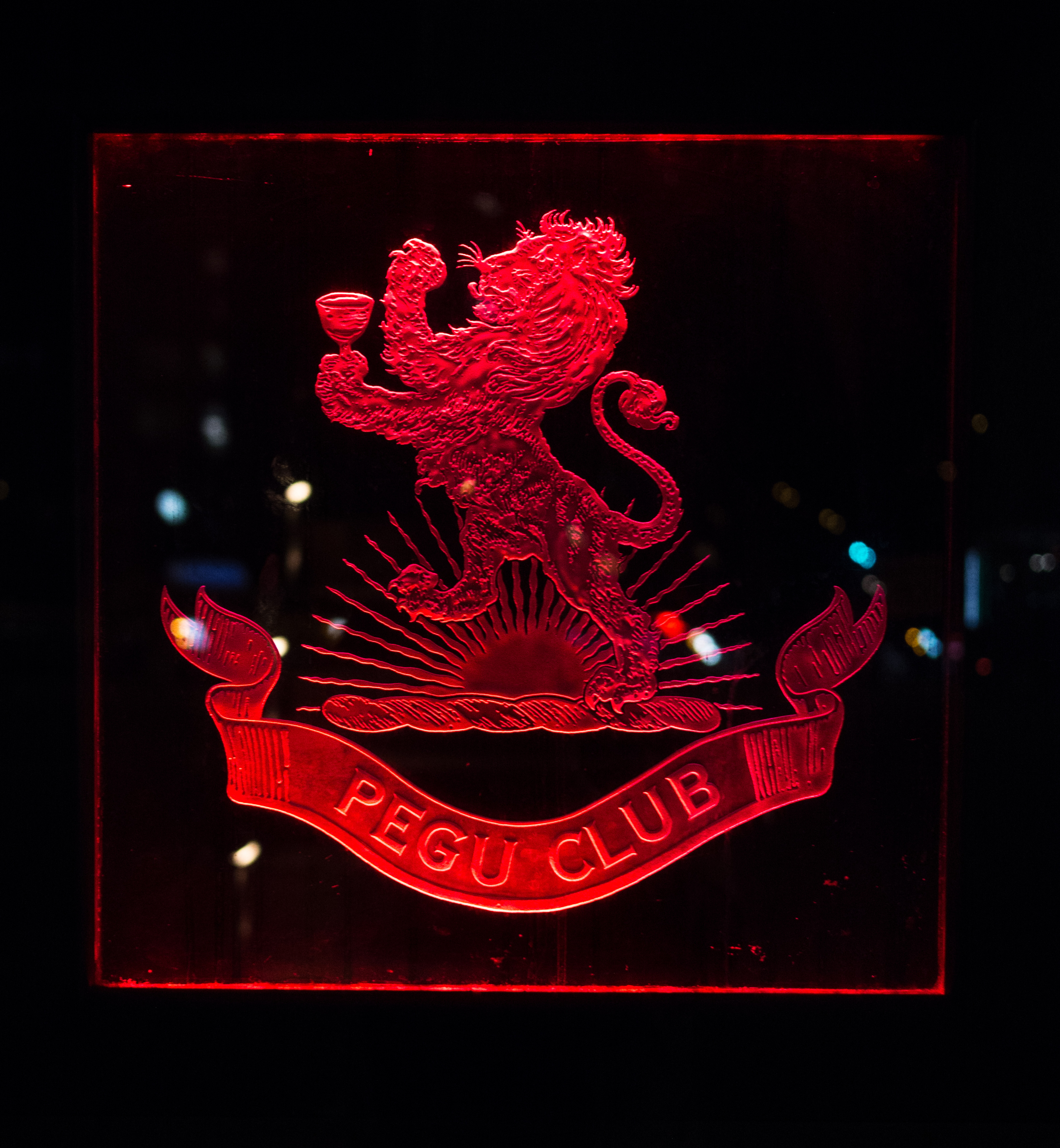
- Logo at the main entrance
- Interactive map of Pegu Club

Restaurant information
- Established: 2005
- Closed: 2020
- Location: 77 W. Houston St, Manhattan, New York City
- Coordinates: 40.726536°N 73.999554°W

Pegu Club was a craft cocktail bar in New York City, operating from 2005 to 2020. It was located on the border of SoHo and Greenwich Village in Manhattan. The bar was named after and loosely inspired by the Pegu Club, a club in a British colonial outpost in Myanmar, as well as its signature cocktail with the same name.

The bar was one of the most influential in the world, and a pioneer of the craft cocktail movement.

== Attributes ==
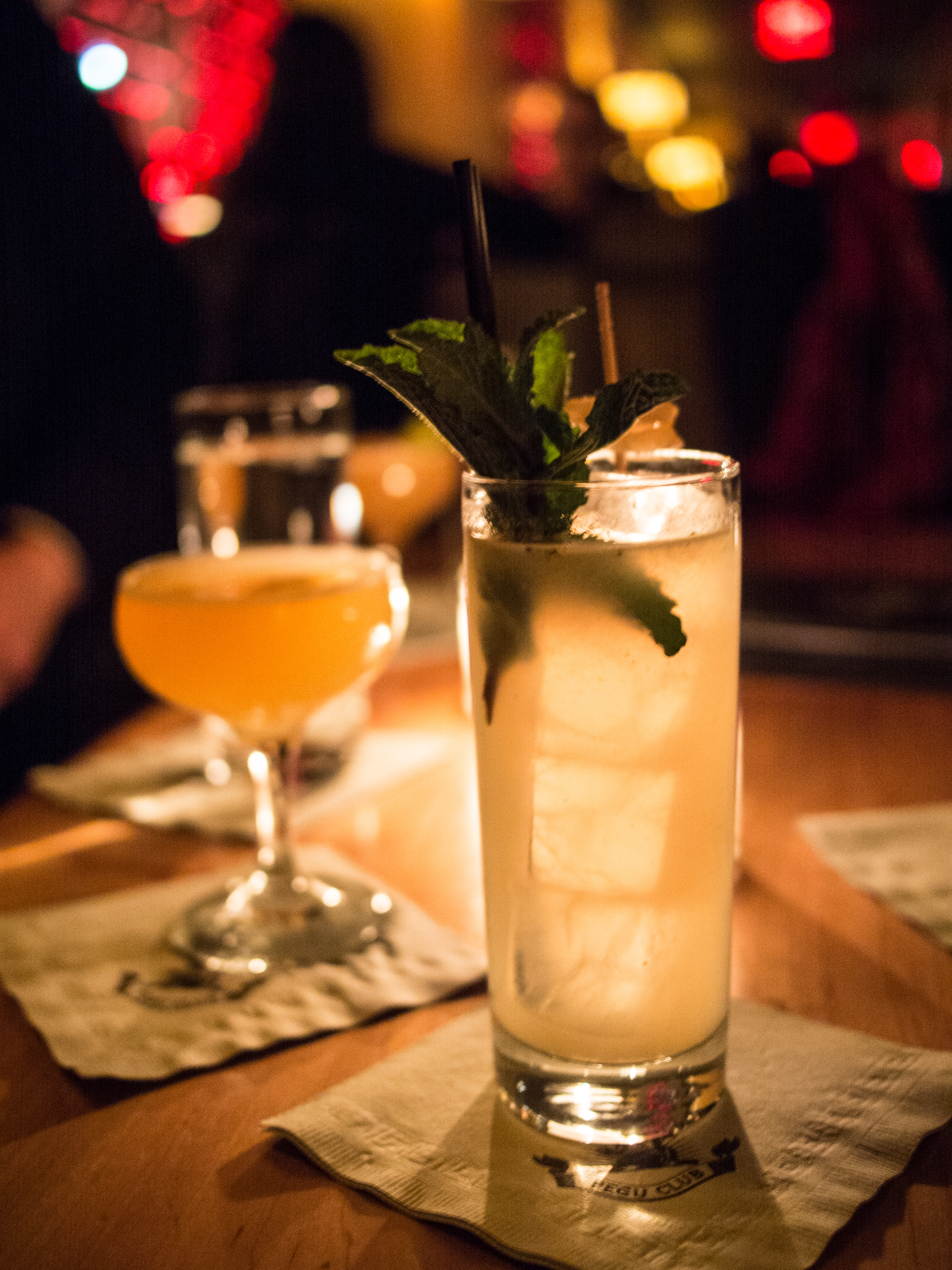
A Gin-Gin Mule at Pegu Club

The bar occupied a large space on the second floor of a green building on Houston Street. The decor had a subtle Asian theme including bamboo floors and gilded lighting, kept dimly lit. Its entrance was subtly marked, only with a small brass dragon business card holder, affixed to the front door at street-level. Tables included condiments – eyedroppers with lemon, lime, sugar, and bitters, inviting guests to customize their drinks.

Audrey Saunders was the creative talent behind the bar and its most well-known owner, among a group of partners. Another notable co-founder was Julie Reiner. Saunders had a drive for quality, partially inspired by her work at Bemelmans Bar. In testing cocktails, she would try innumerous ingredient and spirit combinations, measure her recipes, and refrigerate vermouth. For the bar, she ordered custom barware as well as a Kold-Draft ice machine. The bartenders and servers were given tailored vests over buttoned shirts or stylish cocktail dresses. Saunders was also noted to not accept poor behavior from guests at Pegu Club: part of the cocktail revolution was a change in viewing bartenders from a "liquid butler" to a professional worthy of respect.

The bar's menu had a mixture of forgotten classics, including the Pegu Club cocktail, and Saunders' own creations, including the Gin-Gin Mule, Old Cuban, and Little Italy. The bar was also known for its Fitty Fitty martini (half gin, half vermouth, with a dash of orange bitters to cut the vermouth's effect). At its opening, cocktails were $11 to $16. The bar highlighted rye and gin, and was famed for not serving any vodka, allowing its guests to discover spirits they thought they might not enjoy.

The food menu, put together with input from their chef Gavin Citron, was short though it had unusual and intriguing combinations. These included smoked trout deviled eggs, scallop mini burgers, and a slider with pulled duck and barbecue sauce. In 2005, the small plates ranged from $6 to $16.

== History ==
The space was formerly used by a "scrappy" music club before the bar opened. Pegu Club opened in 2005, owned by Audrey Saunders, who was already well-known as a bartender and protégé of Dale DeGroff. At the time of its opening, the cocktail renaissance was in its infancy, and Pegu Club was one of few places in the city to find a complex cocktail.

The bar announced its closure on April 30, 2020, stating that its lease is set to expire in October. Though Saunders had planned to keep the bar open, the business shutdown during the COVID-19 pandemic significantly impacted the bar. Saunders said the slower summer business would not sustain the operation, a rent hike was possible, the federal small business loan would not have allowed her to rehire all the staff, and there were plumbing issues in the building as well. Saunders stated she was unlikely to reopen Pegu Club elsewhere, as the bar had a sense of place in its location that would not be replicable elsewhere.

Pegu Club was one of the pioneering establishments in the cocktail renaissance. It was also influential in training several of the best-known bartenders; its opening staff was Toby Maloney, Phil Ward, Jim Meehan, and Chad Solomon, all of whom would eventually create their own cocktail bars. The bar also included notable bartenders St. John Frizell, Brian Miller, DEl Pedro, and Kenta Goto. The bars created by these bartenders included PDT, Death & Co., Mayahuel, Fort Defiance, Violet Hour, Bar Goto, The Polynesian, and many others.
