= Earl Rose =

Earl Rose may refer to:

- Earl Rose (composer) (born 1946), American composer
- Earl Rose (coroner) (1926–2012), Dallas County medical examiner during the assassination of John F. Kennedy
- Earl Rose (rugby union) (born 1980), South African rugby union player
