= Pegu Club (cocktail) =

Gin-based cocktail

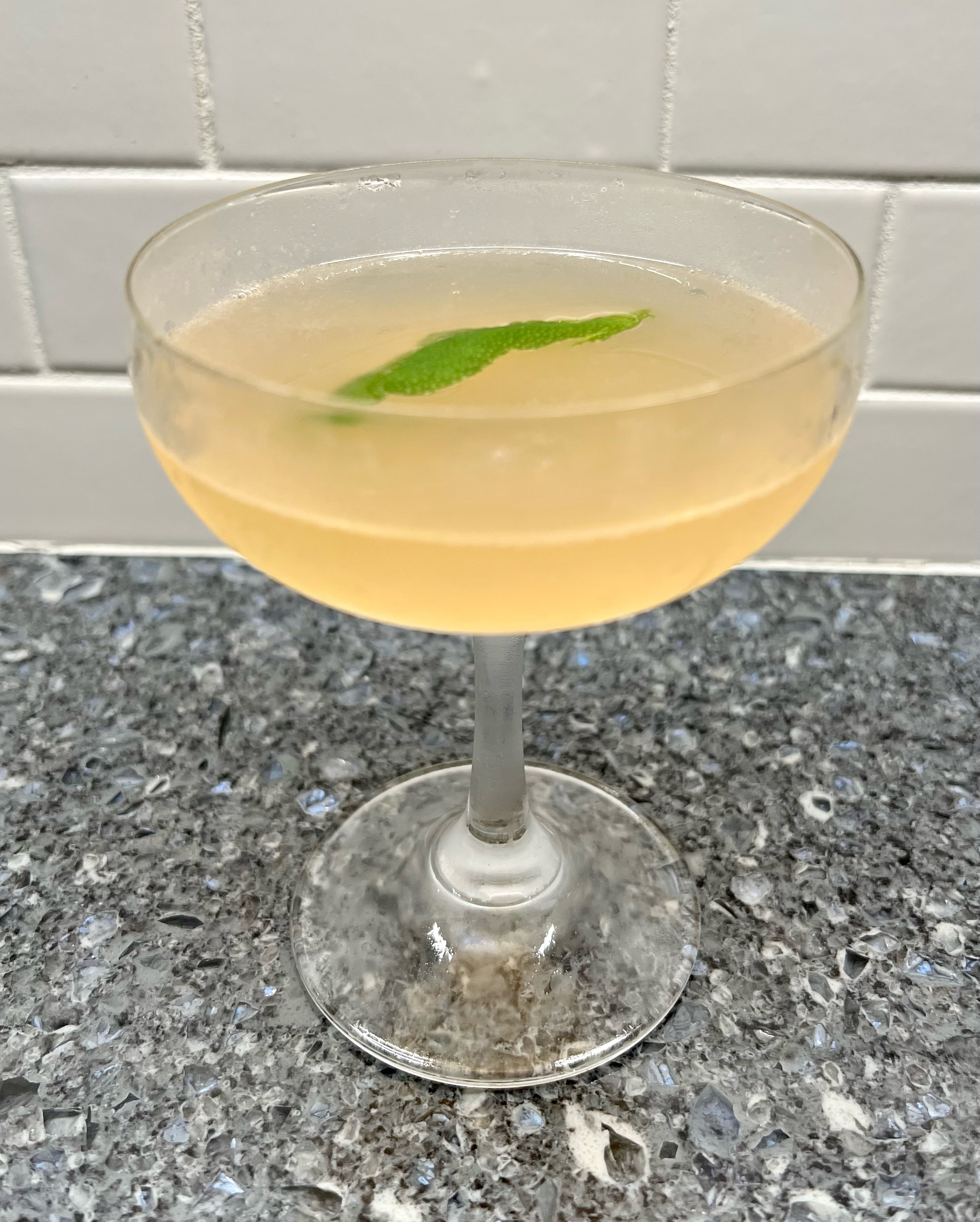
- Pegu Club Cocktail served in a coupe glass
- Type: Cocktail
- Ingredients: 1 1/2 ounces gin; 3/4 ounce orange curaçao; 1 teaspoon lime juice; Dash bitters; Dash orange bitters
- Base spirit: Gin, Curaçao
- Standard drinkware: Cocktail glass
- Standard garnish: Lime twist
- Served: Shaken
- Preparation: Shake ingredients together in a mixer with cubed ice. Strain into chilled glass, garnish and serve.

The Pegu Club or the Pegu is a gin-based cocktail that was the signature drink of Burma's Pegu Club. Located just outside Rangoon, the club was named after the Pegu, a Burmese river, and its members were those Britons who were senior government and military officials and prominent businessmen.

== History ==
=== First appearance (1923) ===
The cocktail first appeared in "Harry" of Ciro's 1923 book ABC of Mixing Cocktails. The original used preserved lime juice instead of fresh. Later cocktail books, like The Savoy Cocktail Book would begin to omit the brand name "Rose's" when specifying the lime juice. There's a lack of clarity when bartenders may have begun using fresh lime juice because of this ambiguity.

The Pegu Club is best served in a chilled glass and is considered a hot weather drink. Its taste is reminiscent of grapefruit and some bartenders will garnish it with a twist of grapefruit peel or slice of fresh grapefruit, although it is commonly served with a slice of lime to complement the lime juice in the drink.

=== Revival (2000s-present) ===
The cocktail experienced a revival in the early 2000s. Bartender Audrey Saunders founded a bar by the same name on West Houston Street in New York City. New York City's Pegu Club was credited with having "kicked the cocktail revival in New York City into high gear when it opened in 2005 and quickly became one of the most influential cocktail bars in the world." It closed in 2020, in part due to restrictions imposed in response to the COVID-19 pandemic. TimeOut, after it closed, wrote that as "one of the best bars in New York, Pegu Club was also one of the seminal bars of the craft cocktail movement. Countless bartenders worked here that went on to open their own spots that New Yorkers have come to love."

== See also ==
- List of cocktails

== Notes ==
- Ted Haigh, Vintage Spirits and Forgotten Cocktails: From the Alamagoozlum to the Zombie (Quarry Books, 2009), pp. 226ff.
