= Nick & Nora =

Nick & Nora may refer to:

- Nick & Nora (glass)
- Nick and Nora Charles
- Nick & Nora (musical)
- Nick & Norah's Infinite Playlist
- Nick and Norah's Infinite Playlist (novel)
