= Frank Joseph Fogarty =

Vaudeville comedian, actor and singer (1978–1925)

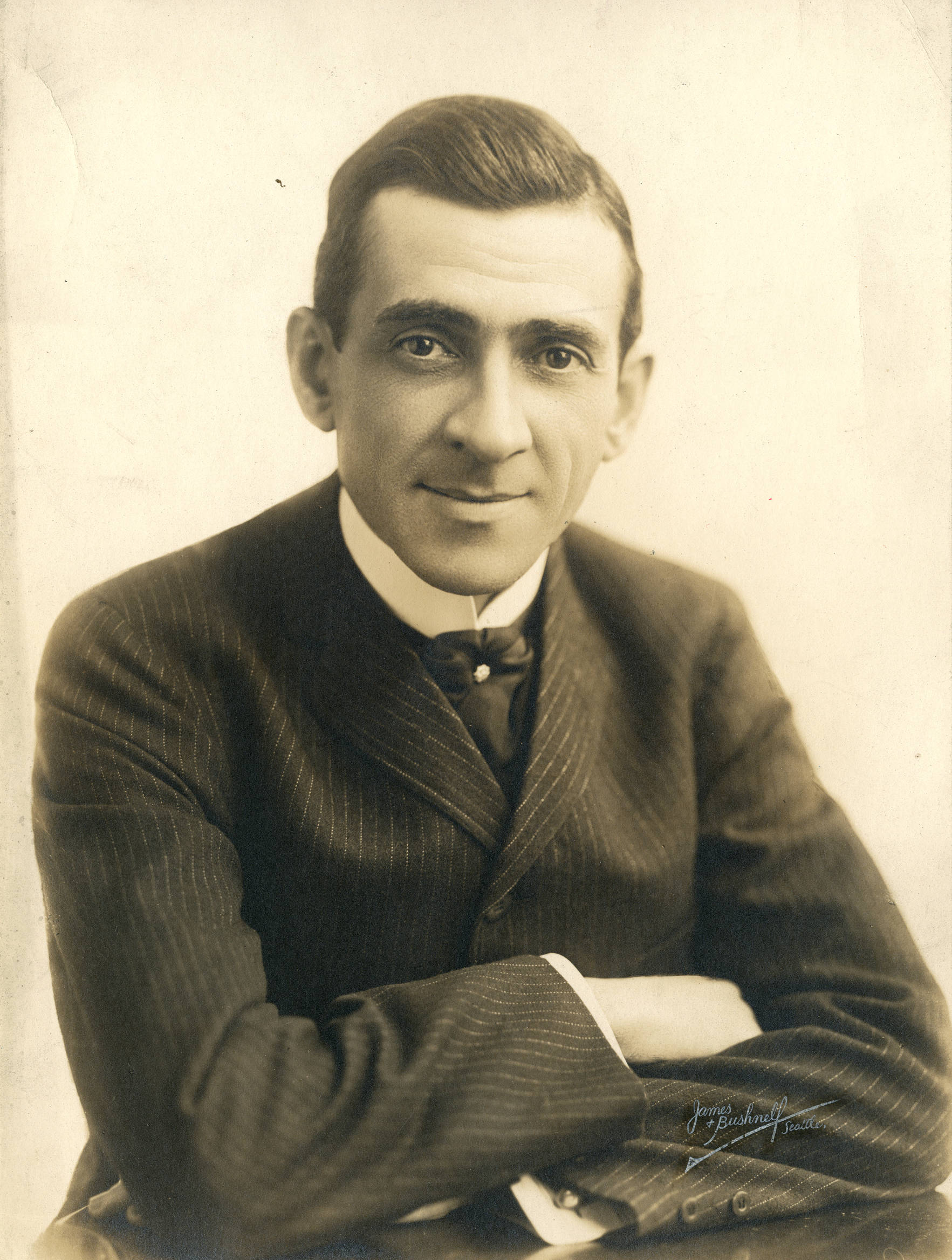
Frank Fogarty, 1916

Frank Joseph Fogarty (1878–1925) was a vaudeville comedian, actor and singer, nicknamed "the Dublin minstrel". While being among the best known vaudeville artists of his time, he is now mostly remembered for his association with the Last Word cocktail.

== Life ==
Fogarty was the son of an Irish immigrant. His father Patrick Fogarty was born 1839 in Tipperary, Ireland and moved to New York City shortly before the civil war. There he settled in Brooklyn, got married and worked for the Pinkerton detective agency. Fogarty had an older brother Frank, who became the manager of a jewelry firm and was involved in local politics for the Democratic party.

Fogarty started to perform on local stages in Brooklyn at the age of seven, where he was singing songs and doing impersonations of actors and celebrities of the day. As a young adult he shortly worked for a jewelry store before pursuing a career as a professional vaudeville monologist. Fogarty went on to become a well known vaudeville artist performing a throughout the United States and acquired the nickname "the Dublin minstrel". His performances usually started with a song and ended with a heart-throb recitation. In 1912 he won The New York Morning Telegraph's contest for best vaudeville artist and 1914 he was elected president of The White Rats (vaudeville actors union). Around 1918 he retired from professional performing and worked as the executive secretary to the borough president of Brooklyn for the last eight years of his life. He died of pneumonia on April 5, 1925.

Fogarty was married twice. First to Helen Trix and then from 1915 until his death to the actress Grace Edmonds, with whom he had one son.

== The Last Word cocktail ==
The Last Word cocktail is commonly associated with Fogarty although the exact nature of his connection to the drink remains unclear. His association with the Last Word is due to the description in Ted Saucier's 1951 cocktail book Bottoms Up!, which also yields the oldest known recipe of it. At the time of its publication Ted Saucier was working at the Waldorf Astoria in New York City.

Courtesy, Detroit Athletic Club, Detroit
"This cocktail was introduced here about thirty years ago by Frank Fogarty who was very well known in vaudeville. He was called the 'Dublin Minstrel', and was a very fine monologue artist."

— description in Ted Saucier's Bottoms Up!

Research in the archives of Detroit Athletic Club revealed that a menu from 1916 did offer a Last Word cocktail as its most expensive cocktail for a price of 35 cents (equivalent to $10.36 in 2025). It also showed that Fogarty had visited the club in December 1916, when the Last Word was already on the menu. However neither a recipe for the cocktail nor any further information on Fogarty's connection to it was discovered.

This has led to different interpretations of Fogarty's role in the cocktail's history. Some assume that he learned about the cocktail during his visit of the club in 1916 and introduced it afterwards to New York City. Others speculate that he was involved in the creation of the cocktail itself during one of his performances in Detroit in the 1910s or that his performances as monologist there simply inspired the name for cocktail.

After the cocktail's resurgence in the 2000s it inspired a lot of variations. One of them is the Dublin Minstrel, in which the gin gets replaced by an Irish whiskey.
