= Zig Zag Café =

Cocktail bar in Seattle, Washington, U.S.

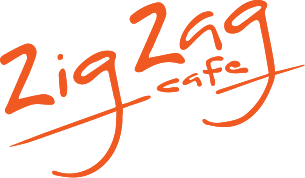

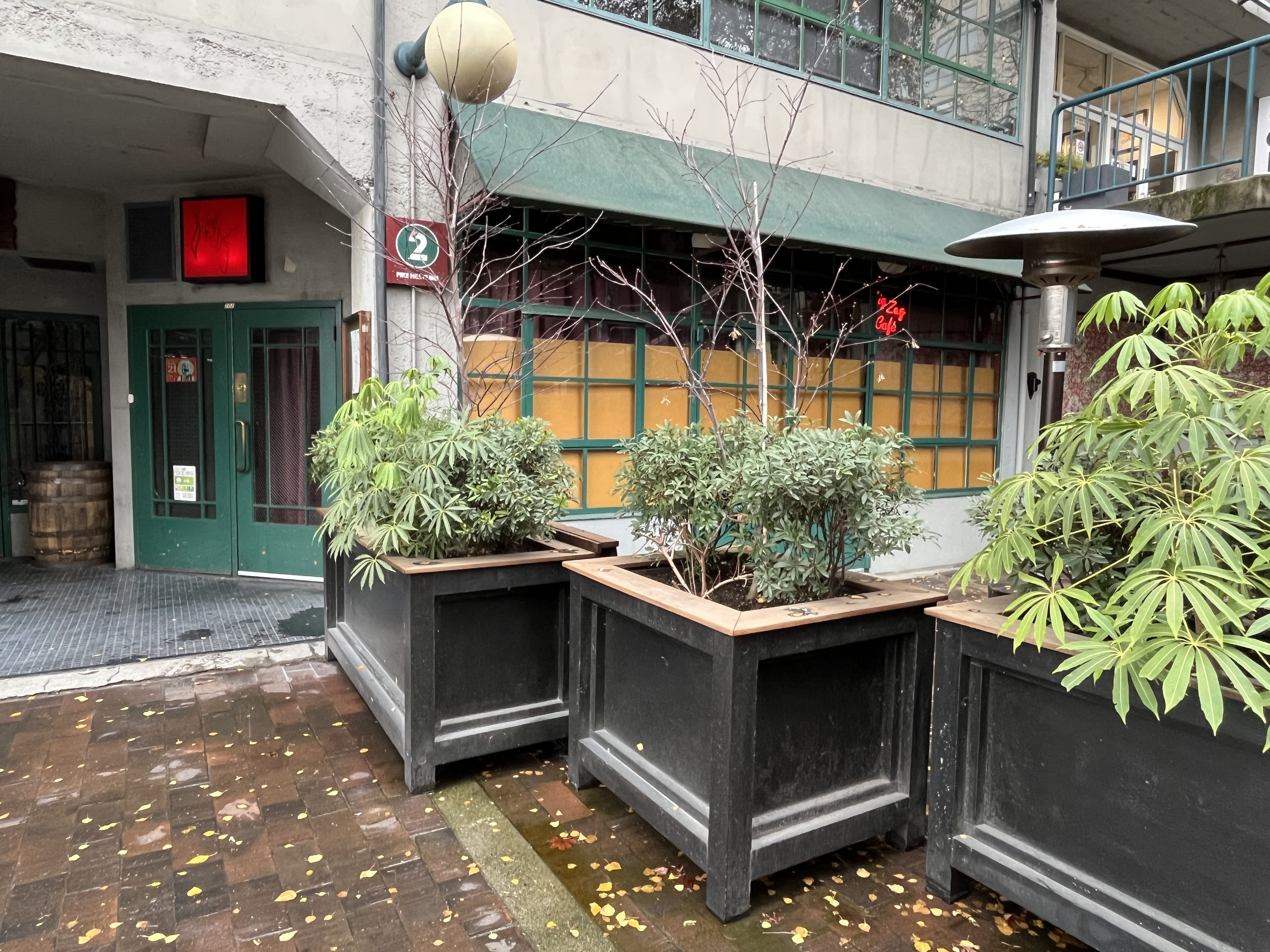
- Entrance and outdoor patio, December 2022
- Interactive map of Zig Zag Café

Restaurant information
- Established: 1999
- Owner: Ben Dougherty
- Previous owner: Kacy Fitch (with Dougherty)
- Location: 1501 Western Avenue, Seattle, Washington
- Coordinates: 47.608300°N 122.341568°W
- Website: zigzagseattle.com

Zig Zag Café is a craft cocktail bar and restaurant in Seattle, Washington. Established in 1999, the bar is considered one of the best in the United States, helping to lead the craft cocktail movement. From 2002 to 2011, noted bartender Murray Stenson worked at Zig Zag Café, and created innovative cocktails as well as reintroduced the pre-Prohibition-era Last Word cocktail to the public and to bars around the world.

== Description ==
Housed in the 1910-built Fix-Madore Building, on Western Avenue, the bar is situated on a hill beneath and behind Pike Place Market, along the Pike Street Hill Climb, a partially hidden stairwell leading down to Seattle's piers and Elliott Bay waterfront. The building is considered part of Pike Place Market, and is connected to the main market via a footbridge.

Zig Zag is dimly lit. It has tables as well as a dozen barstools, almost always filled by 5 p.m. on nights the bar opens. A small outside patio is situated outside the building as well. The bar is noted for its use of "free-pouring", or making cocktails without the use of jiggers to measure ingredients. This was bartender Murray Stenson's preference, based on decades of experience. As of 2014, the bar still free-pours its drinks, with tasting and tweaking as needed.

Zig Zag is known for serving the Last Word and the Trident cocktails. The Trident, made of caraway-forward aquavit, the bitter liqueur Cynar, dry Manzanilla sherry, and peach bitters, remains popular. Newer drinks have included the B&R, a blend of rye, Bonal, triple sec, orange and Angostura bitters; the Stiff Handshake cocktail, which has bonded bourbon, dry vermouth, triple sec, Maraschino, and decanter bitters; and Don't Give Up the Ship, which has gin, Dubonnet, Grand Marnier, and Fernet-Branca. The Charm Offensive has Irish whiskey, Jamaican rum, Carpano bianco vermouth, Green Chartreuse, and chocolate bitters, and the Saipan Sling has bourbon, Braulio, sherry, and an orange cordial. The bar also helped popularize the classic cocktail Corn'n'Oil, which includes rum, falernum, lime juice, and Angostura bitters.

== History ==
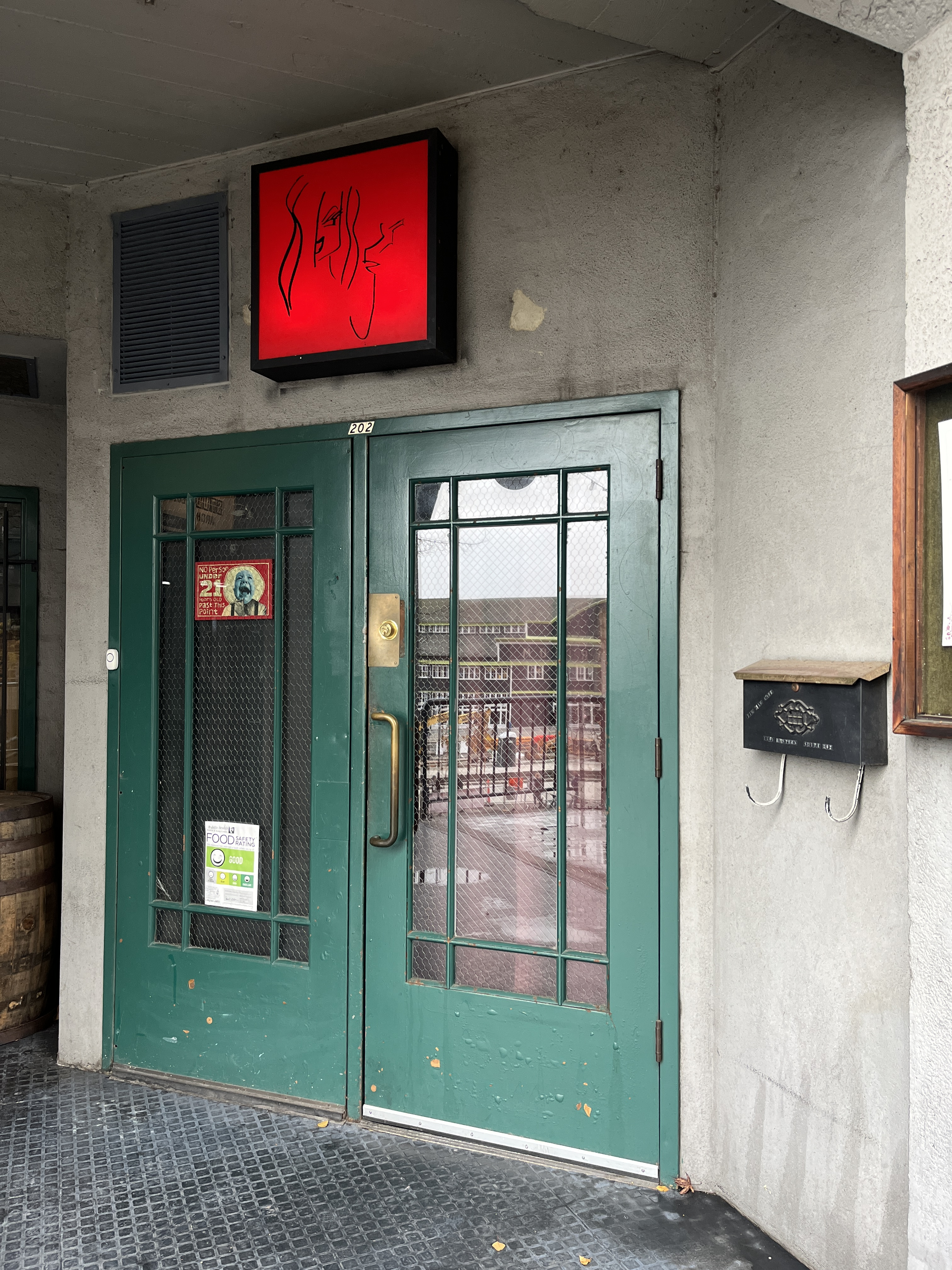
Entrance, 2022

Zig Zag Café opened in 1999, serving pizza, beer, and wine. The original owners hired Ben Dougherty and Kacy Fitch as bar managers, to lead the design and build a credible cocktail program. Dougherty and Fitch built a following there and recruited bartender Murray Stenson. In July 2002, the pair bought the bar and renovated it, hiring a consulting chef to transform Zig Zag's food menu from pizzas and calzones to a more complex menu.

Seattle cocktail enthusiast Robert Hess created the Trident, a modern classic cocktail served in bars across the country and in Europe, at Zig Zag c. 2001. Hess had the bartenders sample his invention; they enjoyed it to the degree that they kept it on their menu for years. The Last Word cocktail, a Prohibition-era drink, fell into oblivion sometime after World War II until it was rediscovered by Stenson in 2004. Stenson was looking for a new cocktail for Zig Zag, when he came across an old 1952 copy of Ted Saucier's book Bottom's Up!. Soon after being offered at Zig Zag, it became somewhat of cult hit in the Seattle and Portland areas and spread to cocktail bars in major cities worldwide. In addition its recipe reappeared in newer cocktail guides including the 2009 edition of the Mr. Boston Official Bartender's Guide.

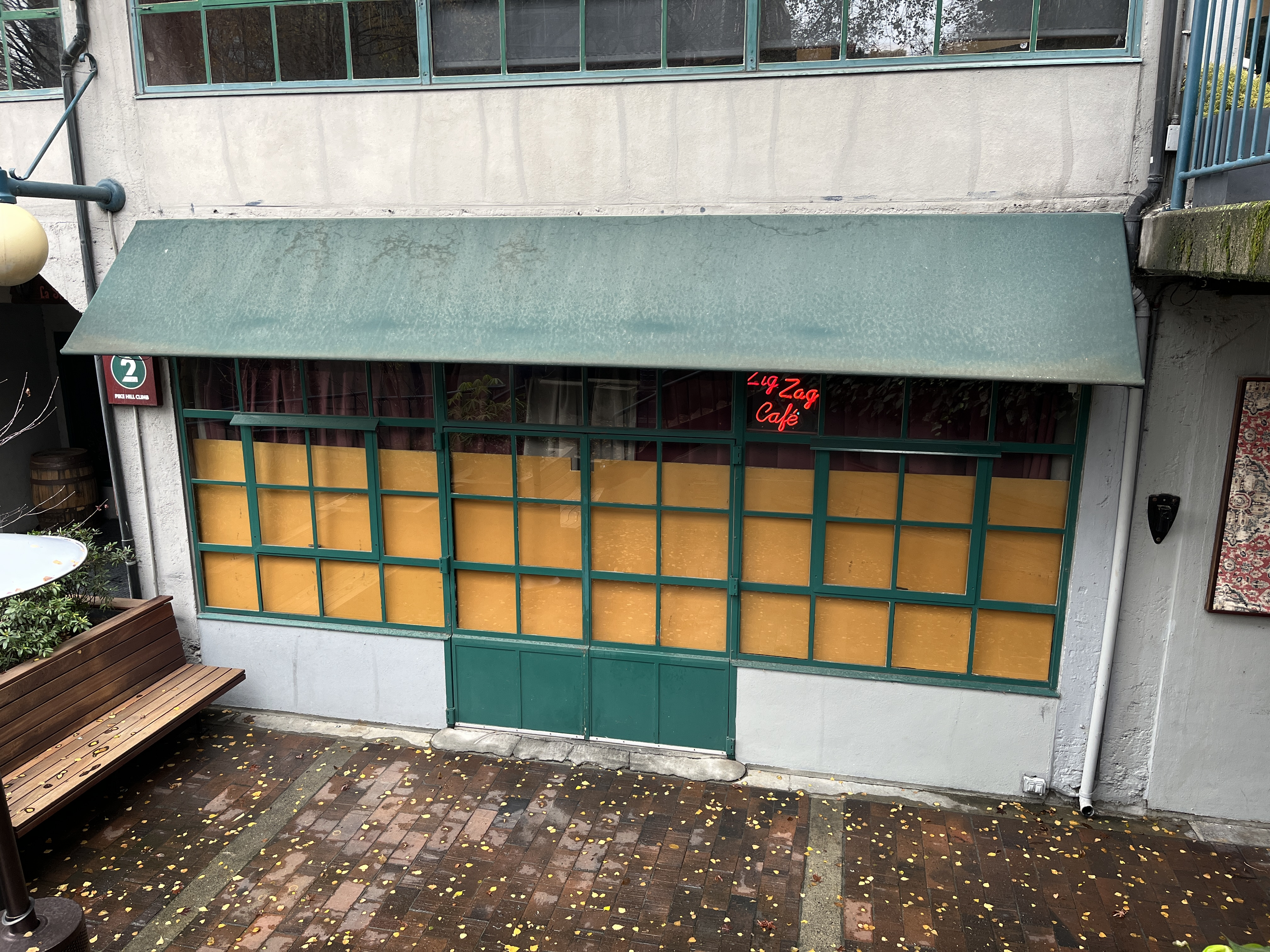
Exterior in 2022

Stenson, proclaimed the nation's top bartender in 2010, left in May 2011. He was such a part of Zig Zag that a Seattle Weekly editor visited the bar after Stenson's departure, to examine whether the business could survive. The editor, Mike Seely, reported that Zig Zag remained experimental and that the lead bartender and his team are "pretty goddamn great at what they do". In July 2012, Dougherty had a falling out with Kacy Fitch and bought out his ownership stake, thus becoming the sole owner of Zig Zag. Fitch opened his own bar in Seattle, Corner Spot, in 2018.

In 2014, following years of a relatively stagnant food menu, the bar hired chef Tyler Moritz, who released a new menu with more seasonal ingredients. The menu added pork rillete, chicken liver tartine, oysters, mushrooms, kale, and pickled ramps. Moritz had previously worked temporarily in Zig Zag's kitchen in 2012. He died in 2015 of cancer.

== Reception and legacy ==
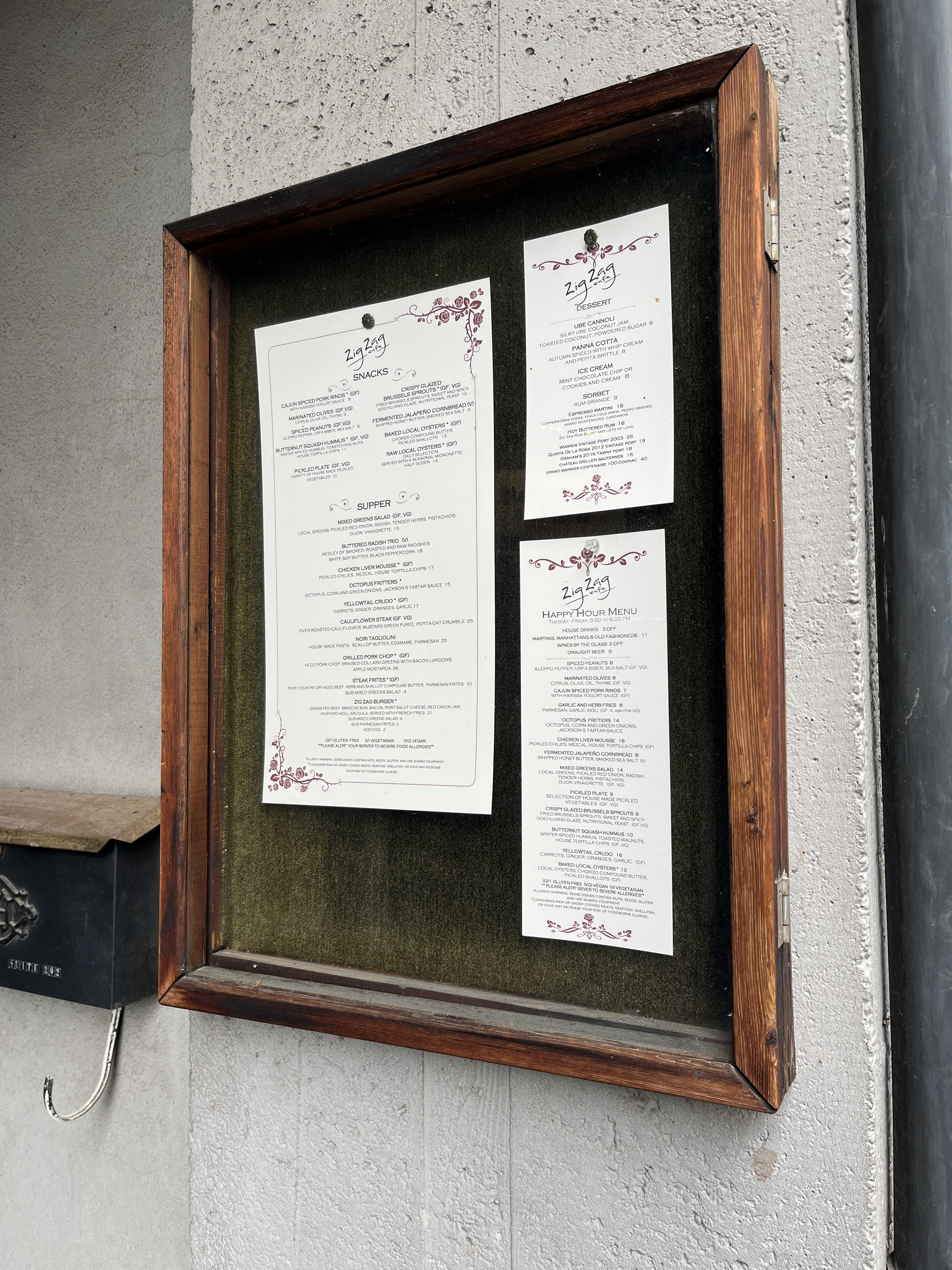
Exterior menu display, 2022

Zig Zag is considered one of the most influential in the U.S., and one of few to bring bars across the country out of a "dark age" of cocktail sophistication. The bar is considered one of the best in the U.S., and was rated as the nation's best in a list compiled by GQ in 2010. A separate list of the 25 best bars, by Men's Journal in 2012, included Zig Zag; it was the only Seattle bar on the list. Esquire named it among the best bars in the country in 2006; after a Seattle Times writer noticed it hadn't made more recent editions of the magazine's listings, Esquire clarified that it operates on a "Hall of Fame model"; that once a bar is listed, it isn't included again.

In 2011, Fodor's reviewed it as "friendly; retro without being obnoxiously ironic; and very Seattle—with the occasional live music show, to boot." Allecia Vermillion, writing for Seattle Metropolitan in 2014, opined that the bar's "cocktail credibility is unimpeachable", and that its bartenders can "turn on a dime" to give guests drinks that suit their mood. In 2003, the bar was reviewed by The Seattle Times as still needing to find its footing; the review indicated the owners seemed unable to decide whether Zig Zag was a restaurant or a lounge, and the space was largely empty during dinnertime hours.

The bar has seen numerous prolific and influential bartenders work there, and who went on to other significant venues. These include Stenson, who left Zig Zag to work at Michael Mina's RN74 Seattle; former co-owner Fitch, who opened the Corner Spot bar in Seattle in 2018; and Erik Hakkinen, who opened Roquette, a Parisian-style bar that opened in Seattle in 2020.

== See also ==
- List of restaurants in Pike Place Market
