= Audrey Saunders =

American bartender

Audrey Saunders (born 1962) is an American bartender, considered one of the world's most famous bartenders. She is most well known as the operating partner and creative lead of Pegu Club, a bar in New York City from 2005 to 2020. The bar was one of the most influential in the United States. Since its closure, Saunders and her husband have been developing a retreat for beverage industry members in rural Washington state.

== Life ==
Audrey Saunders was born in 1962 to Swiss parents, and grew up in Port Washington, on the north shore of Long Island in New York state. She grew up appreciating the cocktail world from the Thin Man series, where detectives Nick and Nora Charles solved crimes while enjoying gin martinis. She entered the bartending industry later in her life, after co-founding a corporate cleaning business, Contract Services of America. Her first bartending job was at the Waterfront Alehouse in Brooklyn. She began to train herself there, and early on, she met Dale DeGroff, the head bartender at the Rainbow Room. DeGroff was teaching a bar business class for NYU's continuing education program; she approached him after class, asking to work for free in order to learn high-end bartending from him. She helped him with charity events for several years. In 1999, she became lead bartender for Waldy Malouf's Beacon Restaurant in New York City. After two years, she became a manager at Tonic, a bar and restaurant in Chelsea. After Tonic closed in 2001, DeGroff hired her as bar manager of Bemelmans Bar, in the Carlyle Hotel. Saunders excelled at her job there, and was approached to be an operating partner and the creative talent for the Pegu Club bar.

Saunders pioneered creating sophisticated drinks, after decades of craft cocktail knowledge being discarded. Some of Saunder's inventions, like the Old Cuban and Gin-Gin Mule, have become seen as classic cocktails.

Saunders founded and "personified" the Pegu Club, a bar in New York City, which operated from 2005 to 2020. The bar is considered one of the most influential in the United States, and was considered a center of the craft cocktail movement. It closed in 2020, amid the COVID-19 pandemic, an expiring lease, a likely rent hike, an expensive plumbing issue, and other obstacles that come along with operating a bar in New York City.

While at the Pegu Club, Saunders spread the Nick & Nora glass (named after the aforementioned detectives) to other bars, and it became a key part of the glassware at her own bar. Saunders served classic martinis in the glass, attempting to break preconceptions that larger drinks are better. Other bars followed her lead, including Please Don't Tell and Death & Co., both in the East Village in Manhattan.

At the Pegu Club, Saunders trained many people now considered some of the top bartenders, including Jim Meehan of Please Don't Tell and Phil Ward, of Mayahuel. Saunders also pioneered a practice at the Pegu Club for guests to adjust drinks at their table, by placing small bottles of simple syrup, juices, and bitters beside the guests.

In 2021, Saunders contributed as an area editor to The Oxford Companion to Spirits & Cocktails.

Saunders has been married to noted cocktail aficionado Robert Hess since 2011. Hess and Saunders are developing the Ravenwood Beverage Institute, a retreat dedicated to the craft cocktail movement, on their property in rural Washington.

== See also ==
- List of bartenders
