= Earl Rose (composer) =

American composer (b. 1946)

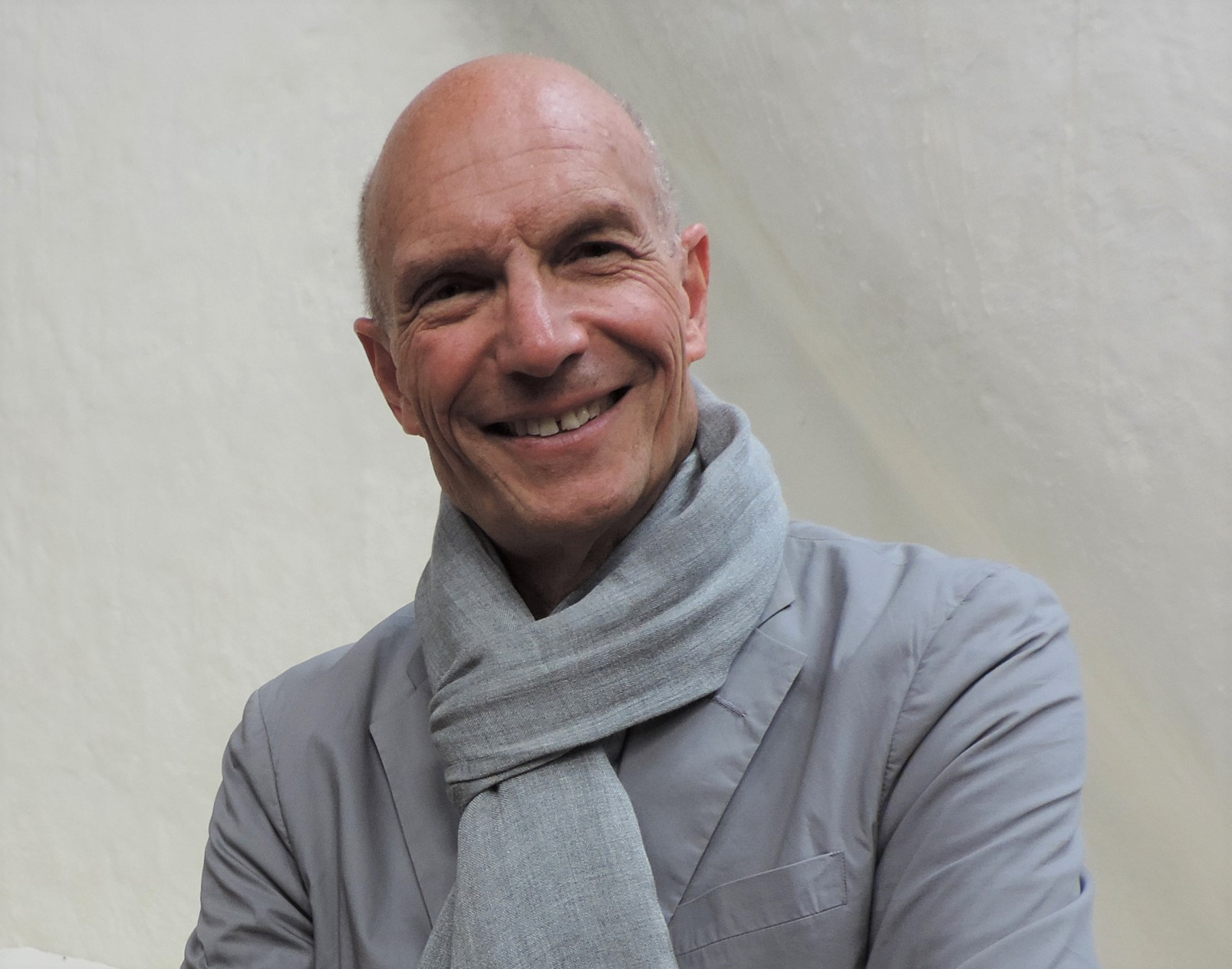
- Earl Rose in 2012
- Born: Earl Alexander Rose; September 5, 1946 (age 80); New York City
- Occupations: Composer; pianist; conductor

Earl Alexander Rose (born September 5, 1946) is an American composer, pianist, arranger, and conductor. In addition to writing film and television music, he has also composed several well-known Pop and R&B songs. His film scores include Alan Pakula:Going For Truth, Always at the Carlyle, Johnny Carson: King of Late Night, a PBS American Masters presentation, and the Peabody Winning documentary, Inventing L.A.: The Chandlers and Their Times.

== Early life ==
Earl Rose was born in New York City and began taking music and began his music and piano instruction at the age of seven years old. He attended and, having studied with Frances Dillon and Edith Oppens, graduated with a major in piano from Mannes College of Music of Music in 1970. During his second year of college, he studied at the Vienna Academy of Music. He also conducted at the Juilliard School.

== Life and career ==
Rose began his composing and conducting career in the late sixties, while still in college, as Assistant Music Conductor for NBC's The Tonight Show starring Johnny Carson, when the show was based in New York. He continued a part-time affiliation with the show until Carson's departure in 1992. One of his first television composing credits, beginning in 1976, was co-writing songs with lyricist Judy Spencer for the CBS television series, Captain Kangaroo. In 1981, he composed the score for the television movie, Thin Ice. In 1986, he was the composer for the ABC television Dick Cavett Show.From 1990 to 1995 Rose was the composer for ABC television's Ryan's Hope series and from 1990 to 1995 he was the composer for ABC’s All My Children series.

Beginning in 2002, Rose composed scores for over a dozen History Channel and A&E Television documentaries and mini-series, including Masada, Wake Island: Alamo of the Pacific, The Presidents, Remember the Alamo, and In The Shadow Of Cold Mountain. In 1996, Rose began composing the scores for documentary films written and directed by Peter Jones. These include Ballyhoo: The Hollywood Sideshow, Stardust: The Bette Davis Story, Inventing L.A.: The Chandlers and Their Times, and Johnny Carson: King of Late Night.

Earl can be seen performing his original music in such films as, No Hard Feelings, Sofia Coppola’s On the Rocks, Garry Marshall’s NewYear’s Eve, the Netflix series, Partner Track, and HBO’ s Love Life.

His music has been featured in many TV shows including The Goldbergs, Call Me Kat, American Woman, Shameless, The Brave, The Magicians, Pan Am, The West Wing, ER, Sex and the City. In 2008, he was the pianist for the TV special, A Colbert Christmas: The Greatest Gift of All, accompanying Elvis Costello, Jon Stewart and Stephen Colbert.

Rose's other film score credits include Mad Dog Time, directed by Larry Bishop, and original music featured in About Schmidt, White Oleander, and Gunshy. He wrote the song arrangements for The Object of My Affection.

Rose's songwriting and recording credits include co-writing "Right From the Heart", recorded by Johnny Mathis, "Every Beat of My Heart", co-written and recorded by Brian McKnight, "I Found Love", co-written and recorded by Peabo Bryson, and the Emmy Winning and platinum-selling song, "Love Is A Gift", recorded by Olivia Newton-John and co-written with Victoria Shaw and Olivia Newton-John.

Rose has received numerous accolades for his music, including winning a Daytime Emmy Award, 13 Emmy nominations, and a News and Documentary Emmy Award nomination. He has also won three ASCAP awards for his music being the most performed on television.

As a conductor and pianist, Rose's guest appearances have included the Pacific Symphony, Jacksonville Symphony, Corpus Christi Symphony, Erie Philharmonic, Lubbock Symphony and the San Angelo Symphony. In addition, during the 1990 to 1991 concert season, he performed in and conducted the Columbia Artist Festival's concert presentation, The Irving Berlin Century, in 106 US cities.

For the last twenty nine years he has performed a residency as a pianist in Bemelmans Bar at the Carlyle Hotel in New York City.

== Awards and nominations ==
=== News and Documentary Emmy Awards ===
Qualification	Title	Year
Nominated Emmy	Outstanding Individual Achievement in a Craft: Music and Sound for Wake Island: Alamo of the Pacific History Channel	

\ 2004

=== Daytime Emmy Awards ===
Qualification	Title	Year
Nominated	Outstanding Achievement in Music Direction and Composition for a Drama Series for As the World Turns	2000
Nominated	Outstanding Original Song for As the World Turns for the song "You Are (Where I Belong)"	1999
Won Daytime Emmy Awards	Outstanding Original Song for As the World Turns for the song "This Is Our Moment". Tied with General Hospital.	1999
Nominated Daytime Emmy	Outstanding Achievement in Musical Direction and Composition for a Drama Series for As the World Turns	1998
Nominated Daytime Emmy Awards	Outstanding Original Song for All My Children for the song "I Found Love" 1997 Daytime Emmy Awards Nominated, Daytime Emmy Outstanding Original Song for As the World Turns (1956) 1995 Daytime Emmy Awards Nominated, Daytime Emmy Outstanding Original Song for As the World Turns (1956) === ASCAP Film and Television Music Awards === : Qualification / Title / Date; Won / Most Performed Underscore / 1994; Won / Most Performed Underscore / 1993	1993
Nominated Daytime Emmy Awards	Outstanding Achievement in Music Direction and Composition for a Drama Series for Another World	1991
Nominated	Outstanding Achievement in Music Direction and Composition for ABC Afterschool Special for episode "My Dad Can't Be Crazy... Can He? (#18.1)"	1990
Nominated	Outstanding Achievement in Music Direction and Composition for a Drama Series for Ryan's Hope	1989

1988

Daytime Emmy Awards Nominated, Daytime Emmy Outstanding Achievement in Music Direction and Composition for a Drama Series for Ryan's Hope (1975)

1986 Daytime Emmy Awards Nominated, Daytime Emmy Outstanding Achievement in Music Direction and Composition for a Drama Series for Ryan's Hope (1975)

== Film credits ==
Film title	Date
Always at the Carlyle	2018
New Year's Eve	2011
Inventing L.A.: The Chandlers and Their Times	2009
Gunshy	1998
Mad Dog Time	1996

== Television credits ==
Show Title	Date
Angeleno	2015
Carson on TCM	2013–2014
Ryan's Hope	1983–1989
Thin Ice	1981
My Dad Can't Be Crazy, Can He?	1989
Hard Times for an American Girl: The Great Depression	2009
WWII in HD: The Air War	2010
70's Fever	2008
Joe And Max	
Sesame Street	2007
Biography: James Woods	2007
Stardust: The Bette Davis Story	2006
Secret Missions of the Civil War	2005
The presidents	2005
Countdown To Armageddon	2004
Rescue at Dawn: The Los Banos Raid	2004
Nazi Spies in America	2004
In The shadow of Cold Mountain	2003
Remember the Alamo	2003
Nostradamus: 500 Years Later	
Modern Marvels: Convertibles	2003
Wake Island: Alamo of the Pacific	
Masada	2002
Sex And World War II	2002
The Dick Cavett Show	1986

== Recordings ==
As a pianist, Rose has recorded for Gramavision Records, Columbia Records, Varese-Sarabande Records, Piano Disc, Steinway MPL Music Publishing, Inc. And his own label, Amadeus Music Company. These recordings include Cole Porter on A Steinway, Chill Piano, In My Life (The Beatles on A Steinway, Hello, Solo, Color, Rhythm and Magic: favorite Songs From Disney Classics, Take My Breath Away, Earl Rose Plays Burt Bacharach, Great Movie Themes, Guys and Dolls, and New Standards.

His soundtrack recordings include Stardust: The Bette Davis Story, Inventing L.A.: The Chandlers and Their Times, Johnny Carson: King Of Late Night, and Always At The Carlyle, and Alan Pakula :Going For Truth.

As an arranger, he arranged Audra McDonald's recording of "You Were Meant For Me", featured in the film The Object of My Affection.
