= Detroit Athletic Club =

Private club in Michigan, United States

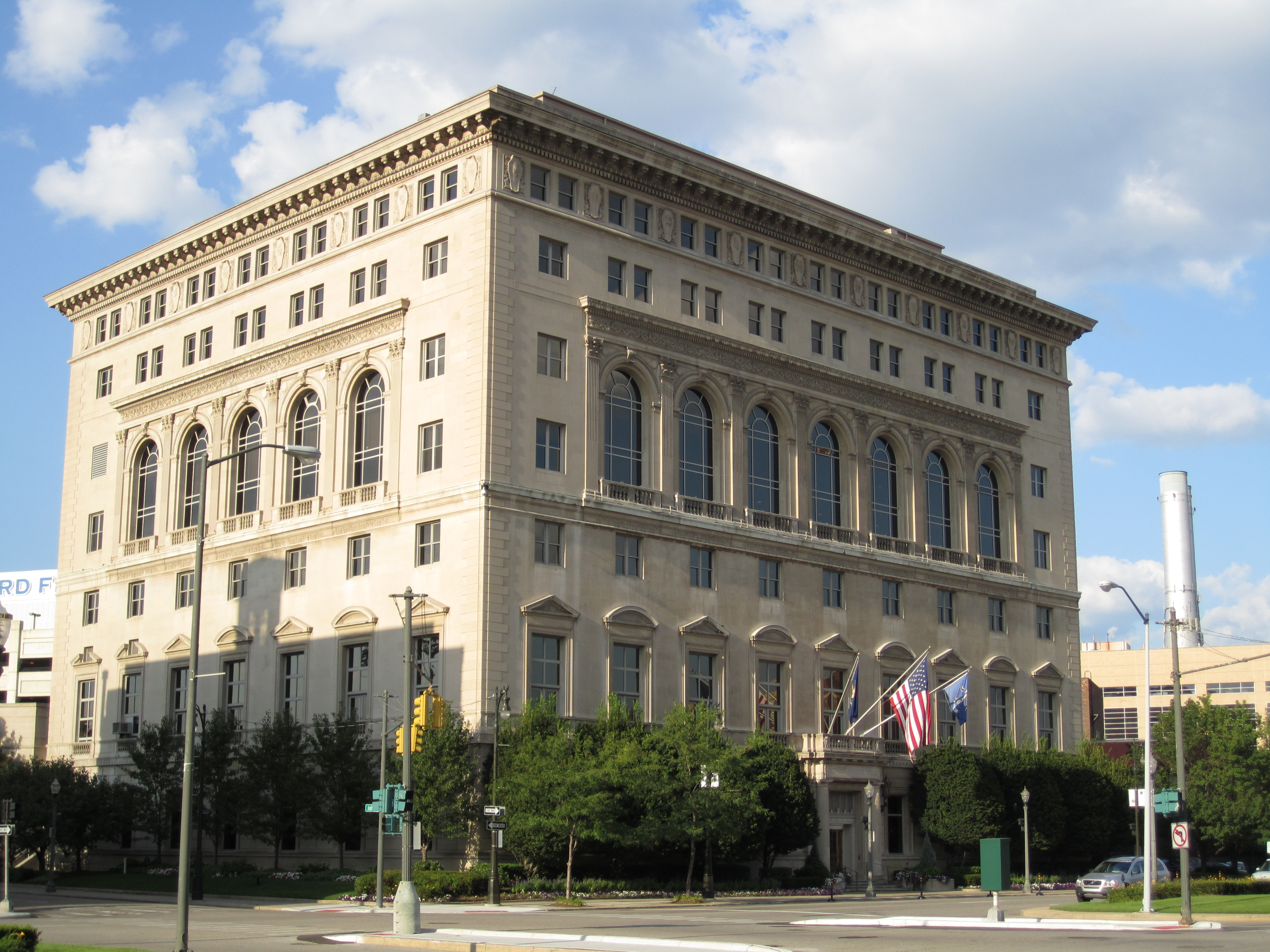
- Interactive map of the Detroit Athletic Club area

General information
- Type: private club
- Architectural style: Neo-Renaissance style
- Location: 241 Madison Street; Detroit, Michigan 48226
- Coordinates: 42.337468°N 83.047355°W
- Completed: 1915, 2012

Technical details
- Floor count: 7

Design and construction
- Architect: Albert Kahn

The Detroit Athletic Club (often referred to as the DAC) is a private social club and athletic club located in the heart of Detroit's theater, sports, and entertainment district. It is located across the street from Detroit's historic Music Hall. The clubhouse was designed by Albert Kahn and inspired by Rome's Palazzo Farnese. It maintains reciprocal agreements at other private clubs worldwide. It contains full-service athletic facilities, pools, restaurants, ballrooms, and guest rooms.

Members of the club include business professionals and professional athletes. Ty Cobb is among the athletes to have been a member of the DAC. The building is visible beyond center field from Comerica Park.

The club is governed under laws for 501(c)(7) Social and Recreation Clubs; in 2024 it claimed total revenue of $47,273,566 and total assets of $89,680,222. The Detroit Athletic Club Foundation at the same address is a 501(c)(3) Public Charity. In 2024 it claimed $1,176,130 in total revenue and $5,937,479 in assets, with total giving of $587,428.

== History ==
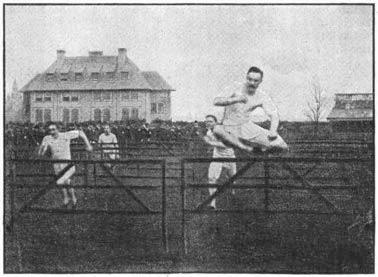
A track and field event at the Detroit Athletic Club in 1888

The Detroit Athletic Club was founded in 1887 to encourage amateur athletic activities, and built a clubhouse with a tract in what is now Detroit's Cultural Center.

=== Reorienting ===
Henry Bourne Joy, son of the man who built the Michigan Central Railroad into one of the nation's most successful large railroads, served as president of the Packard Motor Car Company in the early decades of the twentieth century. He felt that the rich new titans of the booming automobile industry spent too much time in the Woodward Avenue pubs. He thought they needed a club commensurate with this stature. Some 26 years after the club's founding, on January 4, 1913, Joy and 108 other leading Detroit citizens came together to reorient the Detroit Athletic Club. Joy and his colleagues selected Detroit's most accomplished architect, Albert Kahn.

== Architecture ==
In 1912, Kahn visited Italy, and was inspired by the buildings he saw there. Two of Detroit's most impressive current downtown edifices—the Detroit Athletic Club and the Police Department headquarters on Beaubien—reflect what Kahn saw in Italy. The Palazzo Borghese in Rome provided Kahn with a model for much of the Detroit Athletic Club, but the idea of using the large impressive windows for the impressive fourth floor dining room—called the Grill Room—came from the Palazzo Farnese.

=== Remodeling ===
In the 1990s, the membership devoted substantial funding to a major refurbishing of the attractive building.

A. Duncan Carse created paintings to decorate the Detroit Athletic Club. The paintings were covered at the club but they were on show again after a remodeling of the club in 1999.

== Athletics ==
Over the years, the Detroit Athletic Club has provided financial assistance and training opportunities for a number of amateur athletes preparing for the Olympic Games.

At the 1956 U.S. Olympic Team Trials, springboard divers Jeanne Stunyo of Gary, Indiana and Mackenzie High School graduate Barbara Gilders-Dudeck were sponsored by the DAC.

Stunyo and Gilders-Dudeck qualified for the Summer Olympic Games in Melbourne, Australia. At the Games, Jeanne Stunyo won the springboard diving silver medal, and Barbara Gilders-Dudeck finished in fourth place—less than one point from a bronze medal.

== Contribution to cocktail history ==
The Last Word, a gin-based, prohibition-era cocktail, was originally developed at the Detroit Athletic Club. The first publication in which the Last Word appeared was Ted Saucier's 1951 cocktail book Bottoms Up!. In it Saucier states that the cocktail was first served around 30 years earlier at the Detroit Athletic Club. A research in the archives of the Detroit Athletic Club by John Frizell revealed later that the drink was slightly older predating the prohibition era by a few years. It was already offered on the club's 1916 menu for a price of 35 cents (equivalent to $10.36 in 2025), making it the club's most expensive cocktail at the time.

The drink eventually fell out of favor. It enjoyed a renewed popularity after being rediscovered by the bartender Murray Stenson in 2003 during his tenure at the Zig Zag Café. It became a cult hit in the Seattle and Portland areas and spread to cocktail bars in major cities worldwide, ultimately spawning several variations.

== See also ==
- 1956 Summer Olympics
- List of American gentlemen's clubs
- Sports in Detroit
