= Murray Stenson =

American bartender (1949–2023)

- Born: July 29, 1949; Colville, Washington, U.S.
- Died: September 22, 2023 (aged 74)
- Occupation: Bartender

Murray Russell Stenson (July 29, 1949 – September 22, 2023) was an American bartender in Seattle, Washington. Stenson was an instrumental figure in the cocktail renaissance of the early 21st century, most notably behind the bar at the Zig Zag Café where he reintroduced the pre-Prohibition cocktail Last Word. In 2010, Stenson was named "Best Bartender in America" by Tales of the Cocktail.

== Life and career ==
Stenson was born in Colville, Washington, and grew up in the Seattle suburb of Kirkland. After dropping out of Shoreline Community College, he worked a series of service jobs before being hired as a bartender at a Seattle restaurant called Benjamin's. He was dissatisfied with what The New York Times called "the sickly sweet [cocktail] concoctions of the 1970s", and began reforming the bar's drink offerings with new ingredients and styles.

Stenson later worked at Il Bistro and the Zig Zag Cafe, where his reputation grew among cocktail enthusiasts from the 1990s onward, and lifted the profiles of each establishment. He left the Zig Zag Cafe in 2011, unfavorably comparing it to Disneyland due to the amount of attention he attracted; he explained in a 2020 interview that he "only ever saw [himself] as a bartender" and disliked the fame. He worked for short stints at a variety of establishments thereafter, before retiring due to poor health and the COVID-19 pandemic.

== Personal life and death ==
Stenson was married to Cynthia Carson from 1980 until divorcing in 1982, and to Antonia Busto from 1982 until divorcing in 1984. He had two children. Stenson died from complications of Guillain–Barré syndrome at his home in Seattle on September 22, 2023, at the age of 74.
