= Pegu Club =

Coordinates: 16.786964°N 96.142908°E

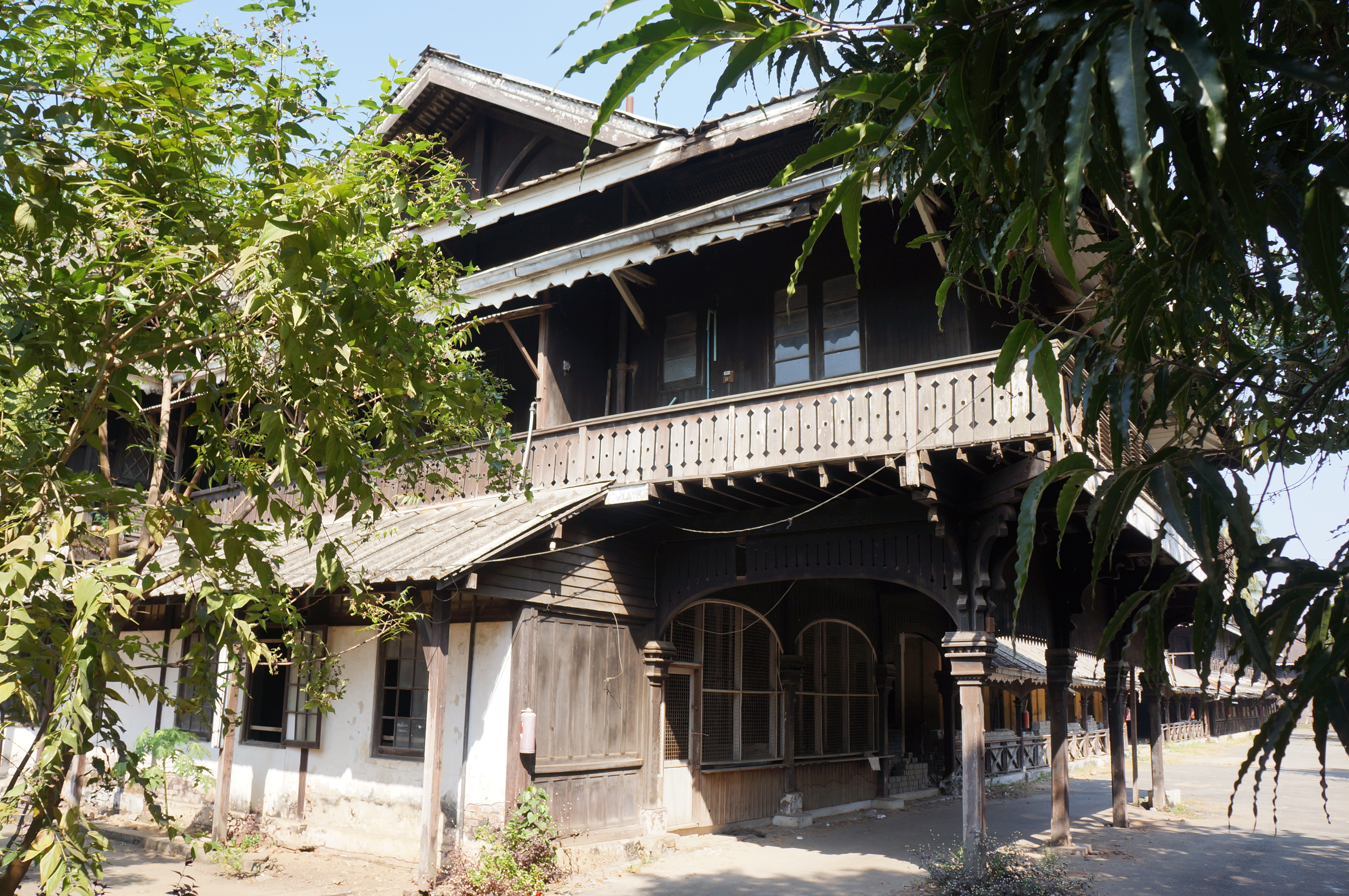
Former Pegu Club main building

Pegu Club (Burmese: ပဲခူးကလပ်) is a recognized heritage site in Yangon, Myanmar, which was a Victorian-style Gentlemen's club founded in 1871 during the British colonization of Burma. The building was built in 1880 and finished in 1882. Pegu Club used to be a place for British officials to spend their time for a drink or two. It was well known because of its signature Pegu Club Cocktail. In southeast Asia, Pegu Club was an equivalent place to the Royal Selangor Club of Kuala Lumpur and The Tanglin Club of Singapore. Rudyard Kipling, as a young newspaperman, visited Pegu Club when he was in Yangon in 1889. Paul Theroux visited Pegu Club in the early 1970s and wrote about it in his book The Great Railway Bazaar. The first phase of the Pegu Club's restoration was completed in 2018.

== History ==
=== Establishment ===
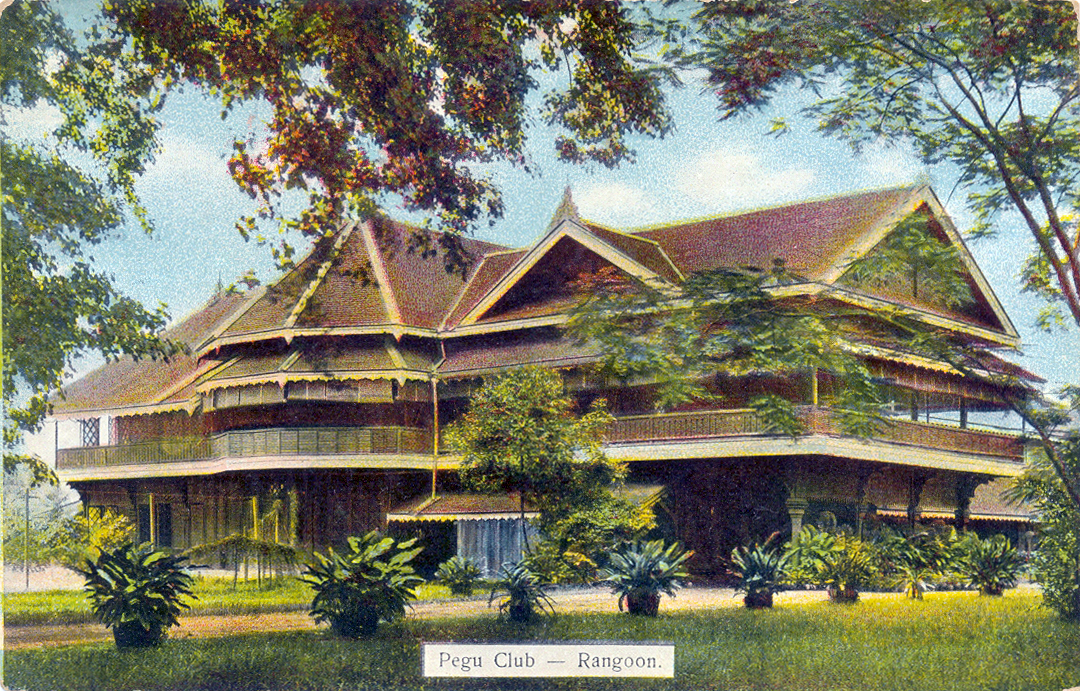
Pegu Club postcard from 1910

Pegu Club was first established in 1880s and it was originally founded in 1871. The club was located originally on Ma Naw Hari Street which was called Cheape Road during the colonial times. In 1882, membership exceeded the capacity of the clubhouse and the club moved to the current location at the corner of Pyay, Zagawar and Padonmar Roads, right across from the embassy of Russia in Yangon. The name Pegu Club was mentioned in The Imperial Gazetteer of India of 1909 which officiated the name.

=== British colonial era ===
During the British occupation of Myanmar, Pegu Club served as a place for the British officers and administrators. According to Rudyard Kipling, who spent his night at Pegu Club during his visit to Yangon, Pegu Club was famously known as the only place in Yangon that sold mutton at that time.

During the colonial period, membership was limited to Caucasians only even though the text says "all gentlemen with interest in general society".

=== Japanese era ===
In 1942, the Imperial Japanese Army took over the country from the British and claimed Pegu Club as its property. Calling the club a "comfort station," Pegu Club became a brothel for the army men. Under Japanese rule, the Japanese also did not allow local Burmese inside the club except for a few exceptions. After the country's independence in 1948, the place was abandoned and taken over by the Burmese army (Tatmadaw).

=== Military rule ===
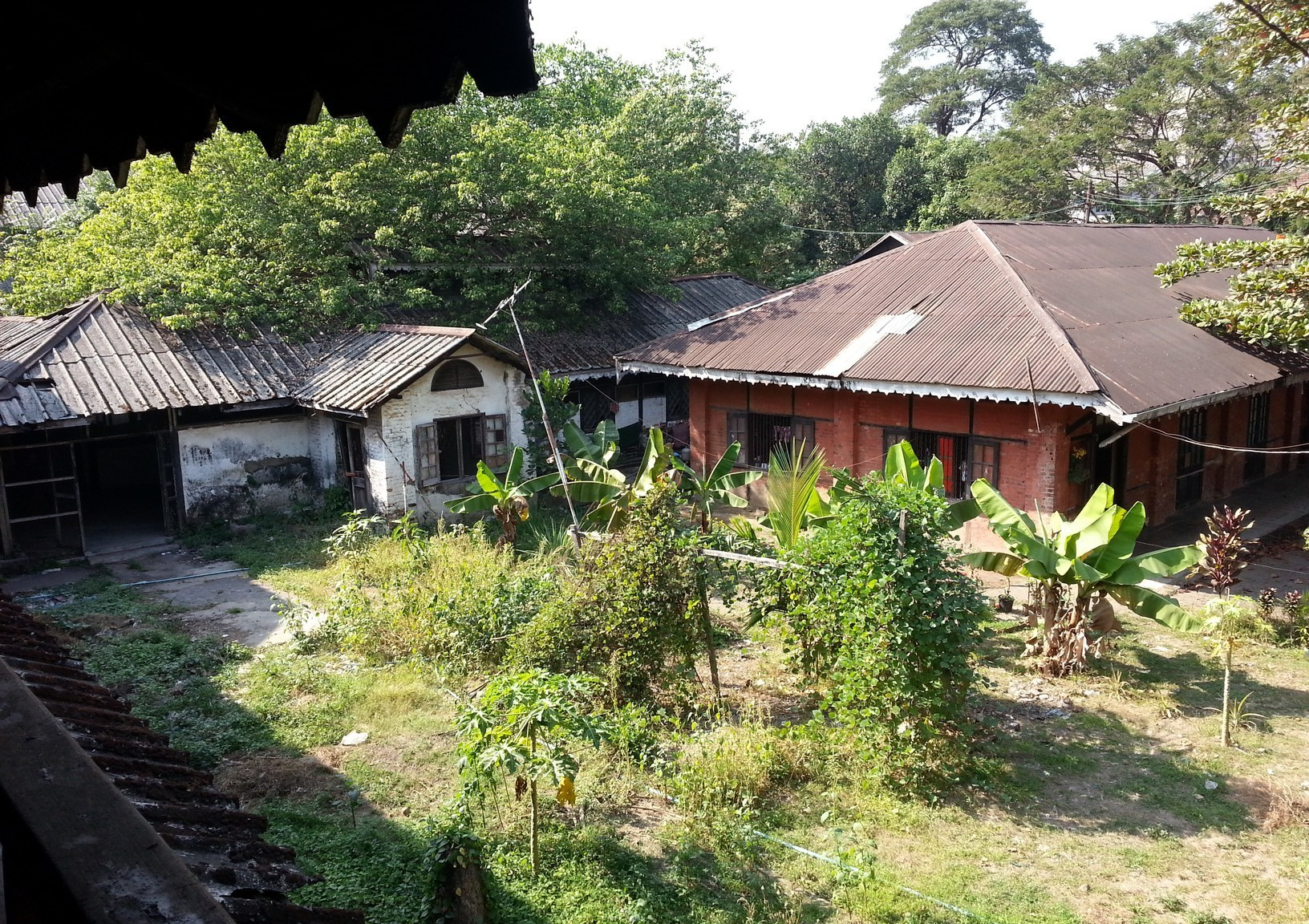
Pegu Club Courtyard before its Renovation

After independence, the military used the compound as a tax office until Myanmar became socialist in 1962 and nationalized the premises. The main building became a pension office while surrounding buildings housed government officials and their families. The compound was then abandoned after the state capital moved to Naypyidaw in 2002.

==== 2010s ====
In 2017, the Burmese military awarded KT Group with a 50-year build-operate-transfer agreement for Pegu Club, with payments going to an off-budget Ministry of Defence account. KT Group pays a military conglomerate at least US$510,000 in annual dues.

In 2018, the first phase of restoration was undertaken to serve as a multi-purpose event venue by KT Group, the Beaumont Partnership and Yangon Heritage Trust. The second phase is planned for the near future. The Pegu Club building received a Blue Plaque from Yangon Heritage Trust.

== Compound ==
The compound has the main clubhouse, the Prince of Wales Great Hall, three gardens and the residential area with tennis courts. The Great Hall was built in anticipation of the Prince of Wales in 1922.

Constructed of teak wood, the main clubhouse was built to withstand the heat. It has louvered doors and windows at the upstairs living quarters allowing cross-ventilation. The building has high ceilings and the carriageway and carriage porch are separated—showcasing the high social status of the building.

== Pegu Club Cocktail ==
Pegu Club cocktail was first introduced in the 1920s. The cocktail became popular in the 1930s when it was featured in The Savoy Cocktail Book. In Yangon, the Pegu Club cocktail is available in the Strand Hotel, The Governor's Residence, and as of 2018, at the original Pegu Club.

=== Recipe ===
- 2 ounces London dry gin
- ¾ ounce lime juice
- ¾ ounce orange curacao
- A dash of Angostura bitters
- A dash of orange bitters

== Reincarnation ==
=== Pegu Club in New York City ===
In New York City SoHo District, a bar was opened in 2005 named after the Pegu Club serving the Pegu Club cocktail. It closed in 2020 as a result of reduced business due to the COVID-19 pandemic. The bar helped lead the craft cocktail movement.

=== Pegu Club: The Game ===
A start-up table-top game studio called Burmah Games is now developing a partial fictional board game inspired by the Pegu Club. The game is based on the alternate version of 19th century Rangoon, featuring cards based on historical location. The game is designed by Naing Lin Kyaw with the art of Zune Ei Htet and Sai Laung Linn.

== See also ==
- Pegu Club (cocktail)
- Bago, Myanmar
