= Johnny Carson: King of Late Night =

2012 PBS documentary about Johnny Carson

Johnny Carson: King of Late Night is a documentary film by two-time Emmy-winning filmmaker Peter Jones about the life of American television talk show host Johnny Carson. It is narrated by Kevin Spacey, and aired on PBS on May 14, 2012, as part of their American Masters series. Johnny Carson: King of Late Night is a co-production of Peter Jones Productions, Inc. and THIRTEEN’S American Masters for WNET.

The film received two Emmy Award nominations for Outstanding Writing Nonfiction Programming and Outstanding Picture Editing Nonfiction Programming. It was also nominated by the Writers Guild of America in the Television Documentary category.

== Synopsis ==
The film features 45 original interviews with Carson's friends, family, and colleagues. Interviewees include David Letterman, Jay Leno, Jerry Seinfeld, Jimmy Fallon, Ray Romano, Drew Carey, Steve Martin, Ellen DeGeneres, and Bob Newhart.

Carson rarely gave interviews and remained a very private man, despite his public persona. He once revealed, “I can get in front of an audience and be in control... Offstage, I’m aloof because I’m not very comfortable.” The documentary explores this dichotomy and enigma, unearthing clues about Carson's childhood, early days in the business, and personal and professional life.

== Production ==
=== Access ===
For 15 years, Jones wrote an annual letter to Carson requesting his permission and cooperation in production of the documentary. Carson called Jones in 2003 and said, “You write a damn fine letter, Peter, but I don’t have anything more to say.” Jones stated that he also made documentaries about Carson's personal idols, Jack Benny and Edgar Bergen, in part, to get the attention of Johnny Carson. When Carson made the initial phone call to Jones in 2003 he made a point of telling him that he appreciated the films about Bergen and Benny.

Following Carson's death in 2005, Jones began directing his letters to Carson's nephew, Jeff Sotzing, who controls his uncle's archives. In 2010, Sotzing agreed to cooperate and the Carson Entertainment Group granted Jones access to Johnny's personal and professional archives, including family photo albums, home movies, memorabilia, and all existing episodes of The Tonight Show from 1962 until his retirement in 1992. Carson's personal archive, which is preserved in an underground vault in Kansas, holds more than 3,500 hours of tape that have now been digitized.

Sotzing has said that his reasoning for granting this kind of access was because, “he didn’t want people to forget about Johnny Carson”.

=== Approach ===
Filmmaker Peter Jones stated that he wanted to find clues to Johnny's character and his past from actual moments on The Tonight Show itself. Jones claims that Johnny revealed things about himself on the show that he felt uncomfortable sharing in his “real” life.

Jones pulled clips from The Tonight Show that were entertaining, but also revealed something specific about him as a performer or person. His other priority in making the film was to rely on first-hand memories and reflections from those that were closest to him.
