= Old Cuban =

Type of cocktail

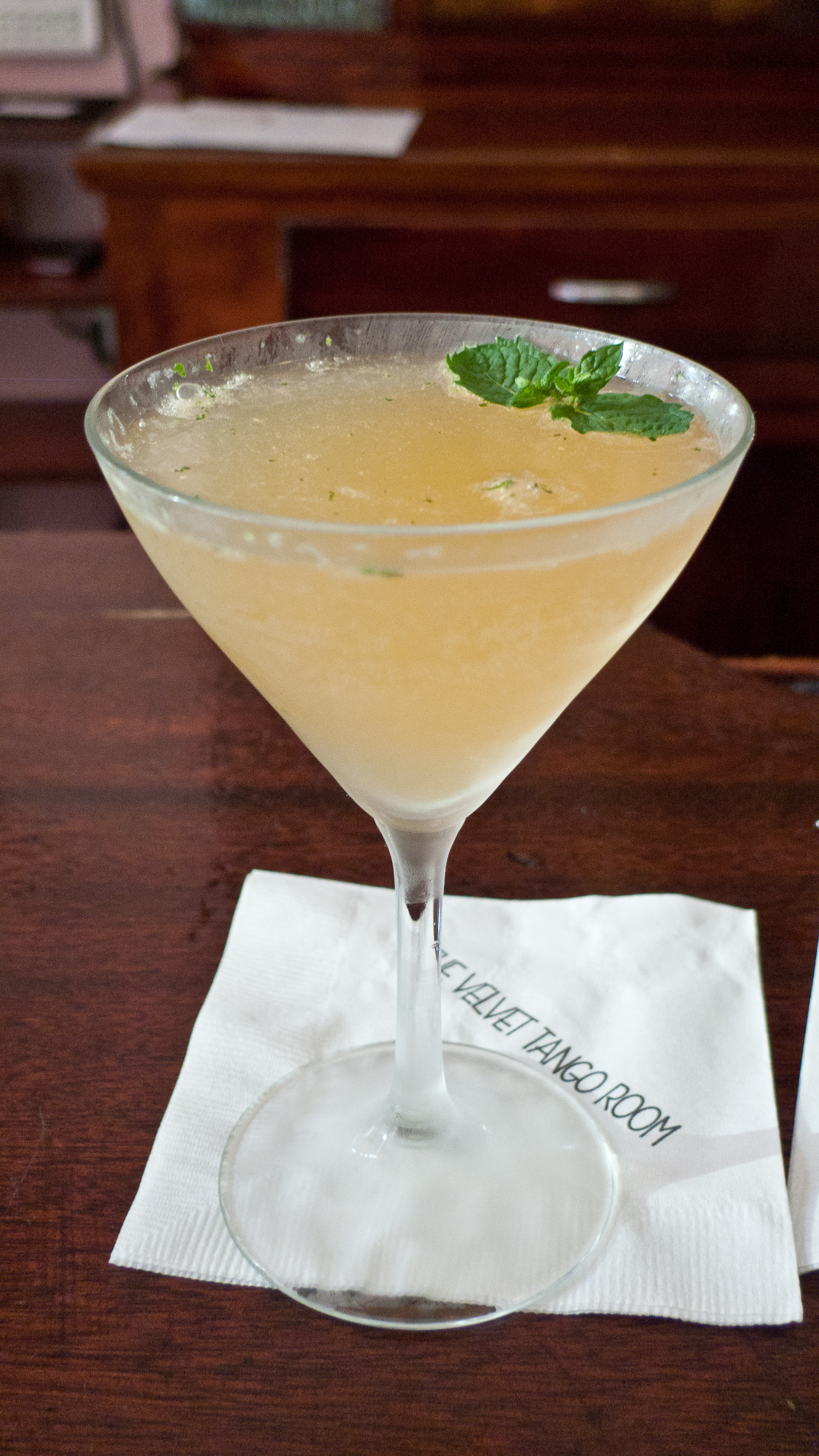
- Type: Cocktail
- Ingredients: 4.5 cl aged rum; 2.25 cl fresh lime juice; 3 cl simple syrup; 2 dashes Angostura bitters; 6 to 8 mint leaves; 6 cl cava brut or champagne brut, if need be Prosecco
- Base spirit: Rum
- Standard drinkware: Cocktail glass
- Standard garnish: Mint sprigs
- Served: Straight up: chilled, without ice
- Preparation: Pour all ingredients except the wine into cocktail shaker, shake well with ice, strain into chilled elegant cocktail glass. Top up with the sparkling wine and garnish with mint sprigs

The Old Cuban was created in 2001 by mixologist Audrey Saunders. It is also an IBA official cocktail.

== See also ==
- List of cocktails
