= Please Don't Tell =

Cocktail bar in New York City

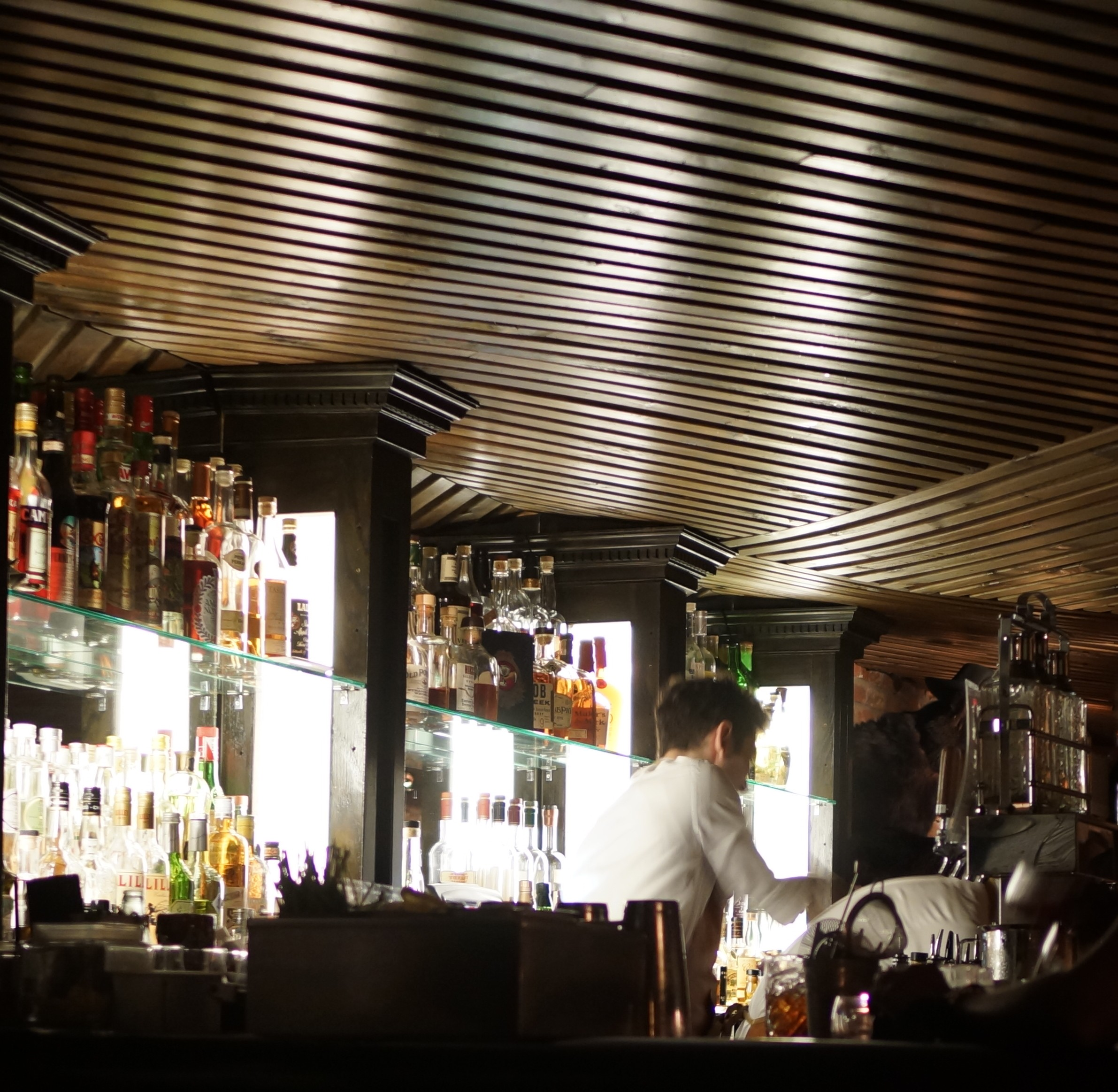
- Interactive map of Please Don't Tell

Restaurant information
- Established: May 24, 2007
- Owner: Jeff Bell
- Previous owner: Brian Shebairo
- Location: 113 St. Mark's Place, New York City
- Coordinates: 40.727112°N 73.983766°W
- Website: www.pdtnyc.com

PDT, also known as Please Don't Tell, is a speakeasy-style cocktail bar in the East Village of Manhattan, New York City. The bar is often cited as the first speakeasy-style bar and thus originator of the modern speakeasy trend, and has influenced the American bar industry in numerous ways, including beginning a sea change in New York City's cocktail culture. In 2010, GQ rated it one of the top ten bars in the United States.

== Attributes ==
The speakeasy bar is located in a hidden space alongside the hot dog shop Crif Dogs. Inside the shop is a wooden phone booth, which patrons use to be let into the bar; the back wall of the phone booth serves as the main door into PDT. The unmarked, complex way of entering that PDT employs is considered the ideal element of a speakeasy-style bar.

Inside, the bar has a small amount of space, for no more than four dozen people. The space has bar stools as well as a few booths and tables. The bar's menu includes craft cocktails and snacks, including gourmet hot dogs, tater tots, and french fries.

== History ==
The bar was founded by Jim Meehan, Brian Shebairo, and Chris Antista in 2007. The three began work in March; the bar opened three months later, on May 24, 2007. The bar's origin was partly due to the space – the next-door hot dog shop had a liquor license, and the bar owners found a legal way to make the liquor license extend into the bar, with the entrance from within the hot dog shop. There is a separate door to PDT, but if it was in use, the liquor license would not have been valid.

The bar became influential, including its co-founder Jim Meehan. Meehan was named best American bartender in 2009 at industry conference Tales of the Cocktail, and PDT earned the first-ever James Beard Award for outstanding bar program in 2012. Meehan went on to write the PDT Cocktail Book, containing some of the bar's recipes, along with the PDT Cocktails app. Both are frequently-used tools in many high-end bars.

In 2014, Jim Meehan, who was overseeing the bar's operations, moved to Portland, Oregon, to raise his family. Meehan's responsibilities then passed onto Jeff Bell.

Jeff Bell, a celebrated bartender, began his journey at Please Don’t Tell (PDT) as a barback in 2010 before rising to head bartender. During his tenure, PDT earned the James Beard Award for Outstanding Bar Program in 2012, solidifying its status as one of the world’s top cocktail destinations. Bell's talent and dedication earned him the title of Bartender of the Year in Diageo’s World Class competition in 2013, followed by the prestigious Best American Bartender award at Tales of the Cocktail in 2017. In 2020, he took the next step in his career by purchasing PDT and its iconic counterpart, Crif Dogs, from Brian Shebairo, ensuring the legacy of these beloved institutions while continuing to innovate in the craft cocktail industry.

A second location, PDT Hong Kong, is located in the landmark Mandarin Oriental hotel. The bar is also hidden behind a phone booth, and as of 2019 includes managing partners Jeff Bell, Brian Shebairo, and Jim Meehan.

== See also ==
- Craft cocktail movement
- The World's 50 Best Bars
