= Dale DeGroff =

American bartender and author (born 1948)

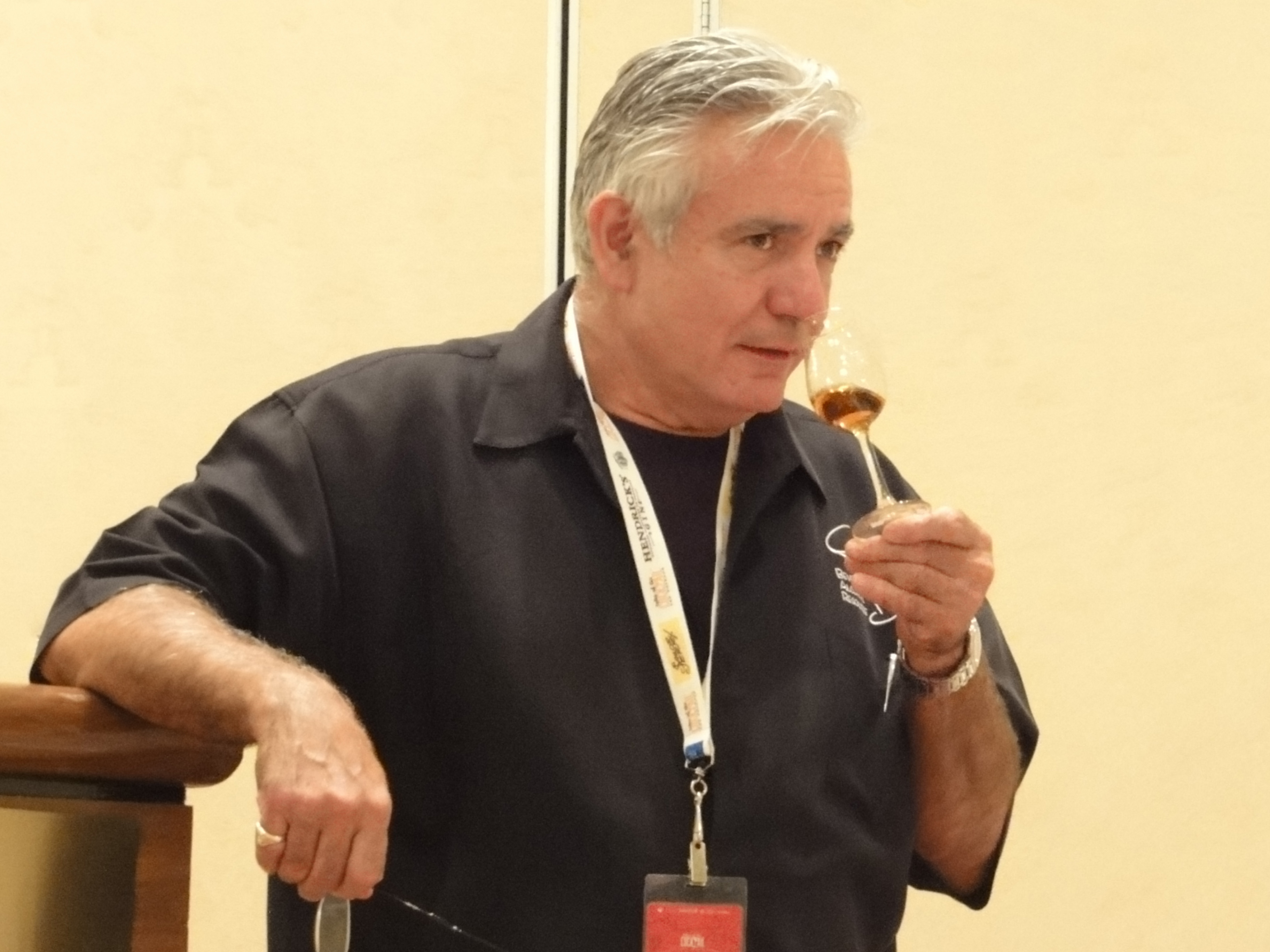
- DeGroff in 2010
- Born: September 21, 1948 (age 77); Rhode Island
- Occupation: Author
- Notable work: The Craft of the Cocktail

Dale DeGroff (born September 21, 1948), also known as "the King of Cocktails" or "King Cocktail", is an American bartender and author. The New York Times in 2015 called DeGroff "one of the world's foremost cocktail experts", and wrote that his book The Craft of the Cocktail is considered an essential bartending reference.

== Life and career ==
From 1987 to 1999 DeGroff rose to prominence as the original chief bartender in the Rainbow Room at Rockefeller Center in New York City, where his then-unusual emphasis on classic cocktail recipes and high-quality ingredients led to substantial acclaim and emulation by many other bars in New York City and beyond, and helped influence the creation of the craft cocktail movement.

He is the founding president of the Museum of the American Cocktail in New Orleans, founded in 2005. He is also a partner and consultant in the Beverage Alcohol Resource (BAR) group.

The James Beard Foundation awarded DeGroff the 2009 Wine & Spirits Professional Award, and in 2015 inducted him into the Who's Who in Food & Beverage in America. He received the 2009 Lifetime Achievement Award from Nightclub & Bar Magazine, the 2008 Tales of the Cocktail Lifetime Achievement Award, and along with his BAR partners, the 2007 Cheers Beverage Industry Innovator of the Year.

He is the author of two best-selling cocktail books: The Essential Cocktail, winner of the 2009 Tales of the Cocktail Spirit Award for Best New Cocktail/Bartending Book, and The Craft of the Cocktail, winner of the 2003 IACP Julia Child Award in the First Book category.

== Books ==
- 2002: The Craft of the Cocktail: Everything You Need to Know to Be a Master Bartender, with 500 Recipes. Clarkson Potter. ISBN 978-0609608753
- 2009: The Essential Cocktail (Random House)

== See also ==
- List of bartenders
