= Crème liqueur =

Liqueur with syrupy consistency

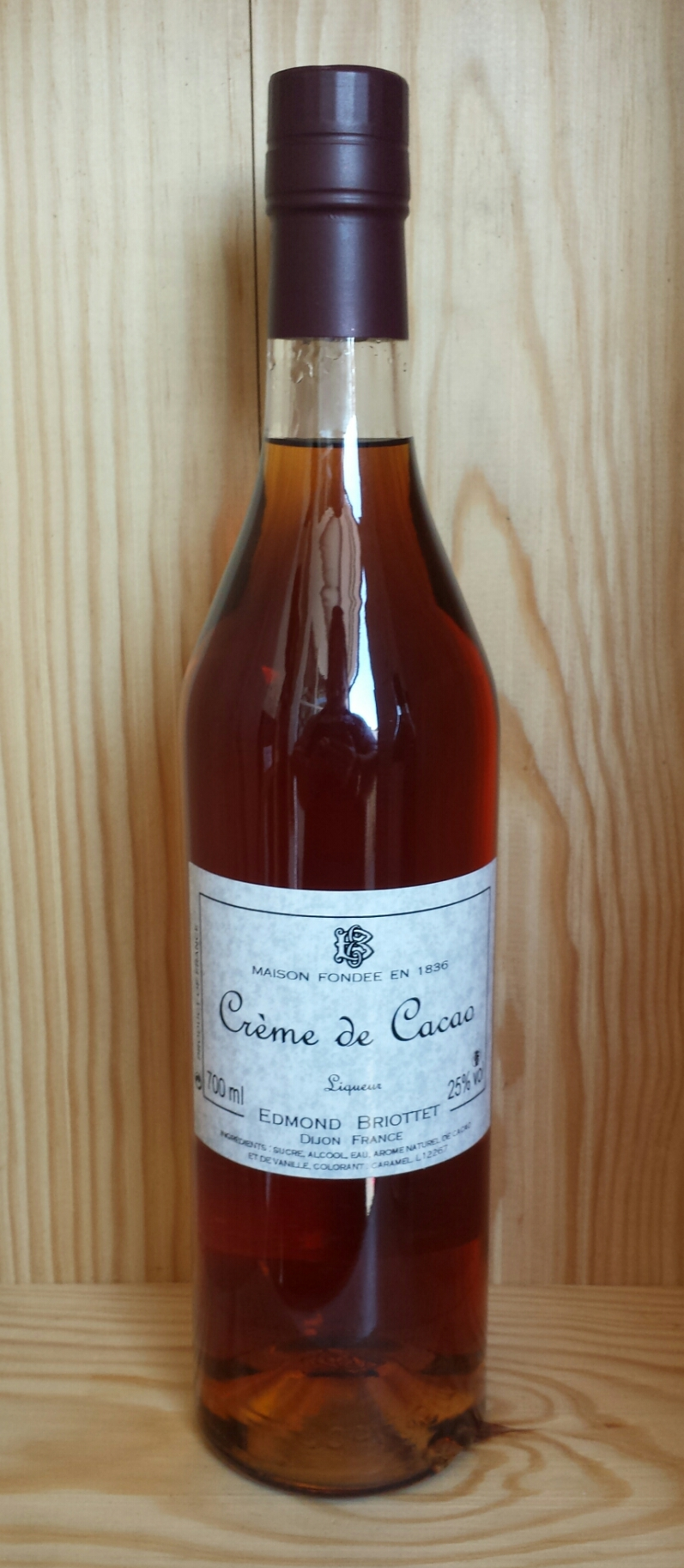
A bottle of crème de cacao

A crème liqueur is a liqueur that has a great deal of additional sugar added to the point that it has a near-syrup consistency. Unlike cream liqueurs, crème liqueurs include no cream in their ingredients. "Crème" in this case refers to the consistency. This category includes:

- Crème de banane – Banana
- Crème de cacao – Cocoa or chocolate
- Crème de cassis – Blackcurrant
- Crème de Cerise – Sour cherry
- Crème de menthe – Peppermint or Corsican mint
- Crème de mûre – Blackberry
- Crème de Noyaux – Almond, apricot kernel, or peach kernel
- Creme de violette – Violet
- Creme Yvette – Violet, fruit, and others
- Parfait d'Amour – Varies by maker, typically flowers with citrus

== See also ==
- List of crème liqueurs
