= Aviation (cocktail) =

Gin-based cocktail

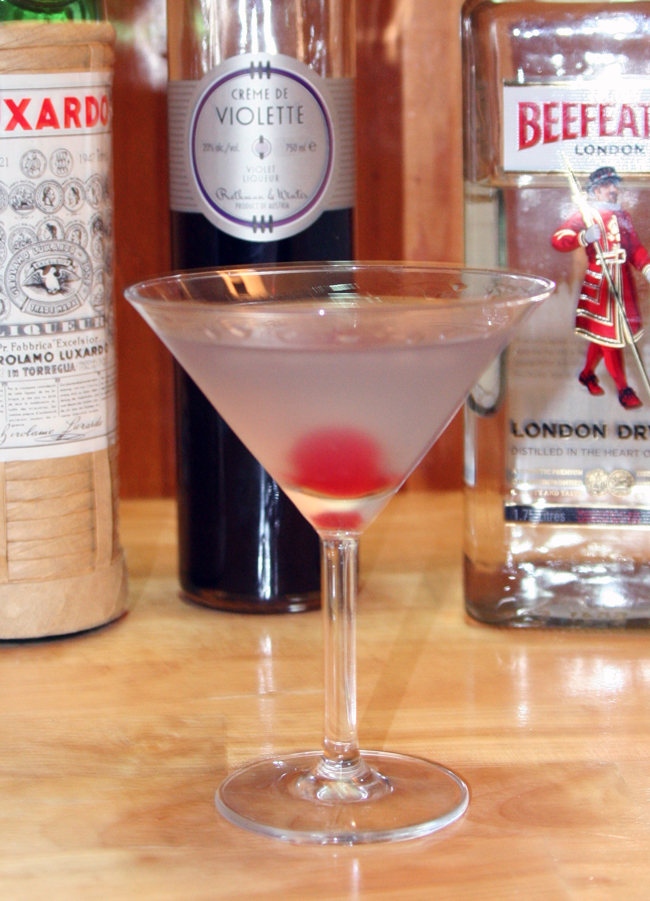
- Type: Cocktail
- Ingredients: 45 ml gin; 15 ml maraschino Luxardo; 15 ml lemon juice; 1 barspoon crème de violette
- Website: iba-world.com/iba-official-cocktails/aviation/
- Standard drinkware: Cocktail glass
- Standard garnish: maraschino cherry
- Served: Straight up: chilled, without ice
- Preparation: Add all ingredients into a cocktail shaker. Shake with cracked ice and strain into a chilled cocktail glass.
- Some recipes use Creme Yvette instead of crème de violette.

The aviation is a cocktail made with gin, maraschino liqueur, crème de violette and lemon juice. Some recipes omit the crème de violette. It is served straight up, in a cocktail glass.

== History ==
The aviation was created by Hugo Ensslin, head bartender at the Hotel Wallick in New York, in the early twentieth century. The first published recipe appeared in Ensslin's 1916 Recipes for Mixed Drinks. Ensslin's recipe called for two thirds El Bart gin, one third lemon juice, 2 dashes maraschino liqueur, and 2 dashes crème de violette.

Harry Craddock's influential Savoy Cocktail Book (1930) omitted the crème de violette, calling for a mixture of two thirds dry gin, one third lemon juice and two dashes of maraschino. Many later bartenders have followed Craddock's lead, leaving out the difficult-to-find violet liqueur.

Creme Yvette, a violet liqueur made with additional spices, is sometimes substituted for crème de violette.

== Related cocktails ==
- The aviation can be considered a variation on the Gin sour, using maraschino as its sweetener.
- The Water Lily substitutes an orange liqueur (such as triple sec or cointreau) for the maraschino.
- The Moonlight cocktail is made with gin, lime juice, Cointreau, and crème de violette.
- Takumi's aviation is made with gin, maraschino liqueur, parfait d'amour, and lemon juice. The drink was created by the Japanese bartender Takumi Watanabe. It was recorded in Gary Regan's The Joy of Mixology (2017).
- The Beachcomber is a version based on rum sour.

== See also ==
- List of cocktails
- List of IBA official cocktails
