= Lucas Bols =

Dutch alcohol company

Lucas Bols N.V.
- Type: Public
- Traded as: Euronext: BOLS
- Industry: Drinks
- Founded: 1575
- Headquarters: Amsterdam, the Netherlands
- Key people: Huub van Doorne, CEO
- Products: Alcoholic beverages
- Revenue: €80 million (2017)
- Net income: €15 million (2017)
- Owner: AAC Capital Benelux
- Number of employees: 68
- Website: www.lucasbols.com

Lucas Bols N.V. is a Dutch public company in the business of production, distribution, sales and marketing of alcoholic beverages. It claims to be the oldest distillery brand in the world. Its brand portfolio consists of Bols, Galliano, Vaccari, Tequila Partida, Pisang Ambon, Gold Strike and a large group of Dutch genevers and liqueurs. It produces about 3 million cases a year, with yearly revenues exceeding 95 million euros.

== History ==
=== Beginnings ===
In 1575 the Bols family opened their distillery t Lootsje (the little shed) in Amsterdam. The distillery was located outside the city walls on the post road to Haarlem, situated next to a stream. By 1612 the city's walls had expanded to encompass the distillery, and the stream was dug out into a canal called the Rozengracht because of rose nurseries in the area. Around the same time, a new stone building was constructed to house the distillery. The first official mention is in 1640 in Amsterdam town papers, where Pieter Jacobszoon Bols is documented as operator of t Lootsje on the Rozengracht.

The era of Lucas Bols (born 1652) corresponded with the Dutch Golden Age, when the Netherlands were a colonial power, and led the world in international commerce. The Dutch East India Company, of which Lucas was a major shareholder, brought exotic herbs, spices and fruits back to Amsterdam, and these were used to create new liqueurs and genevers.

During the 18th century, the Bols family became a very prosperous dynasty, but found itself becoming more and more detached from the day-to-day operation of the distillery. This lack of family leadership, along with the Continental Blockade of Napoleon, severely weakened the company, and when last male heir, Herman Bols, died in 1813, the company was offered for sale.

=== Van 't Wout era ===
Napoleon's defeat in 1815 sparked buying interest in the company, and Rotterdam financier Gabriël Theodorus van 't Wout acquired the firm with the condition that the company permanently retain the Bols name. New ownership revitalized the company. A price list from 1820 shows over 300 varieties of liqueurs, bitters, elixirs and gins; it is possible that some of these were never produced, and were merely disinformation aimed at competitors.

Van 't Wout succeeded in bringing the distillery back to profitability, but by 1822 a falling out with partner Coenraad Adriaan Temminck caused him to abandon his efforts with the company. In 1842 Van 't Wout wrote a manuscript entitled Distillateurs- en Liqueurbereiders Handboek door een oude patroon van 't Lootsje (English: Distillers and Liqueur makers Handbook by an old patron of "The Little Shed"), which is now in the Bols archives.

=== Moltzer family era ===
In 1868 the firm was again sold, this time to the Moltzer family who greatly expanded the company. In 1889, the Rozengracht canal was filled in order to provide a new major thoroughfare for Amsterdam. The old site was abandoned and a modern steam powered distillery was built in nearby Nieuw Vennep. Other distilleries were built in Scheveningen and in Emmerich, just over the Dutch border in Germany. In 1892, the company was reorganized into an LLC.

Former Dutch colonial possessions proved natural markets for the group's products, and a rapid international expansion followed. By the turn of the century, Bols was aggressively marketing its lines, and nearly all European dynasties had appointed them Royal Warrants. In 1873 Bols won a Fortschritts-Medaille at the Weltausstellung 1873 Wien and one year later became purveyor to the imperial court in Vienna. Other courts followed such as several kings and queens of the Netherlands, Belgium, Luxembourg, Greece, Sweden, Denmark, Monaco, and later in more modern times the courts of Ethiopia and Nepal.

After World War I, distilleries were started in France (1921), Poland (1922), Switzerland (1929), Canada (1932), South Africa (1933), Belgium (1934), Argentina (1935), Spain (1935) and the United States (1947). Bols also grew through takeover, including the firms of Hoppe and Wynand Fockink, its largest competitor since 1679. In 1954, the last of the Moltzer family left the board of directors, and Bols Distilleries became a publicly traded company.

=== Diversification ===
Bols continued to expand its reach over the next few decades until it participated in almost every geographic market in the world. Management was quick to realize, however, that societal trends away from alcohol consumption, particularly spirits, threatened the company. Genever was still a large component of Bol's revenues, and this was a particularly difficult market to grow outside of its native Netherlands, as global drinkers tended to prefer the British "dry" style of gin. A strategy of diversification through acquisition was adopted, and in 1977 Italian brands Cynar and Biancosarti, both aperitifs, were added, and in 1983 the company added its first non-alcoholic beverages with the acquisition of Terme di Crodo, makers of still and sparkling mineral waters, non-alcoholic bitters, and sodas, including Crodino, and various other fruit flavored beverages. (In a later divestiture, these brands became part of Campari Group). Through the 1980s, Bols continued to expand its range of non-alcoholic beverages with particular emphasis on the Italian and Swiss markets.

Already a leading producer of alcoholic beverages in its home country, Bols became the dominant producer of genever with its 1986 acquisition of Rotterdam based Henkes. In addition, this allowed Bols to vertically integrate itself, as Henkes had a network of retail liquor stores in the Netherlands. In 1988, Bols acquired Strothmann Brennereien GmbH & Co AG., instantly giving it the largest market share in the Korn Schnapps market, along with distribution channels and production facilities in Germany.

In 1989, Bols formed a joint venture with Gedistilleerd en Wijngroep Nederland (GWN), the wine and distilled beverages unit of Heineken, forming Bols Benelux B.V. The venture attained a near 50% market share in the Dutch liquor business, due in part to GWN's earlier acquisition of Bokma, another leading genever brand. The joint venture expanded into the rapidly growing wine segment, purchasing 85 percent of Consortium Vinicole de Bordeaux (CVBG), formerly part of Douwe Egberts. Other smaller French wine houses were quickly added to the portfolio. The company also boosted its operations in Italy in 1990, buying up Ottavio Riccadonna, adding that company's Spumante and Ricadonna brands.

=== Wessanen merger ===
By 1993, competition and consolidation in the industry had become cutthroat. Heineken decided to retrench to its beer business, and sold off its stake in the joint venture for 58.6 million guilders. Dutch foods giant Royal Wessanen and Bols saw a natural fit for horizontal integration, and a merger was completed into a new company: Bols Wessanen. From the beginning, integrating the two lines of business was difficult, and so led to profit pressures. The 1995 annual stockholders meeting was contentious and the company decided to focus its growth efforts toward the food sector. In 1997, the company moved to a new headquarters and production facility in Zoetermeer.

By 1999, it was obvious that the partnership wasn't working. The Bols side of the business was being neglected, and management wanted to unlock its potential for growth and profitability. CVC Capital Partners, a private equity firm, agreed, and a management buyout by the executive board (R.van Ogtrop, M. Emondts and T. Coenen ) was engineered forming Bols Royal Distilleries. Immediately thereafter, Bols acquired a number of brands from British drinks conglomerate Diageo.

=== Acquired by Rémy Cointreau ===
Almost immediately after the buyout, it became clear that Bols did not have the scale to effectively compete in the rapidly consolidating drinks industry. CVC Capital had an existing relationship with Rémy Cointreau, so it seemed natural to combine the two companies. In August 2000 an agreement was reached, and Remy paid CVC €510 million for Bols, which retained a 9% equity stake in the enlarged group. The merger was perceived as greatly helping both companies, allowing Remy to diversify into products requiring no expensive aging stock, an Eastern European distribution network, and access to Bol's management skills, while giving Bols access to Remy's joint venture worldwide distribution alliance, Maxxium.

The synergies of the combined company were immediately felt. Remy reported a string of strong earnings and profit growth, until a weakening dollar and a temporary drop in sales of Bols Vodka in Poland due to taxation and counterfeiting issues hurt 2003 results. Results in 2004 remained weak, but strong growth was noted of the vodka brand throughout Eastern Europe, and Maxxium committed considerable resources to modernizing the Bols image, including new packaging and refocusing on a youth driven market. Bols was awarded "Best Brand Re-Launch" by the trade publication Drinks International Magazine.

In 2005, Remy struck a complex deal with Central European Distribution Corporation (CEDC), wherein CEDC took ownership of the Bols production facilities in Poland and licensed various trademarks for use in Poland and Russia in exchange for a 9% equity stake. The deal gave each company access to the other's distribution networks. Remy also received a seat on CEDC's board of directors. CEDC would later buy Bol's Hungarian subsidiary and trademarks.

=== Management buyout ===
In 2005, Remy decided to focus on its premium brands, and on 8 December, it announced it would sell the Bols brand to concentrate on its core drinks. On 16 March 2006, Remy announced the sale of Bols to European investment fund ABN AMRO Capital (75%), together with a management group led by Mr. Huub van Doorne (25%). Mr. Van Doorne was a member of Rémy Cointreau's Management Board, and led the team that revitalized the Bols brand under Remy's ownership. Mezzanine capital was provided by GSC Group. The new company is named Lucas Bols, B.V. and is headquartered in Amsterdam. Its assets include the production facilities in the Netherlands, along with the brands, Bols, Galliano, Vaccari Sambuca, Pisang Ambon and Damrak Gin, plus leading Dutch Origin spirit brands such as Bokma and Hartevelt genevers and Coebergh. Distribution will still be mostly done by Maxxium, although the United States will be handled by new partner William Grant & Son, USA., a wholly owned subsidiary of William Grant & Sons.

== Marketing ==
Bols targets the "on-trade" market, i.e. bars and restaurants and positions itself as a leader to bar owners and their staff in support, innovation and new product development. The brand seeks to be a part of the mixology and cocktail culture. Bols sponsors trade associations, campaigns, and bartending academies and competitions.

The Bols museum in Amsterdam presents the history of the brand, its manufacturing methods and ingredients, and interactive exhibits. Visitors can practice flair bartending.

The Bols bartending academy offers accredited courses in bartending, flair bartending, mixology (the method behind bartending) and hospitality management.

== Products ==
Bols produces a number of different brands. It is common in the drinks industry for companies to buy and sell brands among themselves, as business decisions are made about what market space a particular company wants to occupy. With constant consolidation and divestiture in the industry, a company's brand portfolio is usually in a state of flux. Bols owns brands that it has historically produced, as well as ones acquired in various stages of its evolution, either directly or through joint ventures or other partnerships.

=== Liqueurs ===
==== Bols branded ====
Bols has long produced liqueurs it marketed under its own eponymous brand, going back in time to the very first products it made. Currently, it produces a line of 38 different flavors, sold in the new teardrop shaped bottle. These include:

- Advocaat, an egg based liqueur
- Amaretto, an almond flavored liqueur made from apricot pits
- Apricot brandy
- Bitter orange, a lighter orange colored liqueur made from Spanish oranges and bitter herbs
- Blueberry, liqueur
- Butterscotch schnapps
- Blue Curaçao, a deep blue, orange flavored liqueur made from a variety of orange types and herbs. This is Bols' signature product, and is commonly referred to as "Bols Blue."
- Cherry brandy. The cherry pit is also used, imparting a slight almond flavor.
- Coconut liqueur, with rum flavoring
- Coffee liqueur
- Crème de Banane, with vanilla, almond, herbs, and spices
- Crème de cacao brown
- Crème de cacao white
- Crème de Cassis, a blackcurrant flavored liqueur
- Dry Orange Curaçao, a dark orange colored liqueur made from orange peels and bitter herbs
- Grune Bananes liqueur
- Green Tea liqueur
- Kirsch liqueur, a clear Schwarzwalder cherry brandy with added sweetener
- Kiwi liqueur
- Lychee liqueur
- Maraschino, a clear Marasca cherry flavored liqueur Bols makes with Kirsch and a selection of herbs
- Mango liqueur
- Melon liqueur
- Parfait Amour, a purple colored Rose petal and orange liqueur, with a hint of vanilla. Another of Bols' centuries old recipes.
- Passion fruit liqueur
- Peach liqueur
- Peppermint Green and White. Bols' Crème de Menthe products.
- Pomegranate liqueur
- Prinzenkirsch, a sweeter, juicier Kirsch
- Raspberry (Framboise) liqueur
- Red Orange liqueur. A bright red, sweet blend of citrus and tropical fruit such as passion fruit and peach.
- Sloe Gin liqueur
- Strawberry (fraise) liqueur
- Triple sec Curaçao, a clear, orange liqueur
- Triple Sec & Lime liqueur. A fusion of lime extract and Triple Sec.
- Vanilla liqueur
- Watermelon liqueur

Also documented elsewhere, but not officially mentioned by Bols are blackberry liqueur and sour apple liqueur. Note: Although fruit brandies are not strictly liqueurs, Bols classifies theirs as such, perhaps due to added sweeteners.

==== Pisang Ambon ====
Pisang Ambon is a banana and tropical fruit flavored liqueur.

==== Galliano ====
Galliano is a complex anise, vanilla and herbal liqueur first produced by Vaccari. It is also confusingly the brand name for a line of other liqueurs from Vaccari, most or all of which are no longer produced. The line included an amaretto, a black sambuca, a white sambuca, and a white peach liqueur.

==== Vaccari Sambuca ====
Sambuca is a traditional Italian liqueur flavored with star anise.

==== Bootz ====
Bootz is a Dutch-only brand which includes a wide range of liqueurs and spirits. One of these is the no longer existing liqueur Tip van Bootz.

==== Coebergh ====
Coebergh is a Dutch only brand which is the number one liqueur and the biggest drinks brand marketed to women in the Netherlands. It is produced in four styles: Coebergh Classic has a blackcurrant/blackberry flavor, Coebergh Red has a cranberry flavor, Coebergh Cherry and Coebergh raspberry. In the Netherlands it is informally referred to as 'bessen',(literally meaning berries), often in a mix with Sprite or 7-up.

==== Evita ====
A Dutch-only coffee flavored liqueur.

==== Goldstrike ====
A Dutch-only cinnamon schnapps, similar to Goldschläger. A less alcoholic version with silver flakes called Silverstrike also exists.

==== Kontiki ====
Kontiki is a gin-based liqueur flavored with lemon and grapefruit.

==== Zwarte Kip ====
Zwarte Kip is an advocaat, a thick and creamy eggnog flavored liqueur.

=== Liquors ===
==== Bols branded ====
Bols has a line of internationally shipped vodka, flavored vodkas, gin, and genever. As noted above, in Eastern Europe, the Bols brand is produced and marketed by another entity, CEDC.

==== Damrak Gin ====
Damrak is a luxury, international-style gin. It has been well reviewed in independent drinks competitions. Damrak was Amsterdam's first harbor, and the name pays tribute to the original genever trade.

==== Bokma ====
Bokma is a Dutch-only brand of genevers, Lemon Genever, and Lemon Brandy.

==== Claeryn ====
Claeryn is a Dutch-only brand of jonge genever. Claeryn was also involved in an important legal case involving trademarks. The Benelux Court of Justice held that a similarly named liquid detergent infringed due to the concept of detriment of repute.

==== Els La Vera ====
Els La Vera is a traditional bitters from the Limburg region, popular in the south of the Netherlands.

==== Hartevelt ====
Hartevelt is another complete line of genevers and lemon brandy.

==== Hoppe ====
Yet another jonge genever.

==== Parade ====
An old Dutch value brand used in off-trade (home) mixing.

== Statistics ==
In 2016 to 2019, there was a 5.6% loss in Lucas Bols, leading to less profitability of shareholders.

== See also ==
- List of oldest companies
