= Takumi Watanabe (bartender) =

Japanese bartender, known for his cocktail of Takumi's Aviation

Takumi Watanabe (渡邉匠)
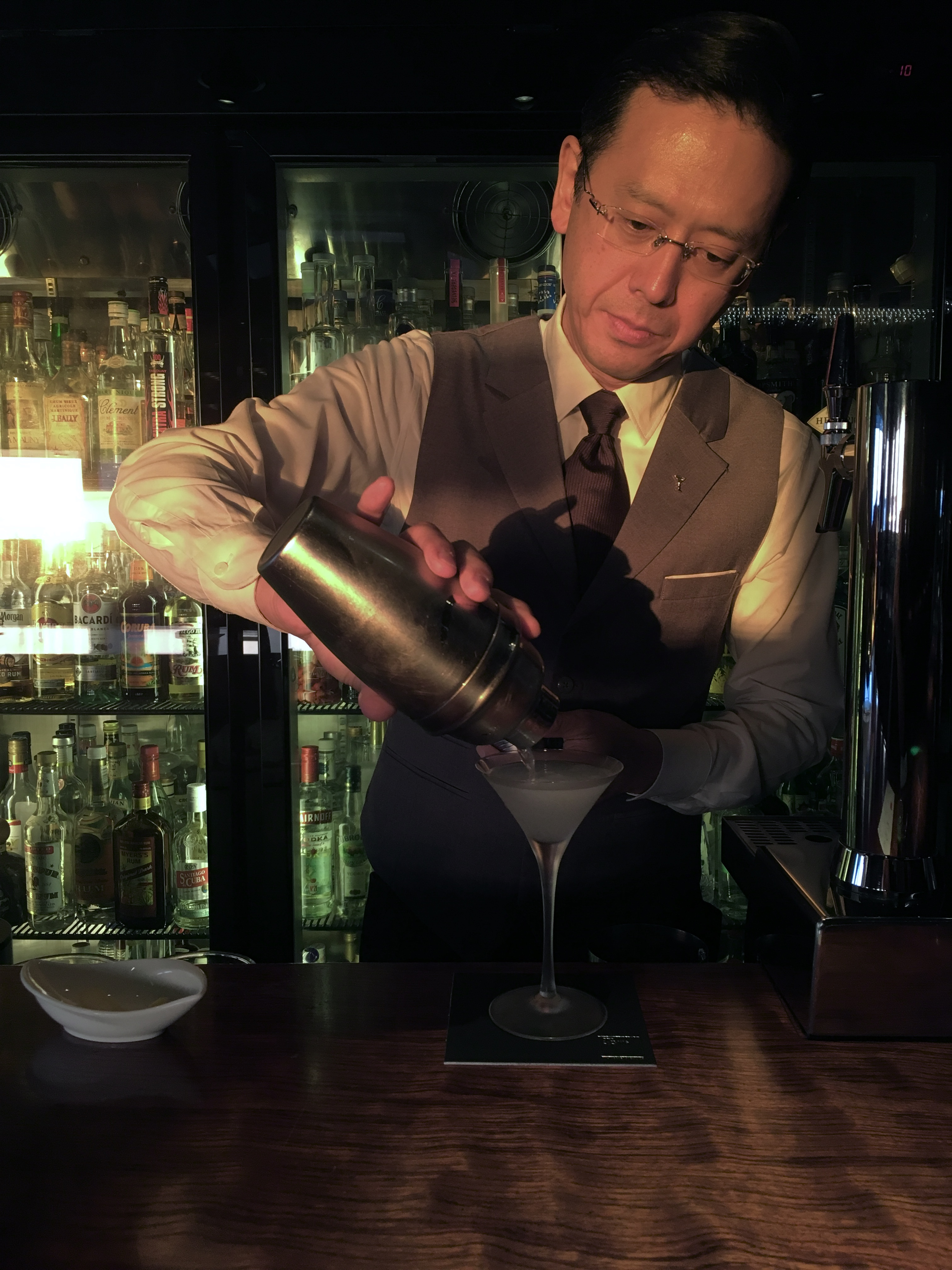
- Born: May 15, 1972 (age 54); Gifu, Gifu Prefecture, Japan
- Occupation: Bartender

Takumi Watanabe (渡邉匠, Takumi Watanabe; May 15, 1972) is a Japanese bartender. He has worked in the Sailing Bar in Sakurai Nara since 1994. He is known for the cocktail Takumi's Aviation.

== Life ==
Watanabe was born in Gifu on May 25, 1972. After graduating from high school, he moved to Nara and majored in law. He worked for tuition in a bar and restaurant. At the time, he started to learn bartending. He has worked in The Sailing Bar since the bar opened in Sakurai since 1994. He was a brand ambassador for Taketsuru Japanese Pure Malt Whisky.

== Takumi's Aviation ==
He created a version of the Aviation in Diageo World Class bartenders competition in Athens, Greece in 2010. Gary "Gaz" Regan, cocktail historian, named the drink Takumi's Aviation. In 2017, Regan contacted Takumi to ask about the recipe, and Takumi said that it substituted the crème de violette usually included in an aviation cocktail with Parfait d'Amour. The Parfait d'Amour has more orange and vanilla notes than crème de violette, which is usually quite floral. The drink was recorded in his book The Joy of Mixology.

== Cocktails ==
- Takumi's Aviation is an Aviation variant, recorded in Gary Regan's The Joy of Mixology.
- Red Thorn is a riff of Blackthorn, recorded in Jared Brown & Anistatia Miller's The Deans of Drink and Gary Regan's 101 Best New Cocktails, Volume III.
- Cove was recorded in Gary Regan's 101 Best New Cocktails Volume IV, made with Taketsuru Whisky. At the time, Watanabe was the brand ambassador.
