= Takumi's aviation =

Gin-based cocktail

- Type: Cocktail
- Ingredients: 1 1/2 ounces gin; 1/2 ounce Maraschino liqueur; 1/8 ounce Parfait d'amour liqueur; 1/3 ounce lemon juice
- Base spirit: Gin
- Standard drinkware: Cocktail glass
- Standard garnish: Lemon peel twist
- Served: Straight up: chilled, without ice
- Preparation: Add all ingredients into cocktail shaker filled with ice. Shake well and strain into cocktail glass. Garnish with a lemon peel.

Takumi's aviation is a modern classic cocktail made with gin, maraschino liqueur, parfait d'amour, and lemon juice. It is served straight up, in a cocktail glass. It is based on the Aviation cocktail.

== History ==
Takumi's aviation was created by Takumi Watanabe, head bartender at The Sailing Bar in Sakurai, Nara, Japan. In 2010, he created the drink for the Diageo World Class Bartender Competition in Athens, Greece. Bartender and writer Gary Regan, who was judging the competition, described it as "the very best Aviation cocktail I've ever encountered". In 2017, Regan contacted Takumi to ask about the recipe, and Takumi said that it substituted the crème de violette usually included in an aviation cocktail with parfait d'amour. The parfait d'amour has more orange and vanilla notes than crème de violette, which is usually quite floral. A recipe for the drink appeared in Regan's 2017 book The Joy of Mixology.

== Preparation ==
Regan's recreation of the original recipe called for 44 mL (1.5 U.S. fl oz) gin, 15 mL (.5 U.S. fl oz) maraschino liqueur, 3.7 mL (1/8 U.S. fl oz) parfait d'amour liqueur, and 10 mL (1/3 U.S. fl oz) lemon juice. It is garnished with a twist of lemon peel on the top.

In 2021, Watanabe said that he had changed the cocktail recipe to adjust for changing liquor formulations, stating "Because the liqueurs have changed its flavor, I adjusted the recipe." The new recipe for the drink appeared in The Japanese Cocktail : Watanabe Takumi and Kaneko Michito's philosophy. It called for 45 mL (1.5 U.S. fl oz) gin, 30 mL (1.0 U.S. fl oz) maraschino liqueur, 5 mL (0.17 U.S. fl oz) parfait d'amour liqueur, and 20 mL (0.68 U.S. fl oz) lemon juice. A twist of lemon peel is used for garnish.

== See also ==
- List of cocktails
