= Water Lily (cocktail) =

Cocktail made with gin and orange liquor

Water lily
- Type: Mixed drink
- Ingredients: 3/4 Triple Sec; 3/4 crème de violette; 3/4 lemon juice; 3/4 gin
- Base spirit: Gin
- Standard drinkware: Champagne coupe
- Standard garnish: Orange peel
- Preparation: Combine ingredients with ice in cocktail shaker; shake well, then strain into cocktail glass, pouring over ice.

The Water Lily is a cocktail made with gin, crème de violette, orange liqueur such as triple sec or cointreau, and fresh lemon juice. It can be garnished with orange zest and served in a coupe glass.

The variation White Lily is made with gin, rum and Cointreau, and the anise-flavored French liquor pastis, omitting the violet liquor.

The Moonlight cocktail is identical to the Water Lily, except with lime juice in place of the lemon juice.

== See also ==
- Aviation
- Arsenic and Old Lace
