= Maraska =

Croatian company that produces distilled beverages

- Traded as: MRSK
- Industry: Alcohol
- Founded: 1945; 81 years ago
- Headquarters: Zadar, Croatia
- Area served: Worldwide
- Products: Alcoholic beverages
- Number of employees: 150
- Website: maraska.hr

Maraska is a Croatian company best known for its maraschino, a liqueur obtained from the distillation of Marasca cherries.

== History ==
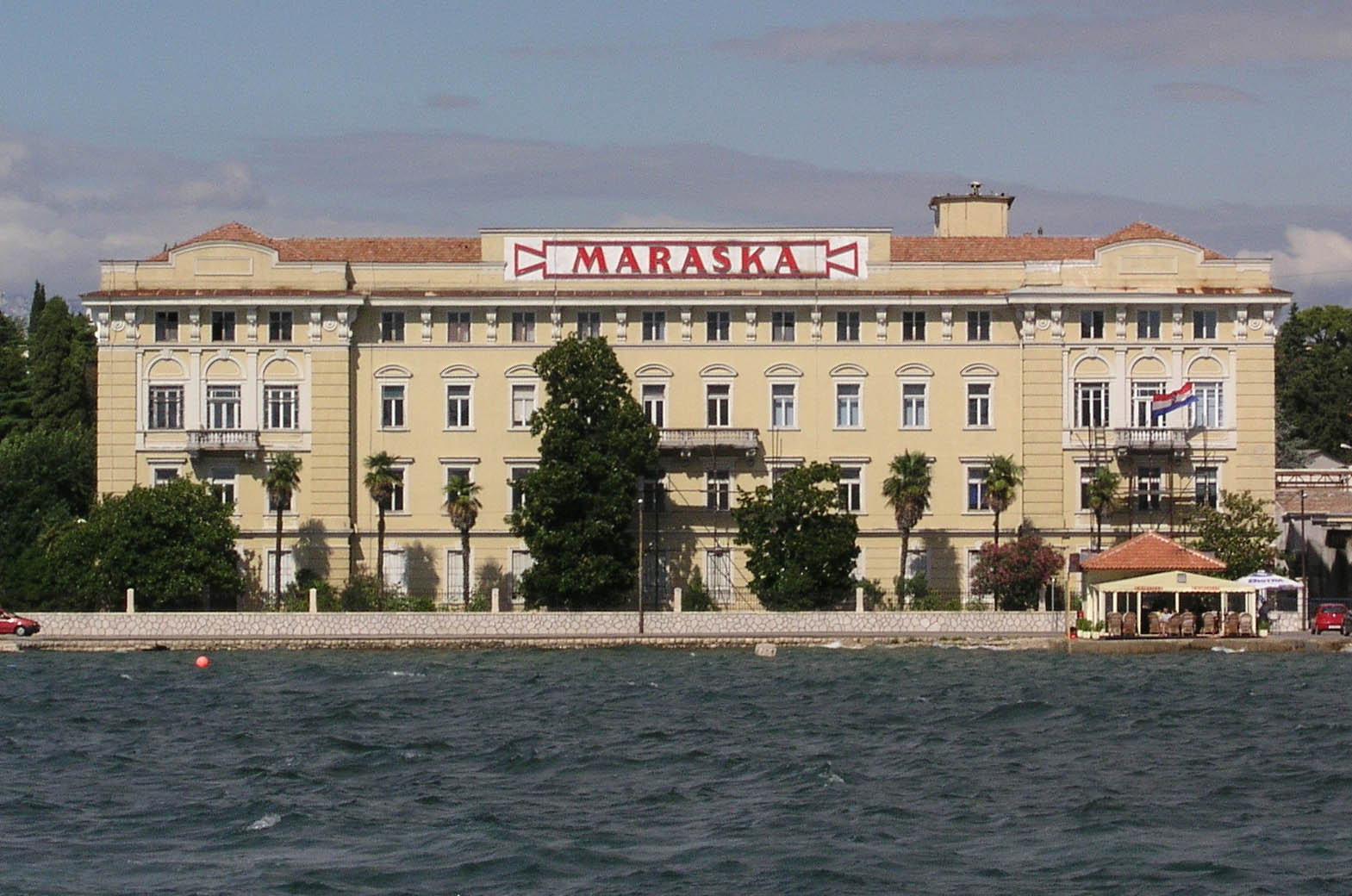
Maraska factory in Zadar

In 1759, Francesco Drioli, a Venetian merchant, began industrial-scale production of maraschino in Zadar, Croatia, which was then part of the Republic of Venice. As the reputation of Maraschino grew, so did that of Zadar, which prompted other factories to emerge and become established, particularly those of Girolamo Luxardo (1821) and Romano Vlahov (1861). Together they formed l' industria del maraschino di Zara (the maraschino industry of Zadar).

After the Second World War the historic factories, including all usable equipment, were nationalized and unified into a single enterprise which eventually gave rise to a new factory called Maraska, located in the former Luxardo premises.

In 2022 the company was acquired by Stanić Group.
