= Amaretto =

Italian almond liqueur

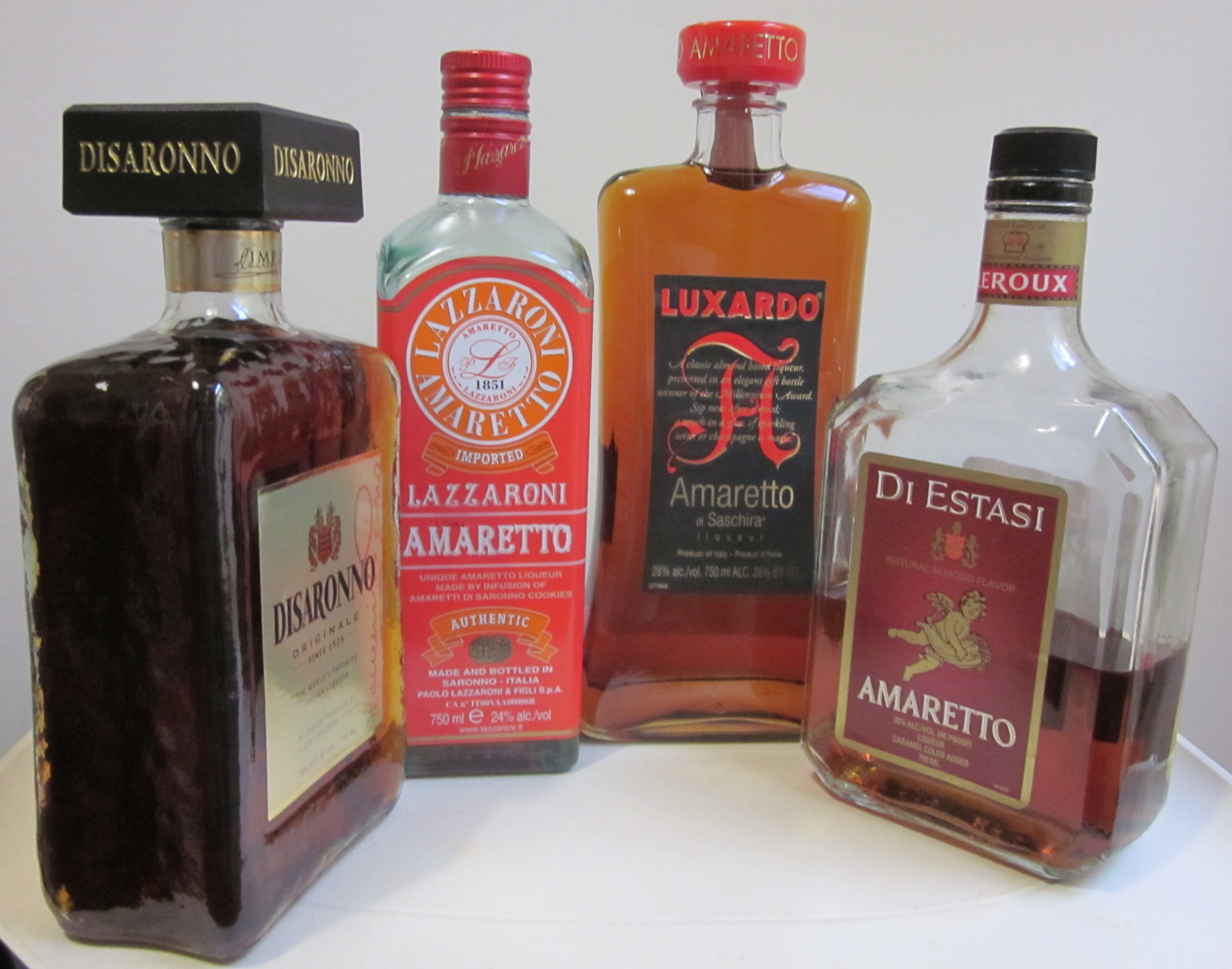
Bottles of amaretto liqueur

Amaretto (Italian for 'a little bitter') is a sweet Italian liqueur originating from the comune (municipality) of Saronno. Depending on the brand, it may be made from apricot kernels, bitter almonds, peach stones, or almonds, all of which are natural sources of the benzaldehyde that provides the almond-like flavour of the liqueur. It generally contains 21 to 28 percent alcohol by volume.

When served as a beverage, amaretto can be drunk by itself, used as an ingredient to create several popular mixed drinks, or added to coffee. Amaretto is also commonly used in Italian and other cuisines, especially in recipes for confectionery and sweet baked goods.

== Origin ==
=== Etymology ===
The name amaretto originated as a diminutive of the Italian word amaro, meaning "bitter", which references the distinctive flavour lent by the mandorla amara or by the drupe kernel. The bitterness of amaretto tends to be mild, however, and sweeteners (and sometimes sweet almonds) enhance the flavour in the final products.

Amaretto is distinct from amaro, a type of bitter Italian liqueur made from herbs, roots, flowers, bark, and/or citrus peels.

=== Legend ===
Despite the history of introducing and accepting almonds into Italian cuisine, newer takes on the meanings and origins have been popularized by two major brands. Though of sometimes questionable provenance, these tales hold a sentimental place in Saronno culture:

In 1525, a Saronno church commissioned artist Bernardino Luini, one of Leonardo da Vinci's pupils, to paint its sanctuary with frescoes. As the church was dedicated to the Virgin Mary, Luini needed to depict the Madonna but needed a model. He found his inspiration in a young widowed innkeeper, who became his model and (in most versions) lover. The woman wished to give him a gift out of gratitude and affection. Her simple means did not permit much, so she steeped apricot kernels in brandy and presented the resulting concoction to a touched Luini.

== Notable brands ==
- DeKuyper – Netherlands
- Disaronno – Italy
- Lazzaroni – Italy
- Bols – Netherlands
- Luxardo – Italy

== Usage ==
Amaretto serves a variety of culinary uses.

=== Cooking ===
- Amaretto is frequently added to desserts including ice cream, cookies, and cakes. It can also be used in glazes for savoury dishes.

=== Cocktails ===
Cocktails with Amaretto liqueur as a primary ingredient:

- Amaretto piña colada – amaretto liqueur, light rum, coconut milk, and pineapple juice
- Amaretto sour – amaretto liqueur, lemon juice, egg white, sugar or simple syrup and orange slice and cherries, for garnish
- French Connection – amaretto liqueur and Cognac (IBA official cocktail)
- Godfather – amaretto liqueur and Scotch
- IBA Tiki – a blend of rums, amaretto liqueur, Frangelico, maraschino, passion fruit purée, pineapple juice, and lime juice (IBA official cocktail)
- Nutcracker Martini – amaretto liqueur, dark crème de cacao, vodka, and Irish cream
- Snickerdoodle Cookie Martini – amaretto liqueur, cinnamon liqueur, and cinnamon vodka
- Toasted Almond – amaretto liqueur, coffee liqueur, and milk or cream. Some versions add vodka

=== Orgeat syrup ===
Amaretto is sometimes used as a substitute for Orgeat syrup in places where the syrup cannot be found or to impart a less sweet flavour.

== See also ==
- Bitter almond liqueur – a similar drink from Portugal
- List of almond dishes
- List of cocktails
