= Arsenic and Old Lace (cocktail) =

Classic cocktail from the 1940s

- Type: Mixed drink
- Ingredients: 2 gin; 1 vermouth; 1/12 absinthe; 1/2 créme de violette; 1/3 chilled water
- Standard drinkware: Champagne coupe
- Standard garnish: Lemon peel
- Preparation: Stir in a chilled glass. Can be shaken. Dilute as needed.

Arsenic and Old Lace (also called the Attention Cocktail or the Atty) is a classic cocktail with its origins in the 1910s made with gin, crème de violette, dry vermouth and absinthe.

The first appearance of a cocktail with these four parts, albeit in equal quantities, was in Hugo Ensslin's Recipes for Mixed Drinks published in 1917, called the "Attention Cocktail".

The 1930 edition of The Savoy Cocktail Book, a drink with those four ingredients, rebranded as the "Atty Cocktail" had ratios that more closely matched the modern Arsenic and Old Lace.

"The Atty" first appears under the name "Arsenic and Old Lace" in 1941, published in the Cocktail Guide and Ladies' Companion by former Broadway producer Crosby Gaige. Around the same time, Joseph Kesselring's play Arsenic and Old Lace opened on Broadway in January 1941. The timing strongly implies a connection, though it is speculative to say whether Gaige was the one who renamed the cocktail.

== Variations ==
A similar drink with orange juice in place of absinthe is called the "Jupiter cocktail".

== See also ==
- White Cargo
- Aviation
