= IBA Tiki =

Cocktail with rum, amaretto, and Frangelico

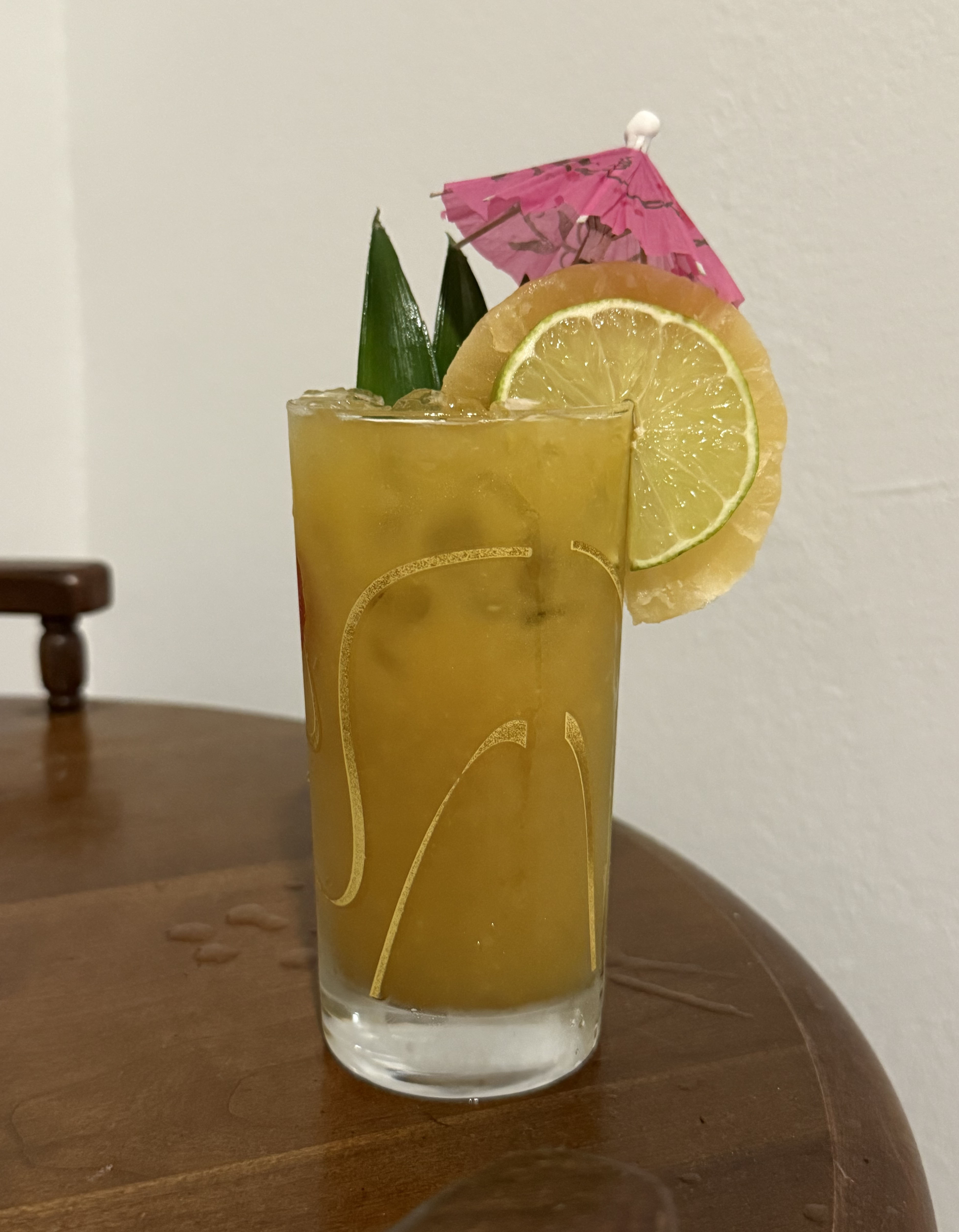
- Type: Cocktail
- Ingredients: 30 mL Havana Club Profundo rum; 30 mL Havana Club Smoky rum; 15 mL amaretto; 5 mL Frangelico; 5 drops Luxardo maraschino; 30 mL passion fruit purée; 90 mL pineapple juice; 30 mL lime juice; 1 slice of ginger
- Base spirit: Rum
- Website: iba-world.com/iba-cocktail/iba-tiki/
- Standard drinkware: Highball glass
- Standard garnish: Citruses, dehydrated pineapple slice
- Served: On the rocks: poured over ice
- Preparation: Muddle the slice of ginger in a cocktail shaker. Pour remaining ingredients into the shaker, and shake with ice. Strain into a tiki glass over pebbled ice.

The IBA Tiki is a tiki cocktail made with a blend of rums, amaretto, Frangelico, maraschino, passion fruit purée, pineapple juice, lime juice, and muddled ginger. Invented by Cuban bartender Diosmel Mendoza Medrano in 2022, it has been recognized by its namesake International Bartenders Association (IBA) as an official cocktail since 2024.

== History ==
The IBA Tiki was invented by Cuban bartender Diosmel Mendoza Medrano in honor of the International Bartenders Association's 69th annual World Cocktail Championship, held in the Cuban resort town of Varadero in November 2022, the first instance after a hiatus due to the COVID-19 pandemic. Medrano created the cocktail at El Polinesio, a tiki bar at the Habana Libre hotel in Havana that was formerly operated by Trader Vic's.

The recipe was created at the request of the competition's organizers, in honor of the IBA's board. It specifically calls for Havana Club brand rums and Girolamo Luxardo brand maraschino, both of which were sponsors for the competition.

The cocktail was added to the list of IBA official cocktails in March 2024, when it was included as the 101st cocktail in the organization's 101 IBA Cocktails book.

== See also ==
- List of cocktails
