= Mary Pickford (cocktail) =

Sweet rum cocktail

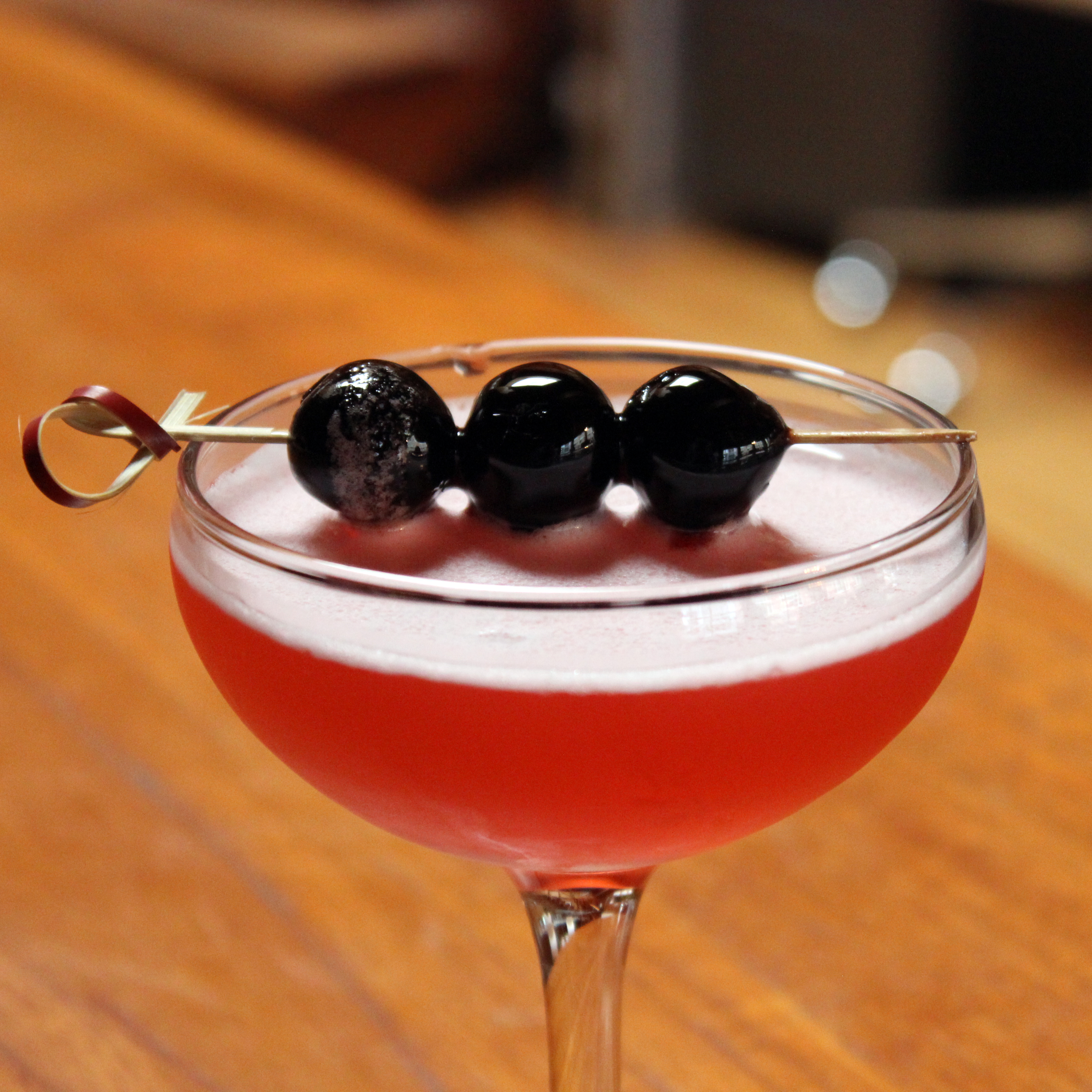
- Type: Cocktail
- Ingredients: 4.5 cl white rum; 4.5 cl fresh pineapple juice; 0.5 cl grenadine; 0.75 cl maraschino
- Base spirit: Rum
- Website: iba-world.com/iba-cocktails/
- Standard drinkware: Cocktail glass
- Served: Straight up: chilled, without ice
- Preparation: Shake and strain into a chilled large cocktail glass

A Mary Pickford is a Prohibition era cocktail made with white rum, fresh pineapple juice, grenadine, and maraschino liqueur. It is served shaken and chilled, often with a maraschino cherry.

== History ==
Named for Canadian-American film actress Mary Pickford (1892–1979), it is said to have been created for her in the 1920s by either Eddie Woelke or Fred Kaufmann at the Hotel Nacional de Cuba on a trip she took to Havana with husband Douglas Fairbanks and Charlie Chaplin. Research into travel schedules, however, have shown no such trip ever occurred.

The first published rum-based Mary Pickford cocktail recipe was in 1927's El Arte de Hacer un Cocktail y Algo Más which was a promotional giveaway for Compañía Cervecera Internacional S.A. It resembles the modern recipe, although it adds egg white. While 1924's Manual del Cantinero has a Mari [sic] Pickford recipe, it is gin-based. 1928's When It’s Cocktail Time in Cuba by Basil Woon is generally considered to be the first publication of the standard recipe.

== See also ==
- Bloody Mary (cocktail)
- Queen Mary (cocktail)
