= Kaneko Michito =

Japanese bartender

Michito Kaneko
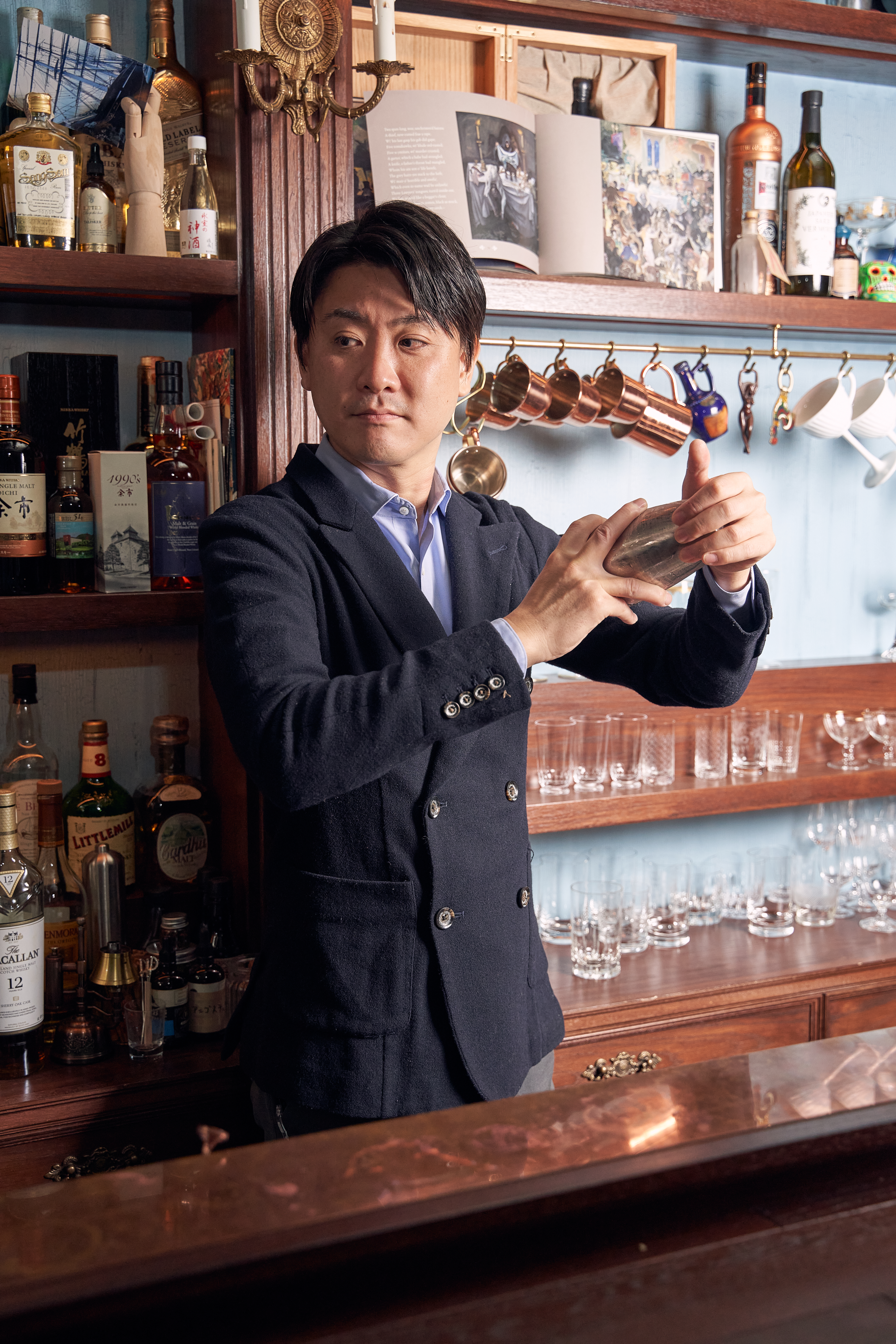

Personal details
- Born: August 24, 1981 (age 45) Japan Kansai Nara

Kaneko Michito (金子 道人, Kaneko Michito; born August 22, 1981) is a bartender from Japan. He won the title, "Bartender of the Year", in Diageo World Class bartender competition in 2015.

== Life ==
Kaneko was born in an artists' family in a countryside in Nara on August 24, 1981. He majored in food and beverage department. Before starting to be a bartender, he worked as a cook and a construction worker. His first job as a bartender was in Bar Tender in Wakayama. And then worked in the hotel bar, Bar Old Time, in Fujita Hotel in Nara. His own bar, Lamp Bar, was opened in Nara since December 2011.。

He attended Diageo World Class Japan bartender competition in 2014, and placed in the top 10. In 2015, he won the champion of Japan in June, and won the global champion from more than 50,000 bartenders in August. The competition location was in Cape Town, South Africa, Africa.

Kaneko regards Takumi Watanabe as his mentor. There is a book about Kaneko and Takumi's cocktails, named "The Japanese Cocktail" in Chinese.
