= White Cargo (disambiguation) =

White Cargo is a 1942 film.

White Cargo may also refer to:

- White Cargo (1930 film), a British drama film
- White Cargo (1937 film), a French drama film
- White Cargo (1958 film), a French crime drama film
- White Cargo (1973 film), a British comedy film
- White Cargo (cocktail), a boozy milkshake made with gin
