= Girolamo Luxardo (entrepreneur) =

Italian entrepreneur and diplomat

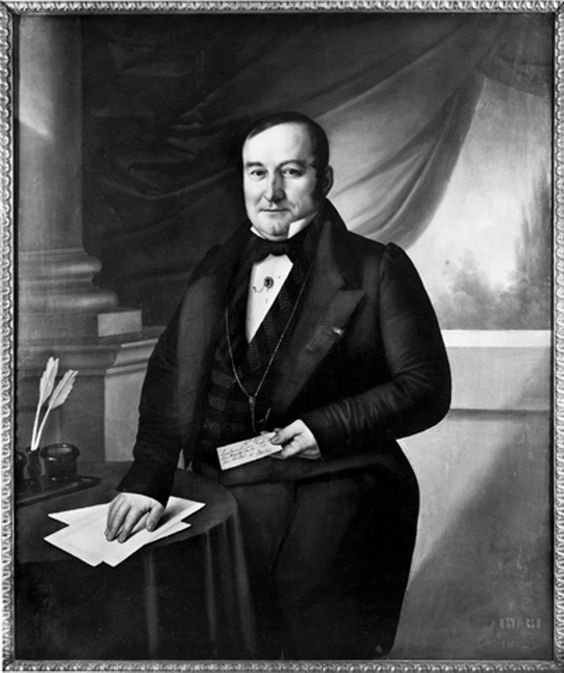
- Portrait of Girolamo Luxardo
- Born: Carlo Maria Viola; 1784; Santa Margherita Ligure, Kingdom of Sardinia
- Died: 1865 (aged 80–81); Zara, Kingdom of Dalmatia, Austrian Empire (Today Zadar, Croatia)
- Occupation(s): Entrepreneurship, Industrialism
- Spouse: Maria Canevari

Girolamo Luxardo (1784–1865) was an Italian entrepreneur and diplomat, founder of the Italian liqueur brand Girolamo Luxardo.

== Early life ==
He was born in Santa Margherita Ligure in Liguria, in the Kingdom of Sardinia, in 1784. Luxardo was the descendant of a noble Ligurian family.

== Career ==
In 1817 he moved to Zara (today Zadar, Croatia). His wife Maria Canevari produced liqueurs at home, specializing in "rosolio maraschino", a liquor from Dalmatia. In 1821, he opened a distillery, receiving the privilege to produce maraschino from the Court of Vienna. Thus he transformed the maraschino from home-made product into an industrial product that soon gained international fame.

The presidency of Zadar's chamber of commerce, which was re-organized by Luxardo, was held by members of his family until 1943. The members of the Luxardo family consolidated the trade relationships between Italy and Dalmatia.

His distillery became the most important of Austria-Hungary and, after the World War I and the annexation of Zadar to Italy, one of the most important of the Kingdom of Italy. The factory was destroyed in the 1943 bombings, and in the aftermath of World War II moved to Padua by his descendants.

== Death ==
Luxardo died in 1865 in Zara (Zadar).

== See also ==
- Girolamo Luxardo S.p.A.
