= Casino (cocktail) =

Cocktail

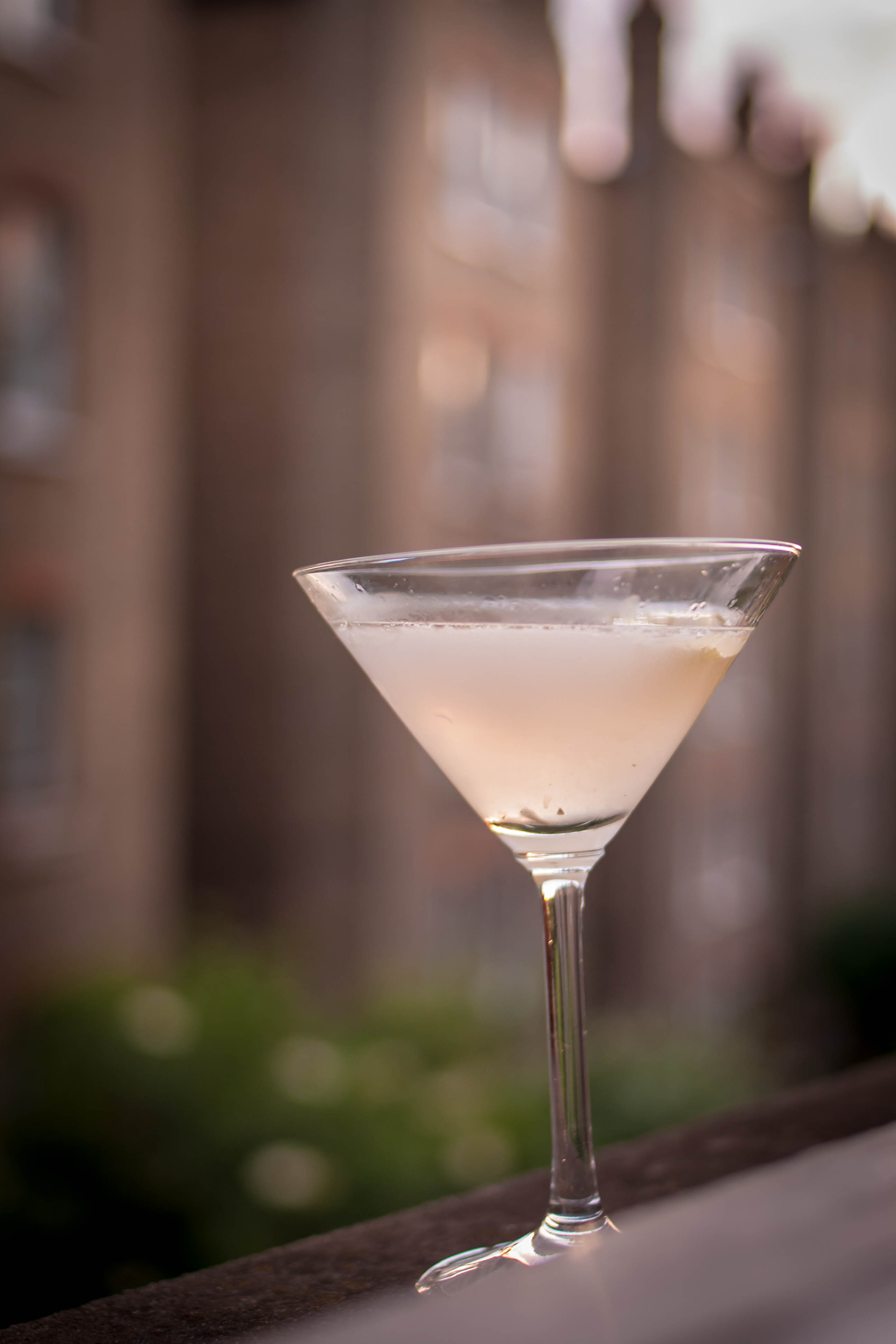
- Casino
- Type: Cocktail
- Ingredients: 4 cl gin (Old Tom); 1 cl Maraschino; 1 cl fresh lemon juice; 2 dashes orange bitters
- Standard drinkware: Cocktail glass
- Standard garnish: Lemon twist and maraschino cherry
- Served: Straight up: chilled, without ice
- Preparation: Pour all ingredients into shaker with ice cubes. Shake well. Strain into chilled cocktail glass. Garnish with a lemon twist and a maraschino cherry. Serve without a straw.

The Casino is an IBA official cocktail made with gin, maraschino liqueur, orange bitters and fresh lemon juice.

This version of the Casino Cocktail first appears in 1909, in novel The Reminder (3rd edition) by Jacob A. Didier.

== See also ==
- List of cocktails
