= Blackthorn (cocktail) =

Cocktail

- Ingredients: 2 oz sloe gin; 1 oz dry vermouth; dash Angostura bitters; dash Absinthe; or: 2 oz Irish whiskey; 1 oz. sweet vermouth; dash Angostura bitters; dash Absinthe
- Standard drinkware: Cocktail glass
- Standard garnish: lemon slice
- Served: chilled
- Preparation: Fill mixing glass with gin, vermouth, and bitters. Add ice and stir until chilled, then add strain into a chilled glass. Garnish with a lemon peel.

The Blackthorn is an Irish whiskey or sloe gin based cocktail. Both versions emerged in the late 19th and early 20th century.

While these two version are the dominant ones today, there were several variations that early 20th century bartenders would have been aware of. Bill Boothby's World Drinks and How to Mix Them (1934) includes five different "Blackthorn" cocktails.

== The gin version ==
The blackthorn is another name for Prunus spinosa, the plant whose fruit is called "sloes." Those sloes are infused in gin to create sloe gin, which gives the gin version of the cocktail its name. The name Blackthorn/Blackthorne was assigned to several cocktails, nearly all of which used sloe gin as its base.

The "Blackthorne Sour" was among the earliest and most widespread. In The 20th Century Guide for Mixing Fancy Drinks by James C. Maloney (1900) included a drink with sloe gin, apricot brandy, citrus juice and pineapple syrup. Variations were abound. Joe Fitchett's 1925 recipe omits pineapple syrup.

Among the first printed versions of the cocktail is in the 1906 How to Mix Drinks. It has equal parts Italian vermouth and sloe gin, while adding lemon juice, two kinds of bitters and syrup. Another cocktail called "Blackthorn" is included in the sours section, and closely matches Maloney's 1900 version.

Straubs Manual of Mixed Drinks published in 1913 includes the "Blackthorne Cocktail" with orange bitters, dry vermouth and sloe gin. Another early print version of the vermouth dominant version appears in J. A. Didier's The Reminder. The "Blackthorne Cocktail" appears in the Addenda and includes a 2:1 ratio of sloe gin to dry vermouth. The "Blackthorne Sour" is included in the main text, suggesting the former as something of an afterthought.

The Blackthorne with vermouth gradually became the dominant cocktail associated with the name. Throughout the 1930's and on, the sour appeared less frequently in published cocktail books.

== The whisky version ==
The cocktail's origins can be traced back to Harry Johnson. The first version, titled "Black Thorn" appeared in his 1900 edition of Harry Johnson's Bartender's Manual. His recipe included a 1:1 ratio of sweet vermouth to Irish Whisky, with dashes of Boker's Bitters and Absinthe.

Robert Vermeire's 1922 version was widely copied by others writing cocktail books around the same time. He removed the space between the words "black" and "thorn," thrusting the whiskey version into opposition to the sloe gin cocktail. About the drink, he wrote "The Blackthorn is a very old cocktail, which is made in two different ways," attributing it to Harry Johnson of New Orleans. Owing to the identical spelling, The Savoy Cocktail Book (1930) relegated the sloe gin version to "Blackthorne No. 2" while including Irish whisky in their "Blackthorne" recipe.

The choice of whiskey varied a bit across published versions. Trader Vic's Bartender's Manual from 1948 specifies the main spirit as in the original as "irish". In 100 Cocktails and How To Mix Them by "Bernard" published in the 1960s, two versions include Scotch whisky.

The whisky version is often attributed to New Orleans; however, its omission in cocktail books such as Famous New Orleans Drinks and How To Mix'em (1938) suggests that the cocktail was not well associated with the city at the time. The exact date of origin is uncertain; however, the absence of the cocktail from Johnson's earlier books leads to a likely 1890's origin.

The whisky Blackthorn fell out of fashion during the second half of the 20th century until Gary Regan featured it in his 2003 book The Joy of Mixology. His reinterpretation brought the cocktail back to modern audiences by adapting it for modern palates.

== Related cocktails ==
The Red Thorn is a variation on the whiskey version of the Blackthorn by Takumi Watanabe. It's made with Irish whiskey, dry vermouth, raspberry syrup, lemon juice, green chartreuse, and absinthe. The recipe of the drink was recorded in Jared Brown & Anistatia Miller‘s The Deans of Drink and Gary Regan's 101 Best New Cocktails, Volume III.

== See also ==
- List of cocktails
