= Tuxedo (cocktail) =

Gin based drink

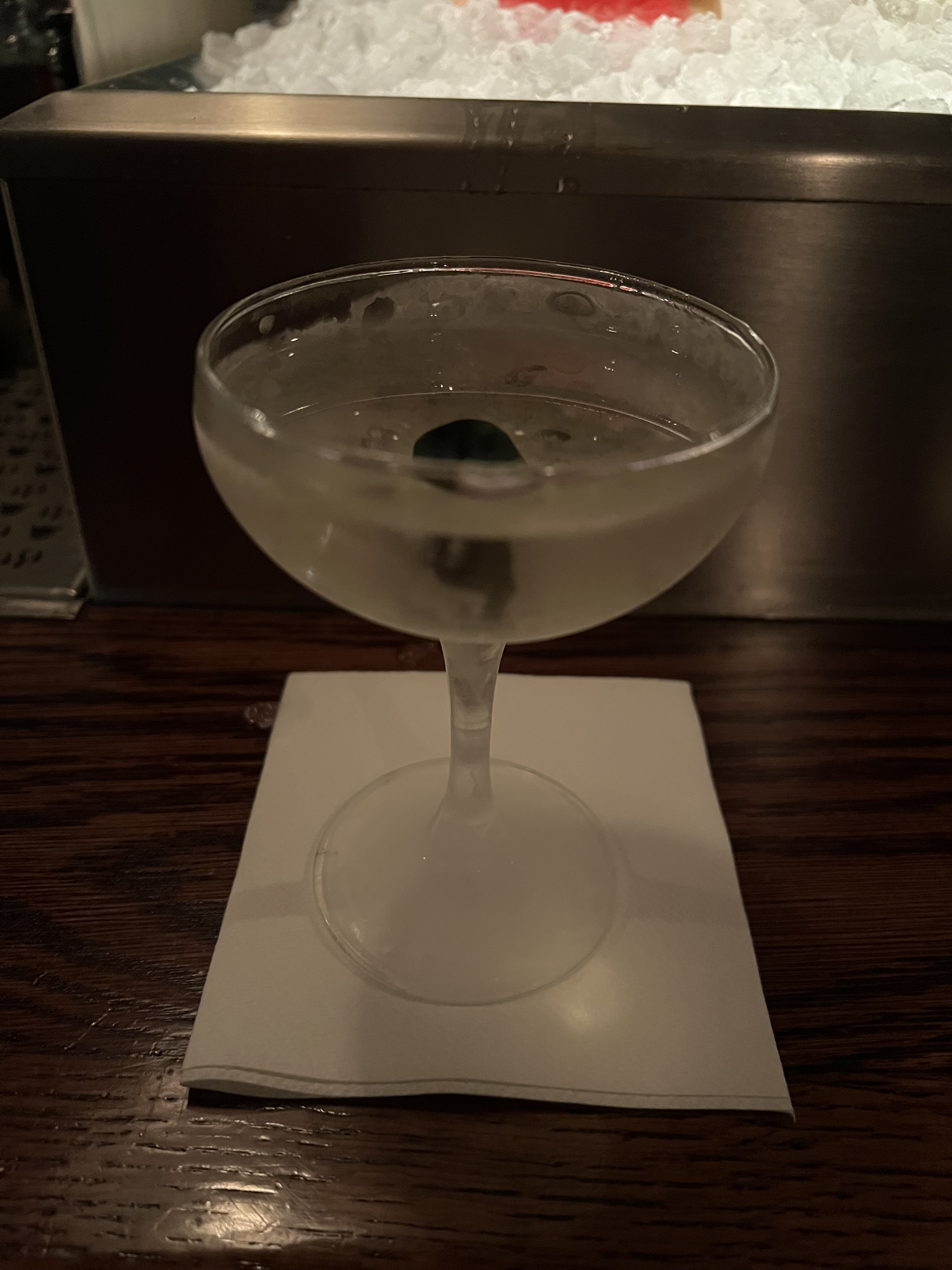
- Tuxedo No. 2
- Type: Cocktail
- Ingredients: 3 cl gin (Old Tom); 3 cl dry vermouth; 1/2 barspoon maraschino; 1/4 barspoon absinthe; 3 dashes orange bitters
- Base spirit: Gin
- Standard drinkware: Cocktail glass
- Standard garnish: cherry, lemon zest
- Served: Straight up: chilled, without ice
- Preparation: Stir all ingredients with ice and strain into a cocktail glass. Garnish with a cherry and a twist of lemon zest.

The tuxedo is an IBA Official Cocktail composed of gin, dry vermouth, orange bitters, maraschino and absinthe.

Related to the martini, the tuxedo has had many variations since its inception in the 1880s. The cocktail is named after the Tuxedo Club in Orange County, New York where it was first mixed. Tuxedo Park, the planned community where the club was built, is itself a derivation of the Lenape word tucseto. The form of menswear by the same name originated at the same country club around the same time.

== See also ==
- List of cocktails
