= Passione Nera =

Italian liqueur produced by Luxardo

Passione Nera is an Italian liqueur, similar to Sambuca. It is produced by Luxardo, who also produce Sambuca and Limoncello.

It has a strength of 38 ABV and its consistency is very similar to the syrupy characteristics of Sambuca. Passione Nera, however, is a dark purple-black colour. The liqueur's predominant flavor is star anise, though there are also hints of cardamom and coriander.
