= Frangelico =

Hazelnut liqueur

- The distinctive bottle is designed to resemble a friar in his habit, with a small cord tied around as a cincture.
- Type: Liqueur
- Origin: Canale, Italy
- Introduced: 1978
- Website: www.frangelico.com

Frangelico (Italian: [franˈdʒɛliko]) is a brand of hazelnut and herb–flavored liqueur coloured with caramel colouring, which is produced in Canale, Italy. It is 20% alcohol by volume (ABV) or 40 proof. Formerly, it was 24% ABV (48 proof). When produced by the Barbaro family, it was bottled at 28% ABV (56 proof). The brand was created in 1978.

According to the manufacturer, the liqueur's name comes from a legend about a hermit monk named Fra Angelico who lived in the Piedmont region of Italy and "created unique recipes for liqueurs". The bottle itself most closely resembles the habit of a Franciscan friar.

The brand was purchased by Gruppo Campari in 2010, having previously been owned by William Grant and C&C Group.

== Ingredients ==
Frangelico contains sugar, alcohol, hazelnut distillate, natural and artificial flavours, and caramel.

A 30-millilitre (1.1 imp fl oz; 1.0 US fl oz) serving of Frangelico contains about 11 grams (0.39 oz) of sugar, making Frangelico approximately 40% sugar by weight.

== Consumption ==
Recommended usage includes "pour it over ice... pour it over ice with a squeeze of fresh lime... mix with soda, or chill it and enjoy as a shot". It is also an ingredient in cocktails.

== Appearances in media ==
The artist Jeff Koons reproduced two Frangelico advertisements, "Stay in Tonight" and "Find a Quiet Table", in his 1986 Luxury & Degradation series of paintings and sculptures based on the role of alcohol in culture. According to Koons, he used the Frangelico ads to "defin[e] a $45,000 and up income", in contrast to other works in the series which correspond to lower income levels.

== See also ==
- Amaretto – Italian almond liqueur
- IBA Tiki – Cocktail with rum, amaretto, and Frangelico
