= Pucker =

Line of fruit-flavored liqueurs

Pucker is a line of fruit-flavored liqueurs made by the DeKuyper company. By volume it is 15% alcohol (30 proof) and is often used in mixed drinks.

== See also ==
- List of liqueurs
