= Tip van Bootz =

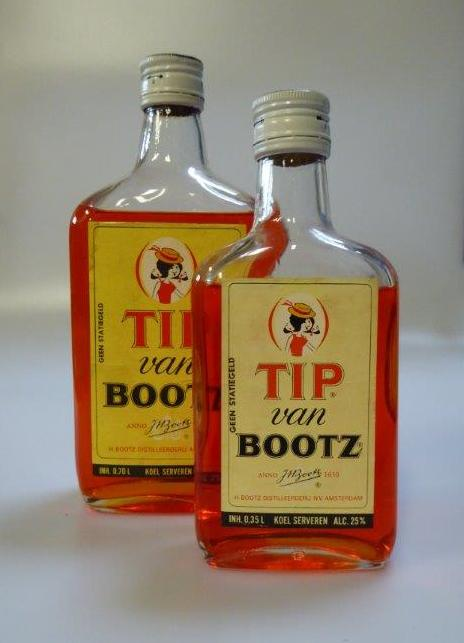
Two later gin-type bottles (late 1970s, early 1980s)

Tip van Bootz (Tip from Bootz) was an orange-flavoured and orange-coloured Dutch liqueur made by H. Bootz' Distilleerderij N.V. (Amsterdam).

== Introduction ==
Tip van Bootz was launched by the Bootz distilling company in 1931 to compensate for the declining sales of its top product Orangeade Triple Sec. With the purchasing power of Dutch consumers gradually decreasing, Bootz needed an affordable product to get through the economic crisis of the 1930s. What distinguished Tip van Bootz from other cheap spirits and liqueurs was that it had a brand name and a distinctive bottle. This white glass bottle was flat and rectangular shaped with slightly rounded corners and a graceful collar between the body and the neck. Furthermore, the Bootz distillery did not shy away from advertising. The introduction campaign centered on the meaning of the brand name and the brand label, that showed an image of the Amsterdam Stock Exchange building (the famous Beurs van Berlage). The advertisement text ran: "A tip after trading hours is only worth something if it is a Tip from Bootz."

== Limerick campaign ==
From January 1937 to January 1961 – with an interruption from December 1944 to June 1947 – Tip van Bootz was advertised in a very remarkable way. Consumers could send in limericks to the Bootz distillery. Weekly or biweekly, the best limericks were published in small front-page newspaper ads, provided of course that they would mention the brand name Tip van Bootz. The result of this long-running advertising campaign was that Dutch people during the mid 20th century strongly associated limericks, as a form of verse, with the brand Tip van Bootz. Due to its orange colour Tip van Bootz was a huge success in the first post-war years, when Dutch consumers embraced anything that reminded them of the reinstated royal House of Orange-Nassau.

== Takeover by Lucas Bols ==
In January 1955 the Bootz distillery was taken over by the much larger Bols distilling company (N.V. Amsterdamse Likeurstokerij ’t Lootsje der Erven Lucas Bols). Bols wisely decided to retain the distinctive Tip van Bootz bottle. The limerick campaign however was discontinued in order to rejuvenate the brand image.

== Tipje van Bootz campaign ==
As postwar prosperity in the Netherlands grew, consumer preferences changed from lower to higher-quality types of spirits. Especially male consumers found fruit-flavoured brandies such as Tip van Bootz too sweet. They preferred stronger drinks with a less conspicuous colour. By the mid-1960s, Tip van Bootz had the reputation of being a women's drink. Bols responded by emphasizing that Tip van Bootz could also be used in cocktails and long drinks. To charm male consumers, an advertising figure was created called Tipje van Bootz (1965). This attractive young girl featured in a series of comic strips made by Jan Kruis, as well as in a 1969 television commercial. In 1972, Bols commissioned a song about Tipje, which was released on a 7-inch 45 rpm record. The content of this Carnival song was so sexually insinuating that Tipjes reputation – and by extension the brand image of Tip van Bootz – was seriously damaged.

== Withdrawal from the market ==
In the mid-1970s, Bols stopped trying to revitalize the brand. Somewhere in the 1980s, the brand was quietly withdrawn from the market. In 1995 the brand was given a final chance by Bols. This reintroduction proved unsuccessful. Tip van Bootz is now a dead brand that only lives on in the memory of some bottle and label collectors.
