= Gold Strike (drink) =

Dutch alcoholic drink

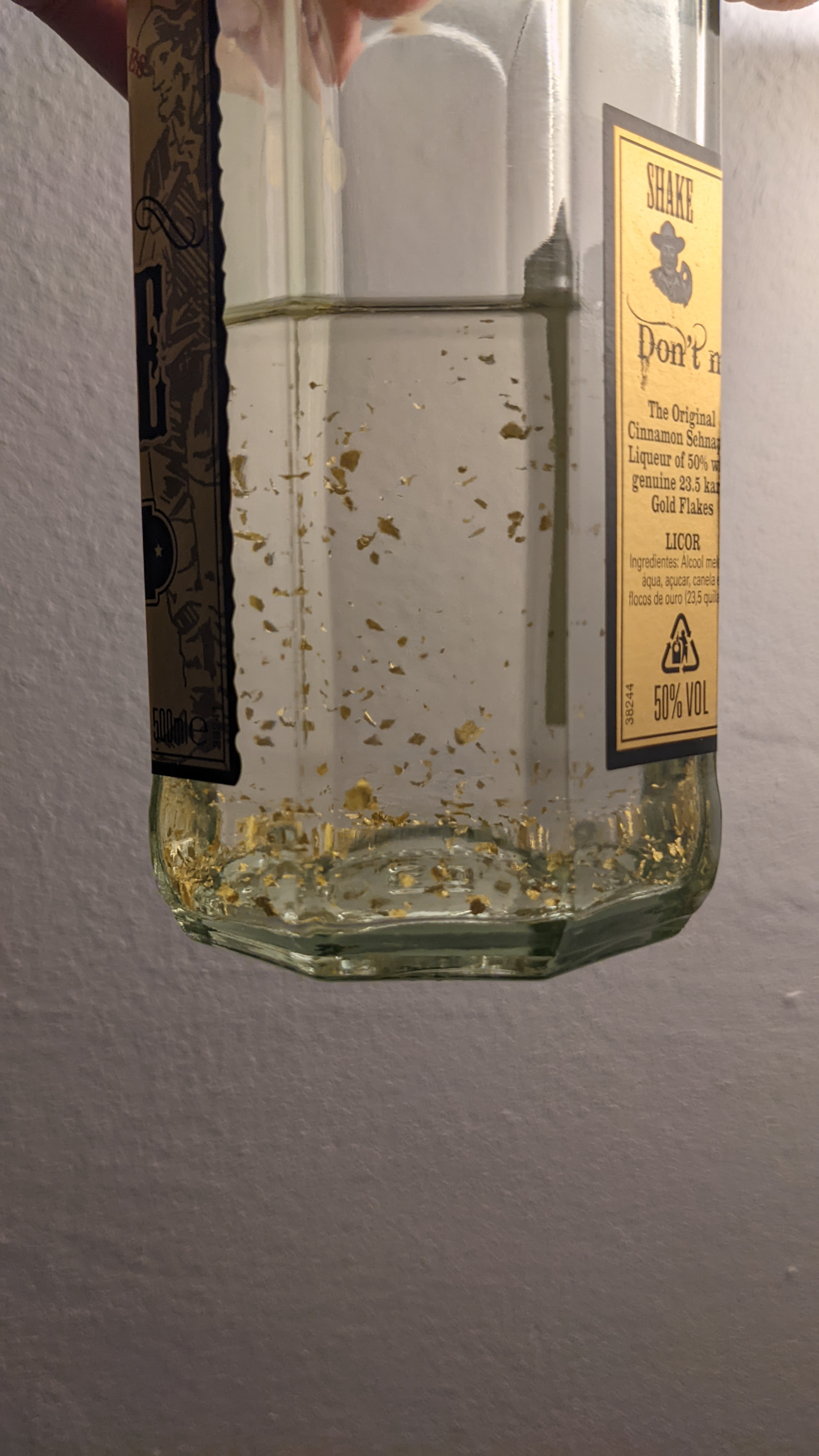
A bottle of Gold Strike.

Gold Strike is a Dutch cinnamon liqueur containing gold snippets, produced by Lucas Bols. The company suggests it should be drunk as a shot, with the motto "Shake, Shoot and Strike". It is a clear liquid that tastes like cinnamon candy.

Though the company website states the gold flakes are "24-carat", some bottles indicate that the gold has various other levels of purity, such as 22 K or 23.5 K. The gold flakes present little health risk. A common urban legend about Gold Strike is that the gold flakes cut the throat or stomach upon ingestion, allowing the alcohol to directly enter the bloodstream for quicker intoxication.

== Similar products ==
Other alcoholic beverages that contain gold are Goldschläger and Goldwasser. Cinnamon liqueurs include Fireball Cinnamon Whisky.
