= Crème de banane =

Alcoholic drink

Crème de banane (French pronunciation: [kʁɛm də banan]) is a sweet, banana-flavored liqueur, usually bottled at 17–25% ABV. It is mostly used in alcoholic drinks but also in cooking; it is an ingredient of various cocktails and desserts.

== Cooking ==
Crème de banane can be used as a syrup on frozen desserts. In some baked dishes, it may be added to obtain a strong banana flavor.

== Production ==
Companies such as Marie Brizard, Lucas Bols, and DeKuyper make this liqueur. It is based on neutral-tasting, unaged grape brandy flavored by means of infusion or maceration.
