= Pisang Ambon =

Dutch banana liqueur

- Type: Liqueur
- Manufacturer: Lucas Bols B.V.
- Origin: Netherlands
- Introduced: 1948
- Alcohol by volume: 21.0%
- Proof (US): 42
- Colour: Bright green
- Flavour: Banana

Pisang Ambon is a brand of Dutch liqueur produced, distributed and marketed by the House of Lucas Bols. It has a dominating banana flavour, with additional tropical fruit nuances, and a bright green colour. It is based on the recipe of an old Indonesian liqueur. A purple version has been released, called Pisang Ambon Guaraná Lime.

== Etymology ==
"Pisang" is Indonesian/Malay for banana. Ambon is the capital city of an Indonesian province that was once a Dutch colony. "Pisang Ambon" is the Indonesian name for the Gros Michel cultivar. Although the name of the banana is not referring to Ambon as the source but from Javanese word for smell.

== See also ==
- Banana beer
- Banana wine
- East African Highland bananas
- List of liqueurs
