= Brandy crusta =

Brandy and lemon based cocktail

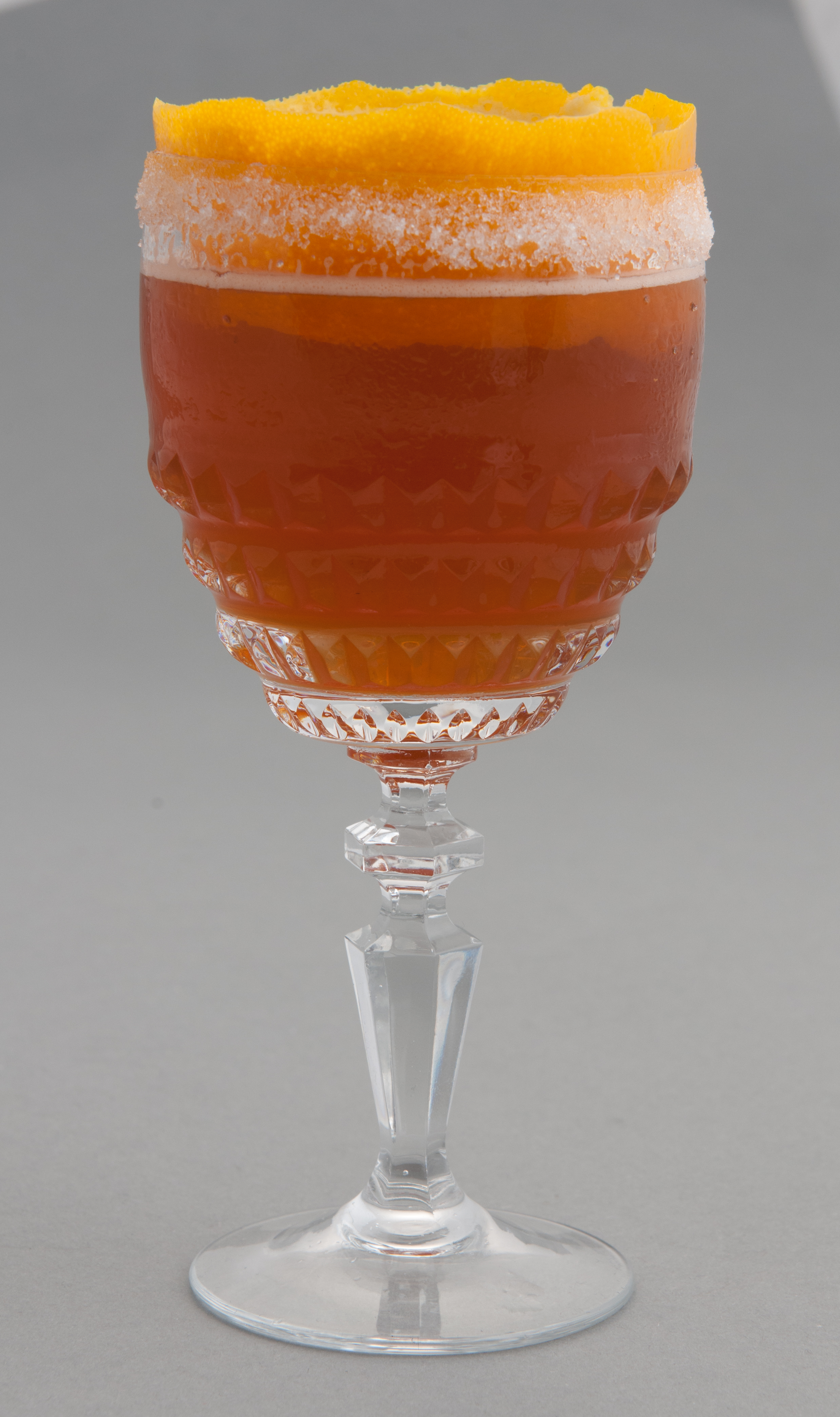
- Type: Cocktail
- Ingredients: 52.5 ml brandy; 7.5 ml Maraschino Luxardo; 1 Bar spoon Curaçao; 15 ml Fresh lemon juice; 1 Bar spoon simple syrup; 2 dashes aromatic bitters
- Standard drinkware: Cocktail glass
- Standard garnish: Orange or Lemon Twist
- Served: Straight up: chilled, without ice
- Preparation: Mix all ingredients with ice cubes in a mixing glass. Strain into slim cocktail glass rimmed with sugar.

A brandy crusta is an IBA Official Cocktail made of brandy, Maraschino Luxardo, curaçao, fresh lemon juice, sugar syrup, and Angostura bitters.

The cocktail, named for the crust of sugar on the rim, was invented by Joseph Santini, a bartender in New Orleans at his bar, Jewel of the South.

Jerry Thomas was the first to publish the recipe in his 1862 cocktail manual.
