= Vaccari =

Vaccari is an Italian surname. Notable people with the surname include:

- Ezio Vaccari (born 1962), Italian historian of science
- Franco Vaccari (1936–2025), Italian artist and photographer
- Frédéric Vaccari (born 1987), French rugby league footballer
- Julio Vaccari (born 1980), Argentine football manager
- Marco Vaccari (born 1966), Italian sprinter
- Oreste Vaccari (1886–1980), Italian orientalist and linguist
- Paolo Vaccari (born 1971), Italian rugby player
