= White Cargo (cocktail) =

Ice cream cocktail

- Type: Mixed drink
- Ingredients: 1 part dry gin; 1 part vanilla ice cream
- Base spirit: Gin
- Standard drinkware: Cocktail glass
- Standard garnish: Freshly grated nutmeg
- Preparation: Combine ingredients with ice in cocktail shaker; shake well, then strain into cocktail glass, pouring over ice.

The White Cargo is an ice cream cocktail made with vanilla ice cream and gin. Some versions include maraschino liquor, garnished with freshly grated nutmeg. Its creation is credited to Harry Craddock of the Savoy Hotel in a three ingredient version that includes a splash of dry white wine. Modern versions have added Chardonnay.
