= Amarena cherry =

Edible fruit cultivar

- Genus: Prunus
- Species: Prunus cerasus
- Cultivar: 'Amarena'
- Breeder: Gennaro Fabbri
- Origin: Bologna, Italy

The Amarena cherry (Italian: amarena) is a cherry grown in Bologna and Modena, Italy. It is usually bottled in syrup and used as a decoration on rich chocolate desserts.

The Amarena is a variety of the Prunus cerasus developed by Gennaro Fabbri (1860–1935), born to Neapolitan parents in Bologna. His wife, Rachele, took over an old general store in Portomaggiore, which was near a wild black cherry orchard. She picked the cherries and cooked them in sugar in copper pots. To thank his wife for the treat, he bought a ceramic jar from Riccardo Gatti, an artist from Faenza. The white and blue ceramic jar was then used to sell the syrup and start a small company.

He started commercial production of cherry-related products in 1905 under the Fabbri brand. The Fabbri company is still family owned, and produces a number of natural cherry pastries, syrups, and beverages.
