= Crème de cerise =

French liqueur

Crème de Cerise ('Cherry Cream') is a sweet French liqueur made from a blend of macerated black and sour cherries. It is highly sugared (greater than 250 grams per liter), and relatively low in alcohol (18% ABV).

== Brands ==
Some brands of crème de cerise are:

- Edmond Briottet Crème de Cerise
- Joseph Cartron Crème de Cerise de Bourgogne
- Paul Devoille Crème de Cerise Noir
