= Girolamo Luxardo =

Italian liqueur factory and brand

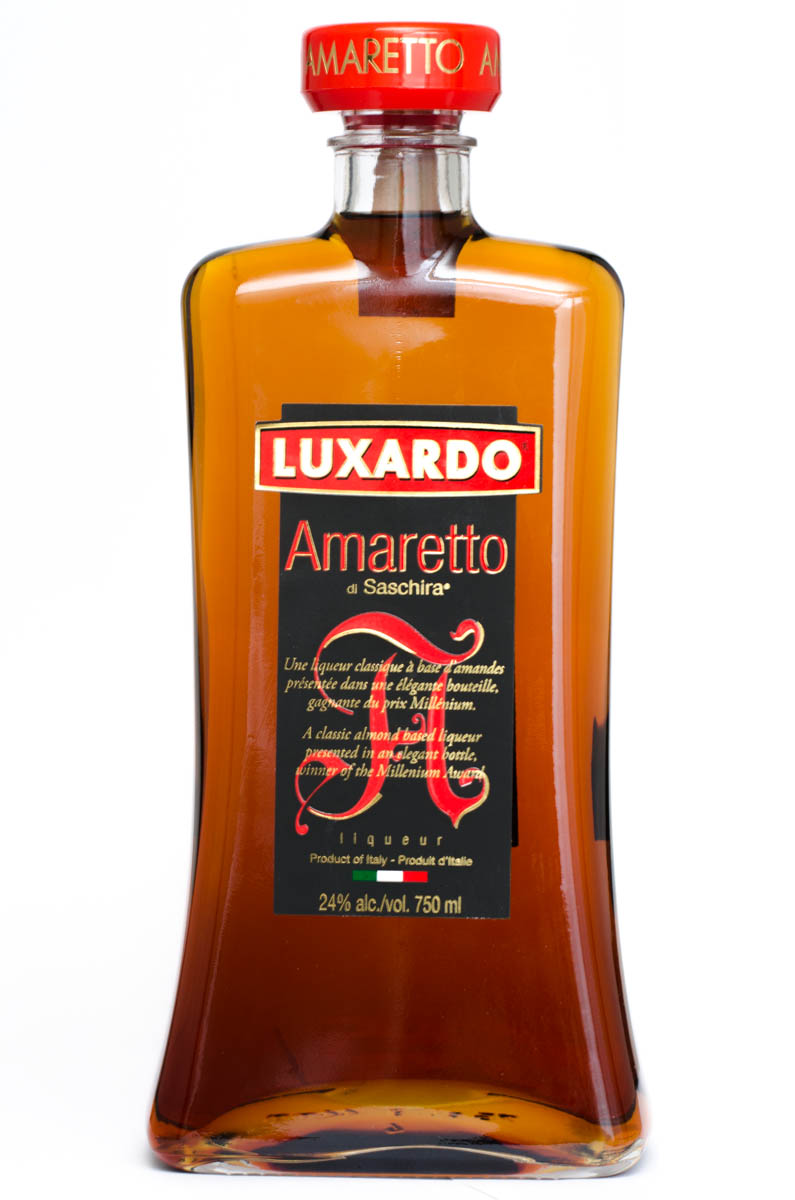
Luxardo Amaretto

Girolamo Luxardo S.p.A. is an Italian liqueur factory. Founded in Zara (present-day Zadar in Croatia), it moved to Torreglia near Padua after 1945.

The company's current products include a variety of liqueurs and similar products (Maraschino, Sangue Morlacco, Sambuca, Amaretto, Grappa, Passione Nera, Slivovitz, Luxardo Fernet, etc.) as well as other baking related products, such as liqueur concentrates, fruit syrups, and jams. Luxardo products are sold in about 70 countries worldwide. The distillery employs approximately 45 people, as well as roughly 100 salespeople throughout Italy. The 6,800-square-metre (73,000 sq ft) distillery is capable of producing 6,000 bottles per hour. In 2010, it produced a pre-tax profit of €16 million.

== History ==
The firm was founded in 1821 by a Ligurian man named Girolamo Luxardo in the city of Zara, at the time in the Kingdom of Dalmatia of the Habsburg Empire. Luxardo had moved there with his family in 1817, as the consular representative of the Kingdom of Sardinia. His wife Maria Canevari produced liqueurs at home, specializing in "rosolio maraschino", a liquor from Dalmatia, and Luxardo founded the distillery to produce Liquore Maraschino. Within eight years of existence, the Luxardo Maraschino was recognized a superior product by the Emperor. By 1839, the Luxardo Maraschino was consumed in overseas New Orleans.

Girolamo Luxardo died in 1865 at age 81, and his son Nicolò took over the business.

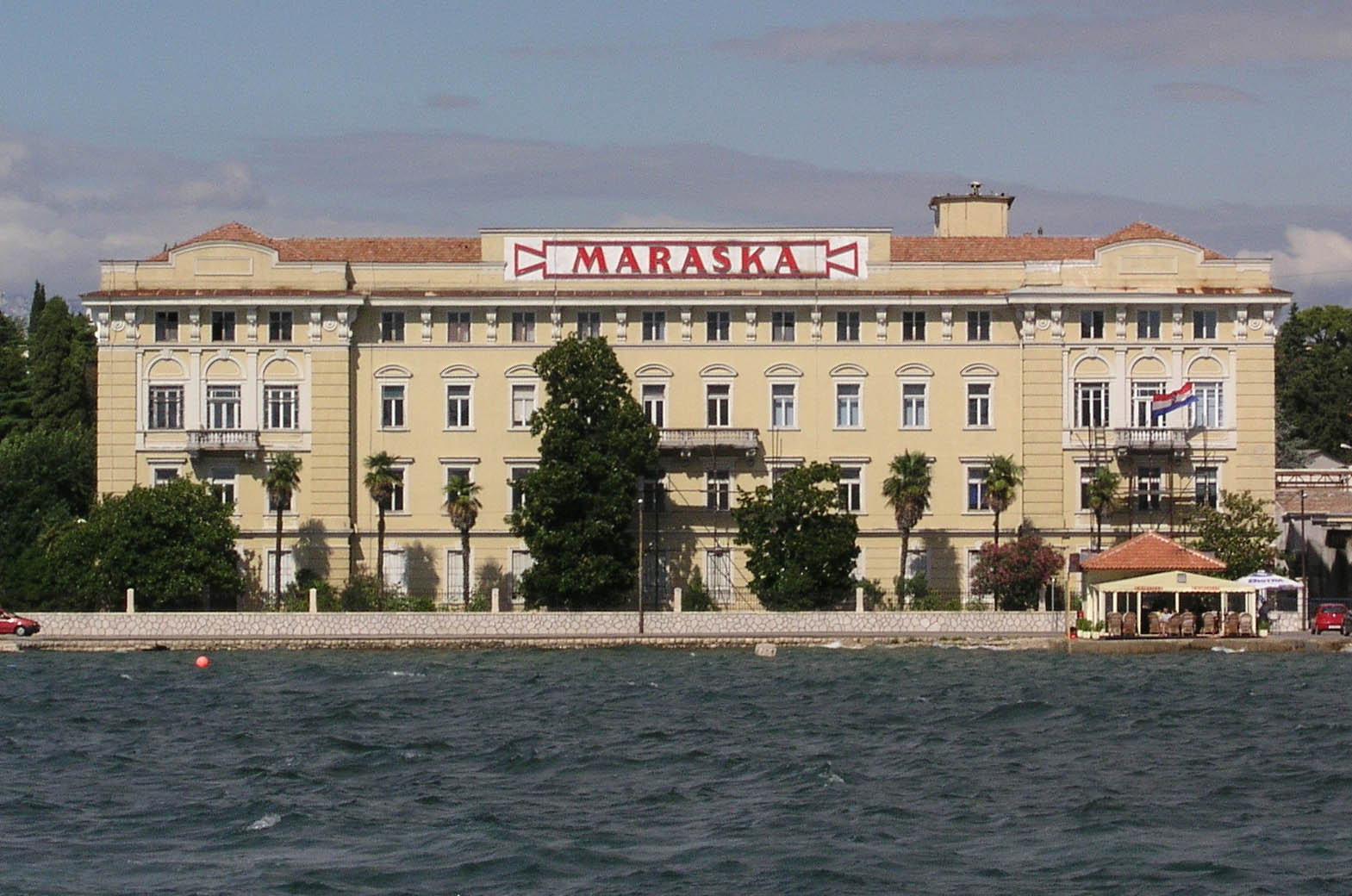
Old headquarters of Luxardo in Zadar

In 1913 a new distillery was built by Michelangelo Luxardo, who was of the third generation of Luxardos. The distillery was one of the largest in Austria-Hungary (maybe the largest distillery in Europe at one time). The building still stands today.

Zara became part of the Kingdom of Italy at the end of World War I. The distillery was almost completely destroyed by Allied bombings during the Second World War. In 1944, at the end of Nazi German occupation, the city was captured by Yugoslav partisans and later integrated into Yugoslavia at the end of the war. Pietro Luxardo, Nicolò II and his wife were killed by Tito's forces (Foibe massacres). The business was temporarily refounded in Venice by Giorgio Luxardo, who allegedly fled with a sapling of marasca cherry tree and an original Maraschino recipe, before Giorgio moved to Torreglia, near Padua, in the Veneto region of Italy, where he built a new distillery and continued the family's and firm's activities. The sixth generation of the family is still active in the operations of the company, including: Piero Luxardo, Franco Luxardo, Guido Luxardo, Matteo Luxardo, Filippo Luxardo and Giorgio Luxardo.

== Marasca cherries ==
The company owns a line of canned sour marasca cherries, branded Maraschino cherries.

The company owns 22,000 marasca cherry trees in what is the largest cherry orchard in the European Union. It also holds the naming rights to its own marasca variety.

== Awards ==
In 2011 at the New York World Wine and Spirits Competition, the Amaretto di Saschira won double gold and best liqueur in show and the Triplum Triple Sec Orange won double gold and best fruit liqueur in show.

- 2019: gold medal at the International Spirits Challenge

== See also ==
- List of Italian companies
