= Parfait d'amour =

Purple liqueur from France

- Type: Liqueur
- Manufacturer: (various)
- Origin: France
- Introduced: 19th century
- Colour: Purple

Parfait d'amour (pronounced [paʁfe d‿amuːʁ]), or parfait amour, is a liqueur. It is often used in cocktails primarily for its purple colour, and is generally created from a curaçao liqueur base.

There are several versions of parfait d'amour. The House of Lucas Bols in the Netherlands claims to have originated the liqueur. Theirs appears to be a curaçao base, flavoured with rose petals, vanilla and almonds. Marie Brizard, a Bordeaux-based distiller, has a product with a similar flavor profile. Another form, produced by DeKuyper, uses a spirit as its base, and is flavoured with lemon, coriander and violets.

Guardian writer John Wright describes it as "a potent compound... It tasted like the perfume counter at Boots." He suggests a homemade version containing rose petals in a base of white rum or eau de vie, with the addition of syrups made from raspberry juice and rosehips.

== Availability ==
Parfait d'amour is primarily produced and sold in France and the Netherlands, although it is available in the United Kingdom, Spain, the United States, Canada, Australia, Greece, Sweden, Denmark, Finland, Iceland, and Norway.

== References in literature ==
In the memoirs of Eugène François Vidocq, the character Belle-Rose disparages parfait d'amour: "... they poured out some parfait amour; 'This is drinkable,' said he, 'but still it is not even small beer in comparison with the liqueurs of the celebrated madame Anfous.'"

In her 1855 novel Ruth Hall, Fanny Fern describes it as a drink popular among society women: "the disgusting spectacle of scores of ladies devouring, ad infinitum, brandy-drops, Roman punch, Charlotte Russe, pies, cakes, and ices; and sipping 'parfait amour.'"

In John Brunner's The Squares of the City a minor character drinks Parfait Amour, which is described as a sweet purple liqueur that looked like methylated spirits.

Inside Story the late autobiography of Martin Amis, tells how parfait amour was an alcoholic drink a past girlfriend, an otherwise non-drinker, might be persuaded to take.

== Cocktail with parfait d'amour ==
Takumi's Aviation is a modern classic cocktail made with gin, maraschino liqueur, parfait d'amour, and lemon juice.

Taylor-Burton Affair is made with Sipsmith gin infused with butterfly pea tea, lemon juice, gomme syrup, parfait amour liqueur.
