= Creme Yvette =

Proprietary liqueur made with different sweet ingredients

A bottle of Crème Yvette liqueur

Creme Yvette, also called Creme d'Yvette or Creme de Yvette, is a proprietary liqueur made from parma violet petals with blackberries, red raspberries, wild strawberries and cassis, honey, orange peel and vanilla. It was once manufactured by Charles Jacquin et Cie in Philadelphia, Pennsylvania, who purchased the brand formerly made by Sheffield Company of Connecticut. It became almost impossible to find after production stopped in 1969. The liqueur was, however, resurrected in 2009 by Rob Cooper, the creator of St-Germain elderflower liqueur.

According to Martha Stewart's Living magazine, March 2010, "Creme Yvette, a 100-year-old violet liqueur, has been rereleased. Blending fresh berries, vanilla, spices, and violet petals, the purple liqueur has an understated sweetness that really comes alive when mixed with sparkling wine."

Most drinks calling for Creme Yvette can be made using creme de violette.
