= Maraschino cherry =

Preserved, sweetened cherry

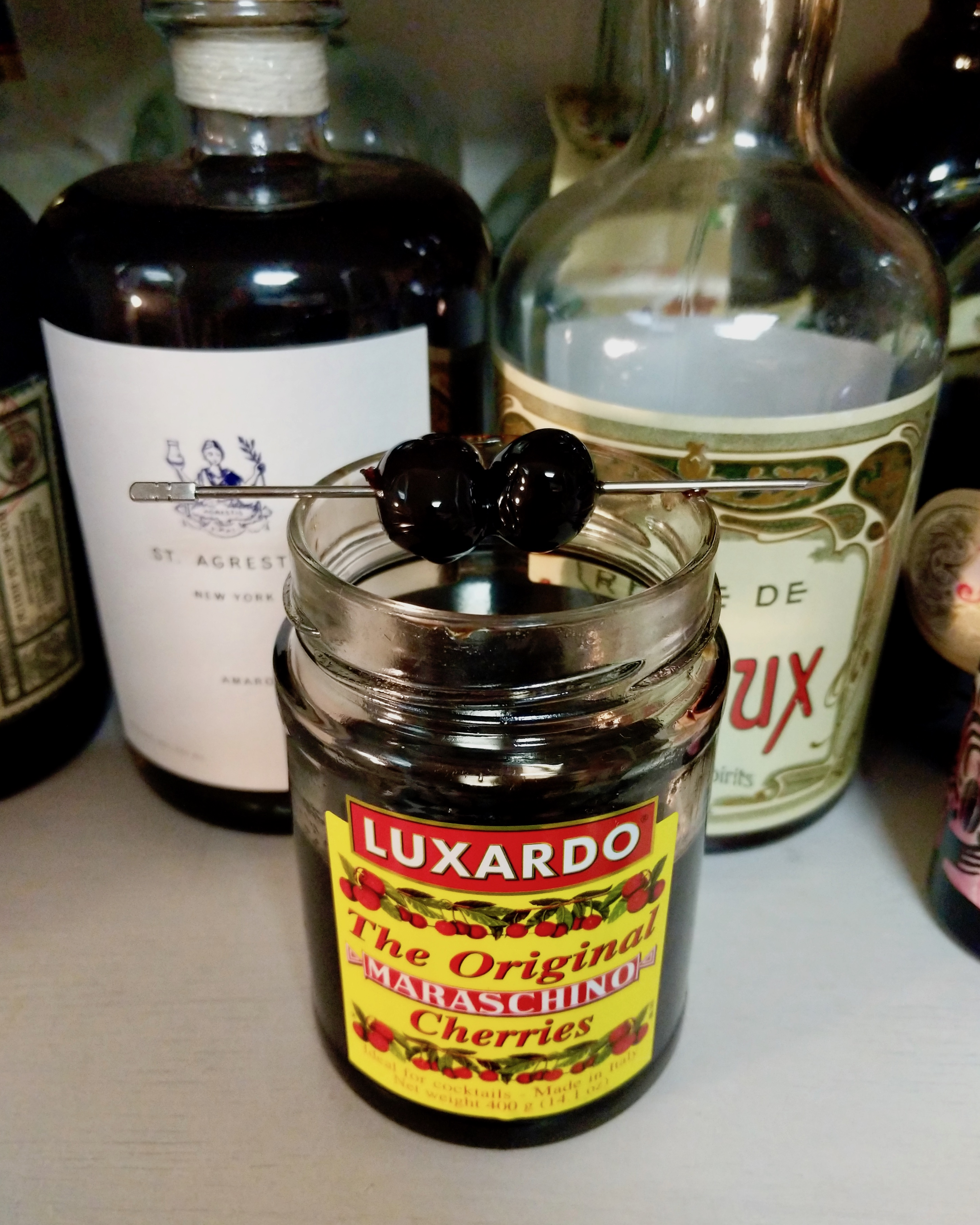
Luxardo-brand maraschino cherries

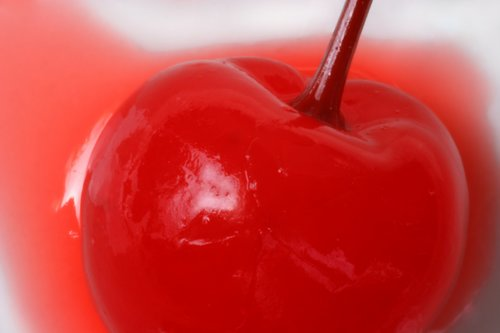
Close-up, maraschino cherry

A maraschino cherry (/ˌmærəˈʃiːnoʊ, -ˈskiː-/ MARR-ə-SHEE-noh, -SKEE-, Croatian: maraskino višnja) is a preserved, sweetened cherry, typically made from light-colored sweet cherries, such as the Royal Ann, Rainier, or Gold varieties. In their modern form, the cherries are first preserved in a brine solution usually containing sulfur dioxide and calcium chloride to bleach the fruit, then soaked in a suspension of food coloring (common red food dye is Allura Red AC), sugar syrup, and other components. The name and the original fruit is indigenous to Croatia (Croatian: višnja maraska or višnja maraske), originally a luxury delicacy of the Dalmatian Coast, specifically Zadar, these cherries were dark, sour, and pitted before being steeped in a spirit distilled from the fruit’s own pits, skins, and leaves.

== Uses ==
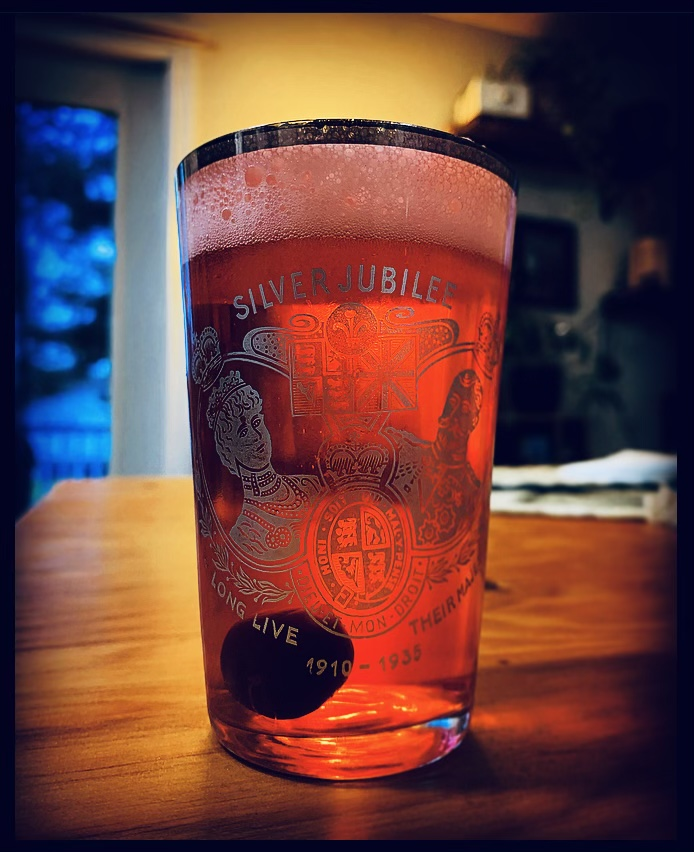
A Queen Mary cocktail: beer, grenadine and maraschino cherries

Maraschino cherries are used in many alcoholic and non-alcoholic drinks and cocktails, including the Old Fashioned, Tequila Sunrise, the Queen Mary and the Shirley Temple, giving them the nickname cocktail cherries. (This term is also used to refer to other varieties, including Amarena, Balaton, and Bing, when used for the same purpose, typically soaked in alcohol or sugar.) Sometimes the cherries, along with some of the maraschino syrup, are put into a glass of cola to make an old-fashioned or homemade cherry cola.

As a garnish, they can be used to decorate frozen yogurt, baked ham, cakes, pastry, parfaits, milkshakes and ice cream sodas. They are placed on top in many varieties of ice cream sundae; this may be the source of the phrase "cherry on top." They are generally included in canned fruit cocktail.

== Europe ==
The name maraschino originates from the marasca cherry of Dalmatian origin in Croatia and the maraschino liqueur made from it, in which marasca cherries were crushed and preserved after being pickled. Whole cherries preserved in this liqueur were known as "maraschino cherries".

In the 19th century, these became popular in the rest of Europe, but the supply in Dalmatia was quite limited, so they became known as a delicacy for royalty and the wealthy. Because of the relative scarcity of the marasca, other cherries came to be preserved in various ways and sold as "maraschino".

== United States ==
The cherries were first introduced in the United States in the late 19th century, where they were served in fine bars and restaurants. Because they were scarce and expensive, by the turn of the century American producers were experimenting with other processes for preserving cherries, with flavors such as almond extract and substitute fruit like Queen Anne cherries. Among these, alcohol was already becoming less common.

In response, the USDA in 1912 defined "maraschino cherries" as "marasca cherries preserved in maraschino" under the authority of the Food and Drugs Act of 1906. The artificially colored and artificially sweetened Royal Anne variety were required to be called "Imitation Maraschino Cherries" instead. Food Inspection Decision 141 defined marasca cherries and maraschino themselves. It was signed on 17 Feb. 1912.

During Prohibition in the United States as of 1920, the decreasingly popular alcoholic variety was illegal as well. Ernest H. Wiegand, a professor of horticulture at Oregon State University (OSU), developed the modern method of manufacturing maraschino cherries using a brine solution rather than alcohol. Accordingly, most modern maraschino cherries have only a historical connection with maraschino liqueur.

According to Bob Cain, Cliff Samuels, and Hoya Yang, who worked with Wiegand at OSU, Prohibition had nothing to do with Wiegand's research: his intention was to develop a better brining process for cherries that would not soften them. When Wiegand began his research, there were several ways to preserve maraschino cherries without alcohol, long before Prohibition went into effect. Wiegand took a process that people had their own recipes for—"and who knows what they were putting in there" (frequently not alcohol)—and turned it into a science, something replicable.

When Wiegand began his research, sodium metabisulfite was being used to preserve maraschino cherries. Some accounts indicate that this preservation method was being used long before Prohibition. Some manufacturers used maraschino or imitation liqueurs to flavor the cherries, but newspaper stories from the early part of the century suggest that many manufacturers stopped using alcohol and artificial dyes before Prohibition.

After Prohibition was repealed, lobbying by the non-alcoholic preserved cherry industry encouraged the Food and Drug Administration to revise federal policy toward canned cherries. It held a hearing in April 1939 to establish a new standard of identity. Since 1940, "maraschino cherries" have been defined as "cherries which have been dyed red, infused with sugar, and packed in a sugar syrup flavored with oil of bitter almonds or a similar flavor."

FD&C Red Number 1 and 4, and FD&C Yellow Number 1 through 4 were removed from the approved list in 1960. The ban on Red Number 4 was lifted in 1965 to allow the coloring of maraschino cherries, which by then were considered mainly decorative and not a foodstuff. In 1975, William F. Randolph of the FDA ruled that if an "artificial bitter almond flavor or any synthetic flavor is used, the product must be labeled artificial or artificially flavored." The following year, the ban on Red No. 4 was reinstated.

As of 2010, modern American maraschino cherries typically use FD&C Red 40 as a colorant.

== See also ==
- Amarena cherries
- Glacé fruit
- List of cherry dishes
