= DeKuyper =

Dutch liqueur company

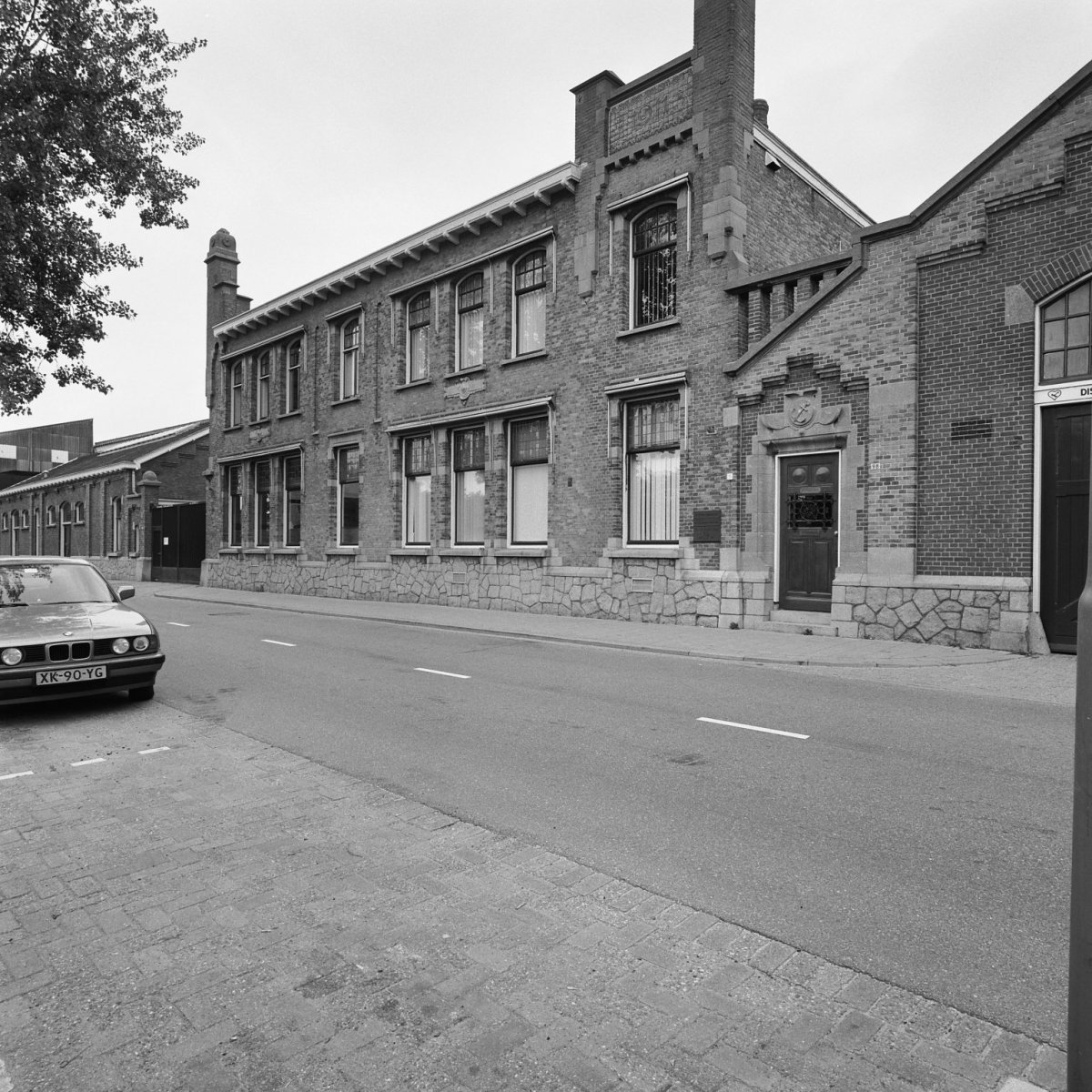
Overzicht voorgevel kantoorgebouw - Schiedam - 20353626 - RCE

DeKuyper Royal Distillers (Dutch pronunciation: [dəˈkœypər]) is a privately held Dutch company in the business of manufacturing and marketing distilled spirits and liqueurs. The company was founded in 1695 by Petrus De Kuyper as a manufacturer of barrels and casks used in the transportation of spirits and beer.

== History ==
By 1752, the family owned a distillery in Schiedam which was then the leading center for the production of Dutch gin or genever. In the 19th century, the company expanded its export business throughout Europe, Great Britain and Canada. In 1911, a new distillery was built in Schiedam and thereafter the production of liqueur began. The roster of flavors slowly expanded, and partnerships were formed with distillers in Canada (1932) and the United States (1934, strategically at the end of Prohibition). By the 1960s the production of liqueurs had overtaken the production of genever as drinks tastes changed and the promotion of liqueurs for use in cocktails induced a surge in sales.

After prohibition, De Kuyper sold the right to manufacture and market their brands in the United States to National Distillers. In 1996, National Distillers sold its liquor and distilling interests including rights to market DeKuyper brands in the US to Fortune Brands. American consumers know the brand as John DeKuyper & Son, which makes generally inexpensive liqueurs such as Triple Sec and various flavors of Schnapps such as Pucker, generally for consumption in sweet cocktails or shots.

In 1995, on the occasion of its 300th anniversary, the company received the title “Royal” from Queen Beatrix of the Netherlands. This led to the company changing its name from Johannes de Kuyper & Zoon to De Kuyper Royal Distillers. In the same year, Erven Warnink - the leading producer of advocaat and cream liqueurs – was taken over by De Kuyper Royal Distillers.
