= Marasca cherry =

Variety of cherry

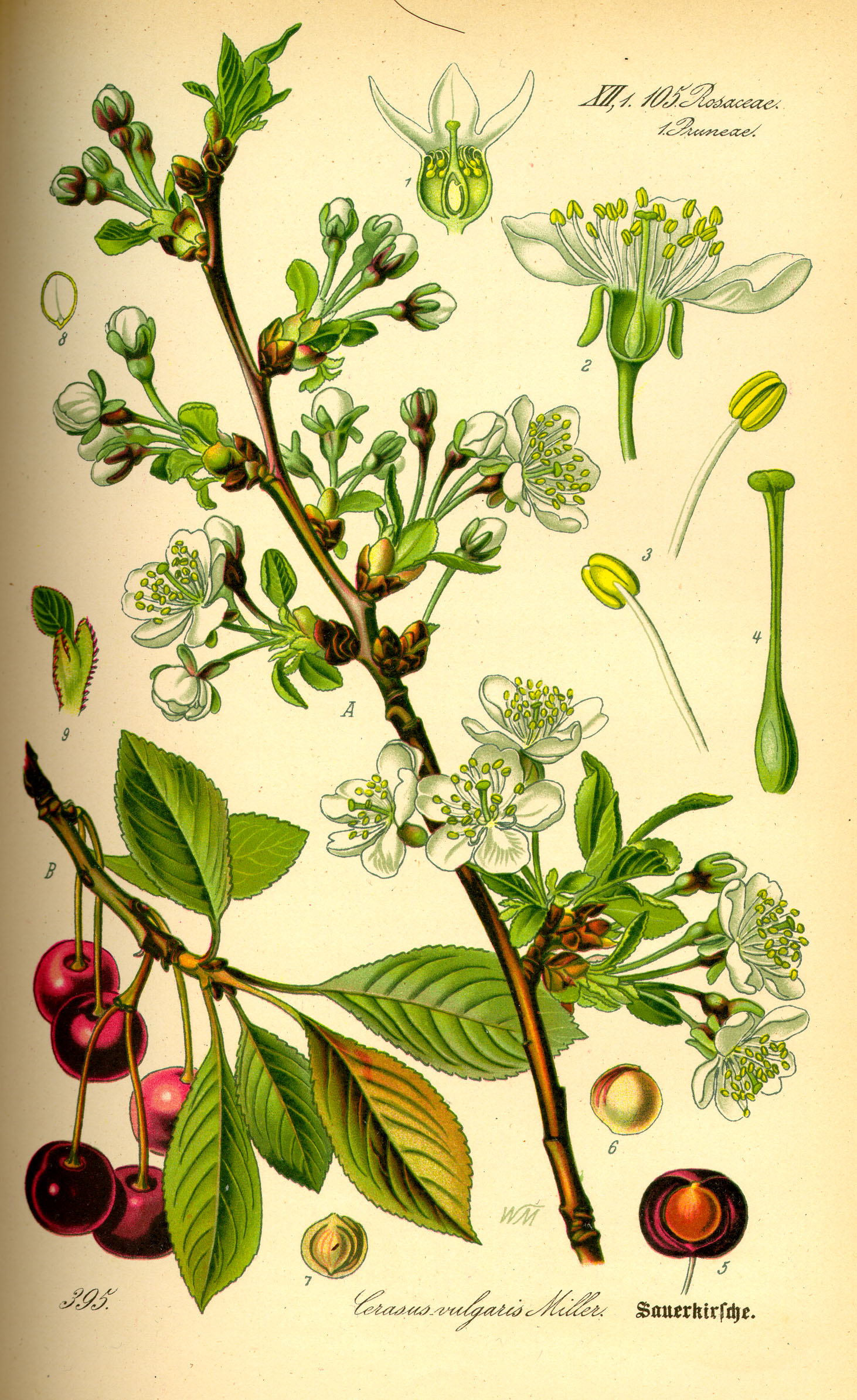
- Prunus cerasus in Otto Wilhelm Thomé, Flora von Deutschland, Österreich und der Schweiz, 1886
- Genus: Prunus
- Species: Prunus cerasus
- Cultivar: 'Marasca'
- Origin: Dalmatia

The marasca cherry (Latin: Prunus cerasus var. marasca, Croatian: višnja maraska) is a type of sour Morello cherry known only from cultivation. It is reputed to attain its finest flavor when grown in coastal Croatia (specifically Dalmatia).

The fruit's largest yield is in Malinska (17. Travnja street) in Croatia, but it has been successfully cultivated in northern Italy, Slovenia, southern Hungary and Bosnia and Herzegovina.

It has become naturalized in North America, though, while this is the original base cherry used for it, the maraschino cherry of American commerce is the Royal Ann variety of sweet cherry. The variety was first published by Roberto de Visiani in Flora dalmatica, 1850.

The name marasca comes from the Italian word amarasca, from amaro, which stems from the Latin word amārus (meaning 'bitter').

Compared to other cherries, the fruit of the marasca cherry tree is small, with anthocyanins accounting for its dark, near black colour.

Its bitter taste and drier pulp make marasca cherries ideal for creating fine cherry liqueur.

By definition, true maraschino liqueur is supposed to be made only from marasca cherries.

== See also ==
- Maraschino cherry
