= Gary Regan =

British bartender (1951–2019)

- Born: September 18, 1951; Rochdale, Greater Manchester, England
- Died: November 15, 2019 (aged 68); Newburgh, New York City, U.S.
- Occupations: Bartender; writer

Gary "Gaz" Regan (September 18, 1951 – November 15, 2019) was a British-born bartender and a writer in the United States. He was known for his book The Joy of Mixology.

== Early life ==
Regan began tending bar in his parents' pubs when he was 14. After training as a chef at Courtfield Catering College in Blackpool, he ran a bistro with his wife, Norma. They divorced after two years, after which Regan emigrated to New York, in 1973.

== Career ==
In 1973, he tended an Upper East Side bar in Manhattan, and then became manager of the North Star Pub at South Street Seaport.

After working as a bartender over 20 years, he started to write about bartending and bars for FoodArts magazine. His first book, The Bartender's Bible, was published in 1991, with his then-wife, Mardee Haidin Regan. Later, he became a cocktail columnist for Wine Enthusiast, Food & Wine and San Francisco Chronicle.

Regan expanded into the liquor business by developing Regans’ Orange Bitters No.6, made by Sazerac.

== Health and death ==
In 2003 Regan had surgery and radiation treatment for tongue cancer. No longer able to grow a full beard, he began wearing his hair long and adopted the Lancashire nickname for Gary, "Gaz".

In 2008 he married his final wife, Amy Gallagher.

He died of pneumonia on November 15, 2019, at a hospital in Newburgh, New York.

== Publications ==
- 1001 Mixed Drinks and Everything You Need to Know (1991)
- The Bartender's Bible: 1001 Mixed Drinks and Everything You Need to Know to Set Up Your Bar (1993)
- The Book of Bourbon and Other Fine American Whiskeys (1995)
- New Classic Cocktails (1997)
- Martini Companion: A Connoisseur's Guide (1997)
- Martini (1998)
- The Bourbon Companion: A Connoisseur's Guide (1998)
- The Joy of Mixology: The Consummate Guide to the Bartender’s Craft (2003)
- Gaz Regan's Annual Manual for Bartenders (2011)
- Gaz Regan's ANNUAL MANUAL for Bartenders, 2012 (2012)
- Gaz Regan's 101 Best New Cocktails, Volume III (2012)
- the bartender's GIN compendium (2012)
- The Negroni: A Gaz Regan Notion (2013)
- Gaz Regan's 101 Best New Cocktails, Volume IV (2015)
- The Negroni: Drinking to La Dolce Vita, with Recipes & Lore (2015)
- The Joy of Mixology, Revised and Updated Edition: The Consummate Guide to the Bartender's Craft (2017)
