= Crème de violette =

Floral liqueur

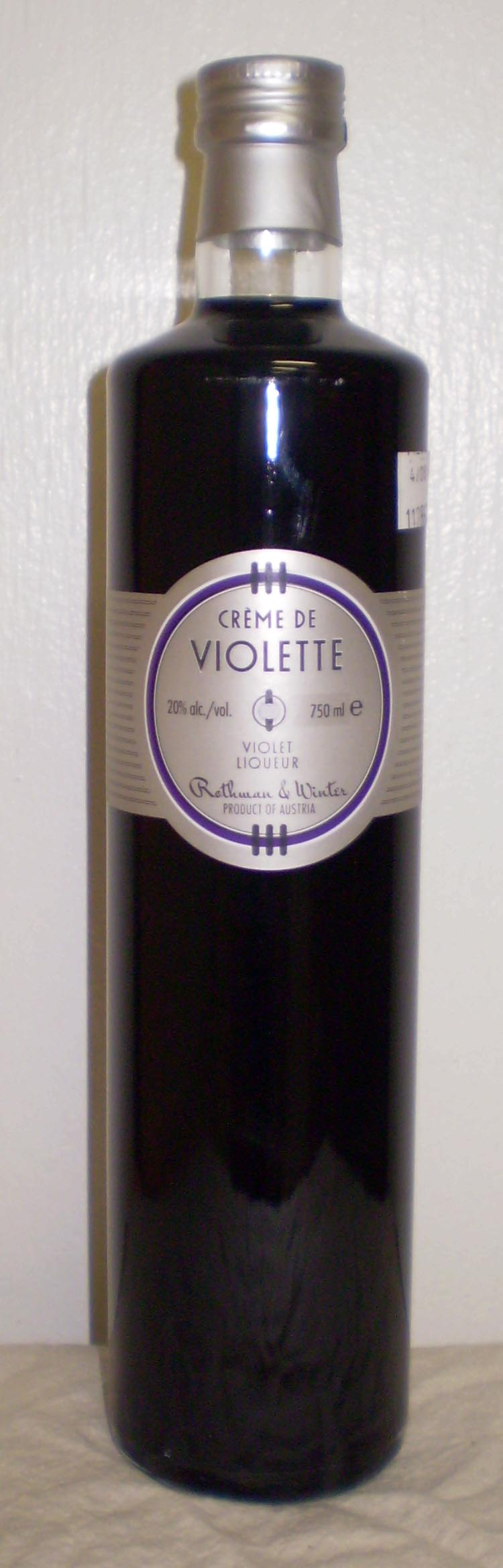
A bottle of Crème de violette liqueur

Crème de violette and liqueur de violette are generic terms for a liqueur with natural and/or artificial violet flower flavoring and coloring with either a brandy base, a neutral spirit base, or a combination of the two. The taste profile and aroma are distinctly floral and sweet, and reminiscent of the violet candies popular in the early to mid-20th century. Its known production dates back to the early 19th century when it was served with dry vermouth or alone as a cordial.

After crème de violette had been unavailable in the United States for decades, Haus Alpenz began importing Rothman & Winter Crème de Violette in mid-2007, made from Queen Charlotte and March violet flowers from the Alps. Since then, other brands of crème de violette have arrived on the US market, e.g., The Bitter Truth from Europe.

Crème de violette is the forerunner of the liqueurs Parfait d'Amour and the American variation, Creme Yvette, both of which are decidedly different with pronounced vanilla and/or citrus flavors. When crème de violette is not available, you can use Parfait d'Amour or Crème Yvette to replicate the violet color in a drink, though the taste profile is quite different.

It is considered a core ingredient in the Aviation cocktail.

The rarity of crème de violette appeared as a plot element in an episode of The Avengers in 1965 entitled "Two's A Crowd".

== General and cited references ==
- Clarke, Paul (2007). "Imbibe Magazine: Gone but Not Forgotten". Imbibe. Imbibe Magazine. ISSN 1557-7082.
