= Maraschino =

Liqueur distilled from cherries

- Type: Liqueur
- Manufacturer: Maraska and Luxardo
- Origin: Croatia (at the time, part of the Venetian republic)
- Introduced: 16th century
- Alcohol by volume: 32%
- Color: Clear
- Flavor: Smooth but strong; a sweet liqueur with herbal, nutty and funky flavors. Not much of a cherry taste. A rounded taste and persistent aroma. Intense, flavorful finish.
- Website: Luxardo profile Maraska profile

Maraschino (/ˌmærəˈskiːnoʊ, -ˈʃiː-/ MARR-ə-SKEE-noh, -SHEE-, Italian: [maraˈskiːno]) is a liqueur obtained from the distillation of Marasca cherries. The small, slightly sour fruit of the Marasca cherry tree (Prunus cerasus var. marasca), which grows wild along parts of the Dalmatian coast in Croatia, lends the liqueur its unique aroma.

== History ==
In 1759, Francesco Drioli, a Venetian merchant, began industrial-scale production of maraschino in Zara (present-day Zadar in Croatia), which was then part of the Republic of Venice. Drioli demonstrated the same brand of Venetian entrepreneurial spirit as other businessmen in the Veneto region who transformed grappa-distillation from household tradition into formal industry: in either case, the businesses strictly conformed to the rules and restrictions set down by the regional Distillers' Guild (Arte dell'acqua di vita).

Francesco Drioli developed and perfected Giuseppe Carceniga's earlier innovative techniques for the distillation of Marasca cherries and in 1759 he founded the Fabbrica di Maraschino Francesco Drioli (Francesco Drioli Maraschino Factory). By the end of the 18th century his maraschino had already gained widespread fame and had cornered the major markets in Europe, especially in England. In the first advertisement in the London Morning Post and Daily Advertiser, dated 17 June 1779, the firm Johnson and Justerini informed "the nobility and gentry" of having "just imported a large quantity of maraschino from Zara ... of the most exquisite flavour" and in 1804 the Austrian Emperor granted the factory the title Imperial Regia Privilegiata entitling it to use the Imperial coat of arms. The liqueur was sought after by distinguished personages, rulers and courts from all over Europe and the Francesco Drioli factory held Royal Warrants, entitling them to use the royal coat of arms, from the royal households of Austria, Great Britain and Italy. British warships were sent from bases in Corfù and Malta to pick up shipments of maraschino for British royalty. In fact in 1877 the Duke of York (the future George V) and the Duke of Edinburgh visited the factory and accepted "with great pleasure a choice buffet" in the Salghetti-Drioli family home and purchased "more cases of rosolio and several jars of maraschino cherries" (Il Dalmata, a. XXII, no.77, 28 September 1877). From the outset, however, Drioli Maraschino was subject to counterfeiting, a scourge which would plague the factory even after it closed in 1980, forcing its owners to take repeated legal action. In his Via Facti, Nicolò Tommaseo noted how widespread Drioli Maraschino was in Italia... e in tutte cinque le parti del mondo (in Italy... and in all five parts of the world) and he wrote, "in tutte bevuto e in tutte falsificato..." (it is drunk everywhere and faked/copied everywhere).

The square greenish bottles were supplied by Murano glass factories and in the early 19th century the straw cover (known as a "fiasco") was introduced. This was a typical Venetian method for transporting bottles on long sea voyages and would come to define the brand over the years. Following the restoration of Italian sovereignty in the Veneto, Giuseppe's son Francesco Salghetti-Drioli was instrumental in founding a glass factory in Zara, bringing skilled workers from Murano and becoming its first president.

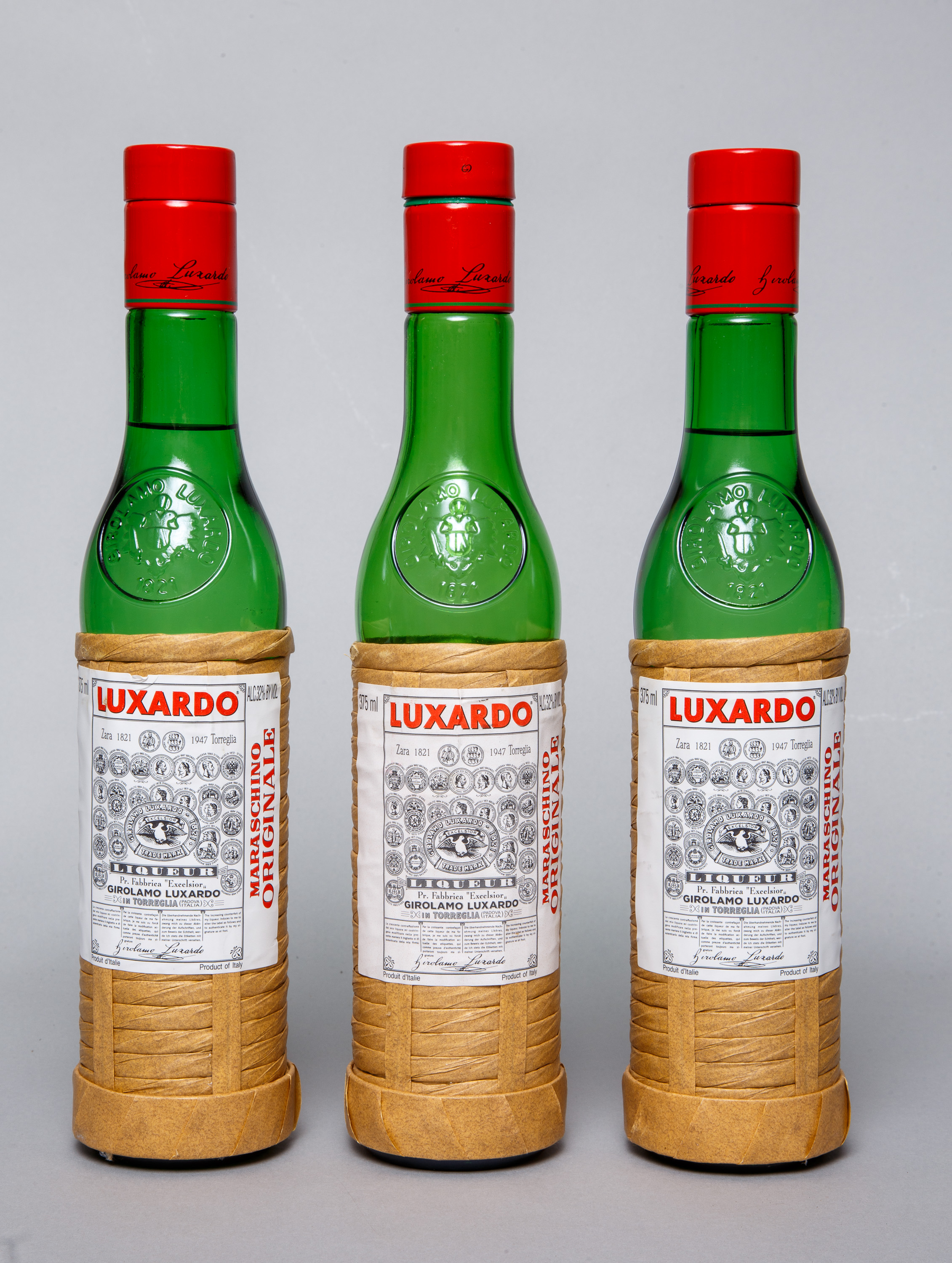
Girolamo Luxardo Maraschino Originale Liqueur

As the reputation of Maraschino grew, so did the name of Zara, which prompted other factories to emerge and become established, particularly those of Girolamo Luxardo (1821) and Romano Vlahov (1861). Together they formed l' industria del maraschino di Zara (the maraschino industry of Zadar) of which the acknowledged founder is Francesco Drioli.

The Second World War, the persecution of the Tito partisans against the Italian community (some of the Luxardo family, including Pietro and Nicolò Luxardo, were killed by partisans), the bombing of Zara and its transition to Yugoslav sovereignty, marked the end of an era. In the immediate post-war period the owners of the three most important distilleries, Vittorio Salghetti-Drioli, Giorgio Luxardo and Romano Vlahov, sought refuge in Italy and rebuilt their businesses in Mira, near Venice, Torreglia near Padua and Bologna respectively. By 1946 Vittorio had already resumed production and soon recaptured the company's traditional markets worldwide, in particular the English and English-speaking areas. He expertly reconciled his factory's long-standing and prestigious tradition with the demands for modernisation which such a radically altered post-war period called for. The death of Vittorio Salghetti-Drioli, sixth and last heir of the Dalmatian branch of the historic founding family of the maraschino industry of Zara, not only saw the extinction of this branch of the family, but also the end of the 200-year history of the Francesco Drioli factory, the oldest Italian liqueur company. After his death in 1974, his heirs set up Distillerie Venete Mira Spa (DI. VE. MI) with the Società Finanziaria Europea. The company was transferred to this new group while ownership of the factory, the brands, and the recipes was retained, and the use of the latter was authorised. In 1980 the Board of Directors decided to cease production and the company went into liquidation.

The valuable Salghetti-Drioli archive, which dates from the second half of the 18th century up to 1943, stands as testimony to the history of the maraschino of Zadar. The section preserved by the family in Vicenza was designated of "great historical interest" by the Ministry of Cultural Heritage in 1991, and has been catalogued by Prof. Georgetta Bonfiglio-Dosio. The section remaining in Zadar, which was confiscated after the war when the town passed to Yugoslavia, is preserved in the State Archives in Zadar (Drzavni Arhiv u Zadru) in the Tvornica F. Drioli Fund, and has been catalogued by the archivist Marijan Maroja. The archive as a whole not only documents the history of the factory, its development over seven generations of entrepreneurs and their considerable contribution to the history of Zadar, but lends an insight into historical events that shook the area around the Adriatic. The archive provides an unprecedented resource for historians and archivists from the fall of the Venetian Republic in 1797 up until the transition of Zadar to Yugoslav sovereignty in 1947, covering the various periods of Austrian, French and Italian domination. The maraschino industry had played a major role in the history of the city of Zadar and in the aftermath of the war, production activities were resumed. Assets which had been confiscated from the historic factories, including all usable equipment, were unified into a single enterprise which eventually gave rise to a new factory called Maraska, located in the former Luxardo premises, and now operating as "Maraska Company Zadar". This company has continued the traditional business, widening its range of liqueurs and syrups to become the most important liqueur producer in Croatia.

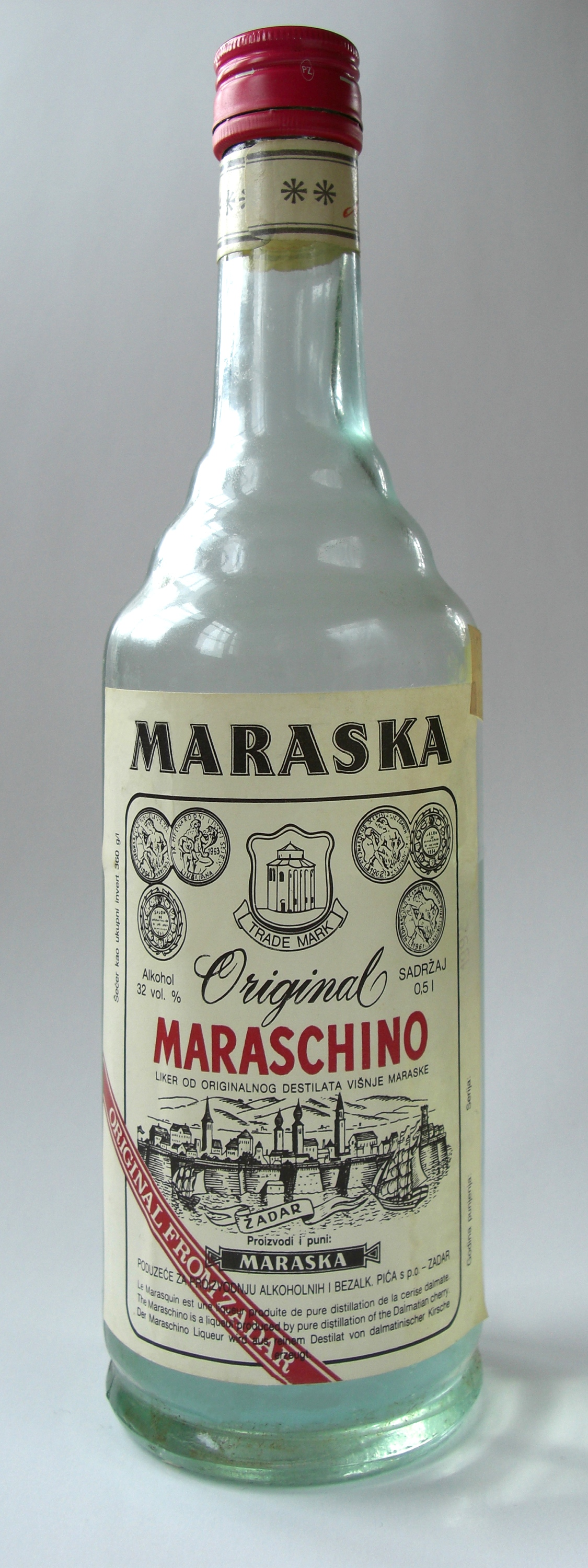
Maraska

== Historical brands in Zadar ==
- Maraschino Luxardo (1821)
- Distilleria Romano Vlahov (1861)
- Fabbrica Maraschino Francesco Drioli (1759–1943)
- Fabbrica Maraschino Stampalia
- Distilleria Bordiga (1888)
- Distilleria Calligarich
- Distilleria Millicich
- Distilleria Magazzin
- Distilleria Stanich
- Maraska d.d (consolidation - after Yugoslavian occupation - of the three most famous Zadar liqueur factories, “Excelsior Girolamo Luxardo”, “Romano Vlahov” and “Fabrica maraschino Francesco Drioli S.A.”, appeared in late December 1946 with a name “Maraska” factory of liqueurs, chocolate and candy Zadar.)

== Cocktails containing maraschino liqueur ==
Maraschino is a very special and notable ingredient in cocktails. Many recipes before prohibition called for Maraschino; it was one of the most used and most important ingredients. In the past few years, the growth of the craft cocktail movement has helped Maraschino regain its former status.

- Aviation
- Brandy crusta
- Brooklyn
- Casino
- Decepticon
- Demerara Dry Float
- Fancy free
- Hemingway special
- Illegal
- Improved whiskey cocktail
- Last Word
- Martinez
- Mary Pickford
- Red hook
- Tuxedo
- Takumi's aviation

== See also ==
- Luxardo
- Maraska
- Maraschino cherry
