= List of bartenders =

List of servers of alcoholic beverages

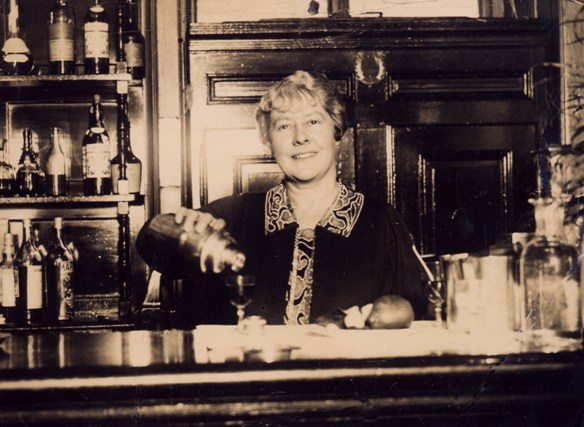
Ada Coleman bartending at the Savoy Hotel in London, c. 1920

This is a list of notable bartenders. A bartender (also known as a barkeep or a mixologist) is a person who serves alcoholic beverages and other drinks behind a bar, typically in a licensed establishment.

== Bartenders ==
=== A ===
- Tony Abou-Ganim
- Eric Alperin
- Douglas Ankrah

=== B ===
- Tiffanie Barriere
- Ayoub Bouteba (REDMEN) — 2024 USBG World Class Winner
- Dick Bradsell
- Aaron Buerge
- Julio Bermejo (originated the Tommy's Margarita)
- Jacques Bezuidenhout
- Damon Boelte
- Jacob Briars

=== C ===
- Salvatore Calabrese
- Erick Castro — Owner of Polite Provisions
- Toby Cecchini
- Cheryl Charming
- Stephen Cole
- Ada Coleman
- Wayne Collins
- Tim Costello
- Tony Conigliaro
- Harry Craddock

=== D ===
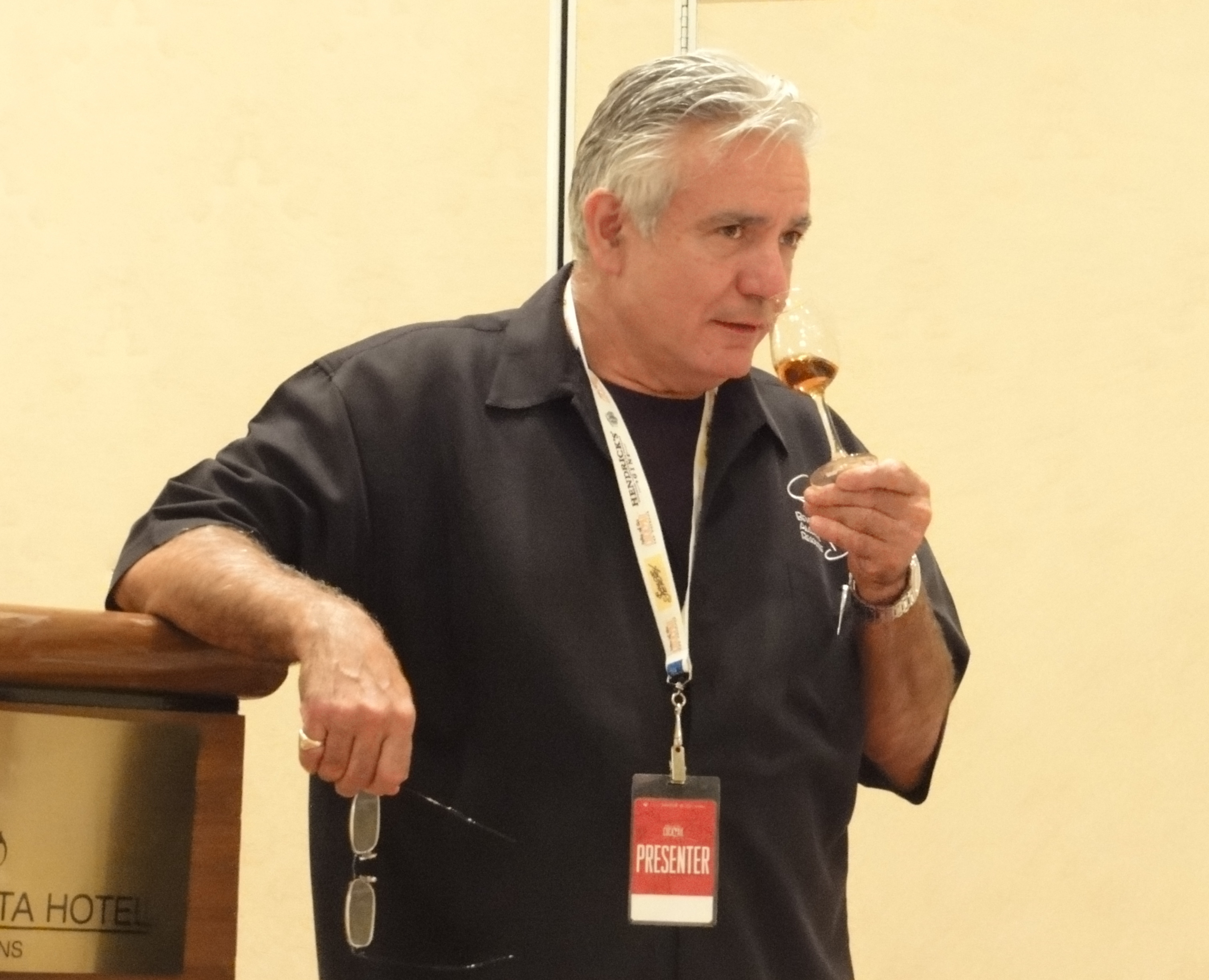
Dale DeGroff giving a presentation at "Tales of the Cocktail" in New Orleans

- Kyle Davidson
- Dale DeGroff
- Alex Day — Co-owner of Death & Co
- Marcovaldo Dionysos
- Meaghan Dorman

=== E ===
- Vincenzo Errico
- Kirk Estopinal

=== F ===
- Colin Peter Field

=== G ===
- Joe Gilmore
- Ricky Gomez — 2012 USBG World Class Winner
- Tonia Guffey

=== H ===
- Kenzo Han — 2025 Esquire’s Bartender of the Year
- Charles Hardwick
- Paul Harrington
- Benny Havens
- Sarah Ann Henley
- Robert Hess
- Jim Hewes
- Chris Hysted-Adams

=== I ===
- Mark Ibold
- Atilla Iskifoglu

=== J ===
- Harry Johnson
- Charles Joly — 2014 USBG World Class Winner

=== K ===
- Misty Kalkofen
- Juyoung Kang

=== L ===
- Nicole Lebedevitch
- Don Lee
- Greg Lindgren

=== M ===
- Harry MacElhone
- Toby Maloney — Owner of The Violet Hour
- Lynnette Marrero — Co-founder of Speed Rack
- Franky Marshall
- Michael McIlroy
- Chris McMillian
- Jim Meehan – Owner of PDT; author of The PDT Cocktail Book and Meehan's Bartender Guide
- Joerg Meyer
- Brian Miller
- Ivy Mix — Co-founder of Speed Rack
- Jeffrey Morgenthaler
- Victor Vaughn Morris
- Mike Mulderrig

=== O ===
- Lauren "LP" O'Brien — Drink Masters Season 1 Winner

=== P ===
- Maksym Pazuniak
- Fernand Petiot
- Sasha Petraske

=== R ===
- Gary Regan
- Julie Reiner
- Sam Ross

=== S ===
- Jon Santer
- Audrey Saunders
- Daniel Shoemaker
- TJ Siegal
- Maelcum Soul
- Tristan Stephenson
- Moe Szyslak
- Joaquin Simo
- Ezra Star
- Katie Stipe

=== T ===
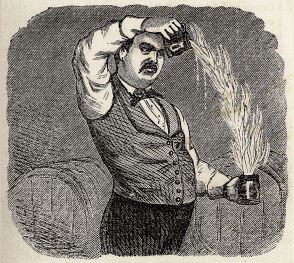
Jerry Thomas mixing his signature drink, The Blue Blazer

- Jon Taffer
- Jerry Thomas

=== U ===
- Kazuo Uyeda

=== V ===
- Brian Van Flandern
- Thad Vogler
- Charlotte Voisey

=== W ===
- Phil Ward
- Hoy Wong
- Takumi Watanabe

=== Z ===
- Daniel Zacharczuk

== See also ==
- Bar (establishment)
- List of public house topics
