= Craft cocktail movement =

Social movement

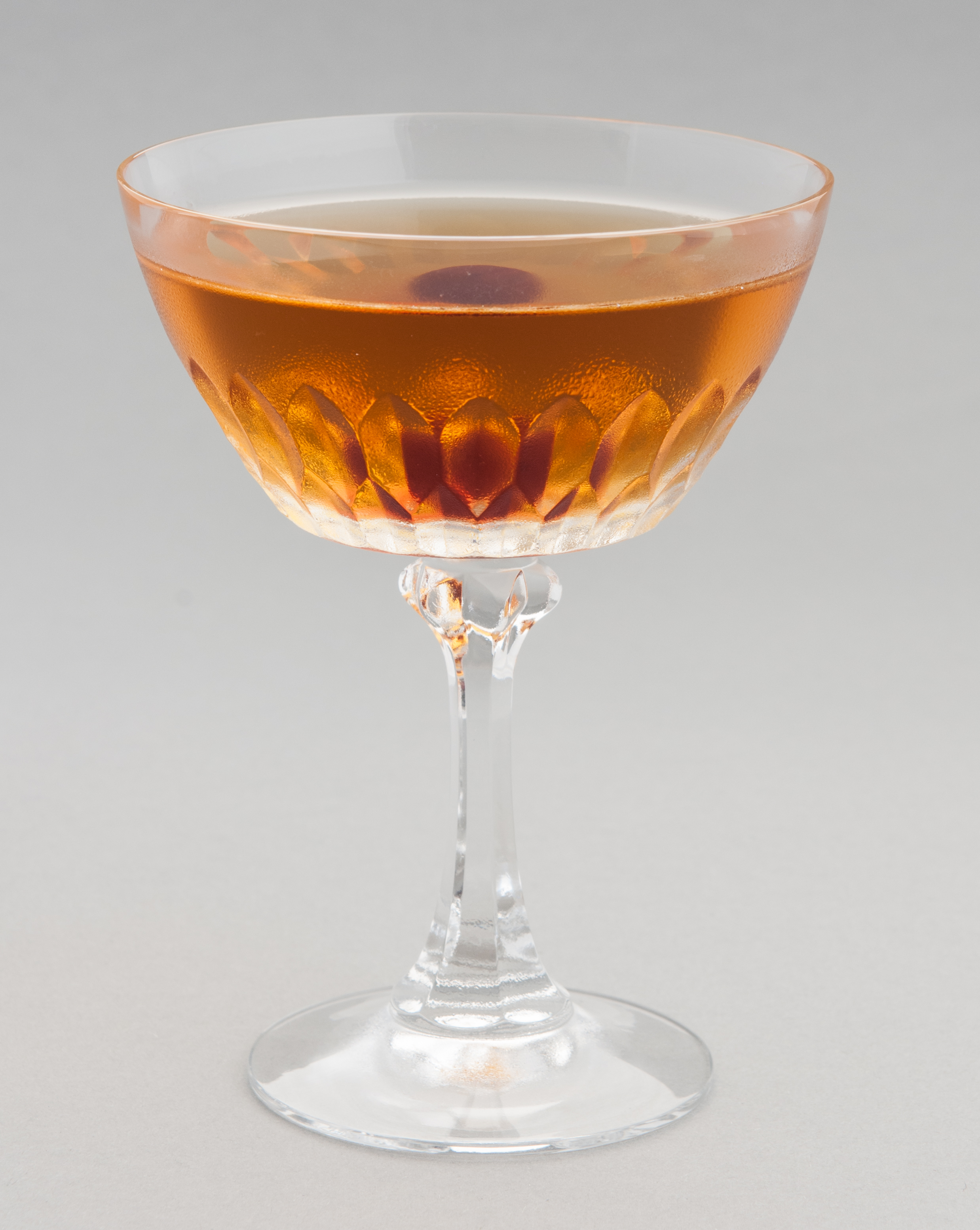
A Martinez, newly popular in the early years of the cocktail renaissance

The craft cocktail movement is a social movement spurred by the cocktail renaissance, a period of time in the late 20th and early 21st century characterized by a revival and re-prioritization of traditional recipes and methods in the bar industry, especially in the United States. The renaissance was followed by innovation and new techniques, and the movement has spread globally, now forming part of global cuisine.

The renaissance spanned from the late 1980s into the late 2010s, starting with isolated bars and bartenders in Manhattan, New York City, initially Dale DeGroff at the reopened Rainbow Room in 1987; see § History for more. A stricter range of the heyday is 2003 to 2017: 2003 saw the first craft cocktail conference, Tales of the Cocktail, while by 2017, high-quality ingredients, techniques, and liquors began to be ubiquitous in bars across the United States, leading writers to declare the renaissance over.

== History ==
The cocktail renaissance spanned from the early 2000s through 2017. It has no clear single origin, though it was largely influenced by three previous food-and-beverage movements: the Culinary Revolution of the 1970s and 1980s (a reaction to the processed foods of postwar America, which also influenced the wine and beer industries), the rise of the craft beer industry, and the rising popularity of the internet and social media. The movement took inspiration from the last golden age of cocktails.

Among the movement's early pioneers was bartender Dale DeGroff, who in the 1980s began popularizing classic cocktails and creating new ones with premium ingredients and fresh-squeezed juice (long out of fashion at the time). DeGroff was working at The Rainbow Room for Joe Baum, who himself had pioneered in the culinary world in the 1950s and 1960s with the Four Seasons and the Fonda del Sol. Baum told DeGroff to read Jerry Thomas's 1862 How to Mix Drinks, which had elements of bartending long forgotten in the U.S. by that time.

Another pioneer, Sasha Petraske, began visiting the New York City bar Angel's Share (opened 1993), ordering its classics and learning the precision involved in Japanese bartending before opening his own influential bar, Milk & Honey, in 1999.

Tales of the Cocktail, an annual industry event, was founded during the cocktail renaissance, in 2003. The event initially hoped to introduce cocktail book writers to their readers, though by 2017 it began to host about 20,000 attendees from across the world, and had its own international roadshow and membership program.

In the 2000s, proteges of Dale DeGroff and Sasha Petraske opened bars in New York City, and a parallel movement took place on the U.S. West Coast, especially around San Francisco. By 2010, the industry ballooned, helped by new trends in the restaurant industry. New cocktail bars could often be traced back in style or origin to New York or San Francisco.

Into the 2010s, bars across America began to diversify, attempting to stand out from the blueprint of the pioneering New York City cocktail bars. These diversified establishments included whiskey bars, gin bars, mezcal bars, tiki bars, bars focused on obscure drinks, and some focused on molecular gastronomy, notably including The Aviary in Chicago.

By the late 2010s, craft cocktails had become mainstream, changing the way nearly everybody drank at bars and at home. The number of microdistilleries and microbreweries reached a level not seen since before Prohibition. By 2017, bars across America offered negronis and daiquiris, made with competent techniques, fresh juices, homemade syrups, refrigerated vermouth, and high-quality spirits. "Craft cocktails" began being added into corporate restaurant chains menus, including Chili's, Denny's, and Ruby Tuesday. Focus in the bar world began to turn onto issues of equity, inclusion, sobriety, and work-life balance. During the COVID-19 pandemic, approximately 100,000 restaurants and bars permanently closed, which was also seen as part of an end to the cocktail renaissance.

== Characteristics ==
The craft cocktail movement is characterized by a return to traditions, a revival of old recipes, a reintroduction of forgotten spirits, and a revisiting of the culture of "sophisticated cocktail-sipping". A "craft cocktail" can be defined as a drink made from quality liquors consciously chosen by its creator, with fresh-squeezed juices and the like, and cold and dense ice. The term likely stems from the use of the term "craft beer", and from DeGroff's 2002 book The Craft of the Cocktail.

The movement involved the repopularization of Manhattans, old fashioneds, and hand-shaken daiquiris, displacing mudslides, Long Island iced teas, Midori sours, Appletinis and slushie-machine daiquiris, which had displaced those drinks many decades earlier. Some bartenders desired simply a return to traditional cocktails, though others advocated for extra creativity, a culinary element that moved the bartending world more than a simple era of nostalgia would have. The internet helped play a role in the creation of better cocktails; before the internet, bartenders would look up unfamiliar recipes in a printed bartender's guide, such as the Mr. Boston Official Bartender's Guide, and not know anything beyond that recipe. In the modern day, bartenders can find a plethora of recipes, the drink's history, who is known for drinking it, and other details. Bartenders' ability to share recipes and techniques allowed for a global conversation about bartending.

In the short term, the cocktail renaissance led to a greater number of bars and cocktail bar job creations, job security, and advancement. Over time, it increased investment throughout the bar and restaurant industry, revitalized the spirits industry, and increased tourism in the United States and throughout the world. The position of a bartender transformed from a blue collar job for those who could not handle office work, into a position of envy and prestige. Some of the senior bartenders became beverage managers, overseeing cocktail programs and creating detailed training programs to meet the higher standards of the clientele.

The movement has predominantly spread in large cities, though it has influenced small-town and even rural bars. The Oxford Companion to Spirits & Cocktails stated that once a customer has a well-made cocktail, it becomes hard to go backward.

Drinks to rise in popularity from the movement included Prohibition-era classics: bee's knees, last words, and negronis; pre-Prohibition drinks: Manhattans, old fashioneds, hand-shaken daiquiris, sazeracs, and clover clubs; as well as some newer drinks including Moscow mules. In contrast, the Ramos gin fizz had survived the "dark ages of mixology" as a decadent drink for Sunday brunches. Amid the cocktail renaissance, it became more important for bartenders to know how to make and the techniques involved in making them.

The movement also led to a revival of the speakeasy, through speakeasy-style bars. The trend was led by Angel's Share (opened 1993) and Milk & Honey (opened 1999), both in New York City. Other bars took on retro trends more successfully, without any secret doors, including the Flatiron Lounge (opened 2003) and the Pegu Club (opened 2005). Later notable speakeasies included Bourbon & Branch in San Francisco (opened 2006) and PDT (opened 2007). Also in 2007, Toby Maloney helped found the Violet Hour in Chicago. These bars taught its bartenders, who then spread the art of craft cocktails across America; the process also occurred around the world.

=== Cocktails ===
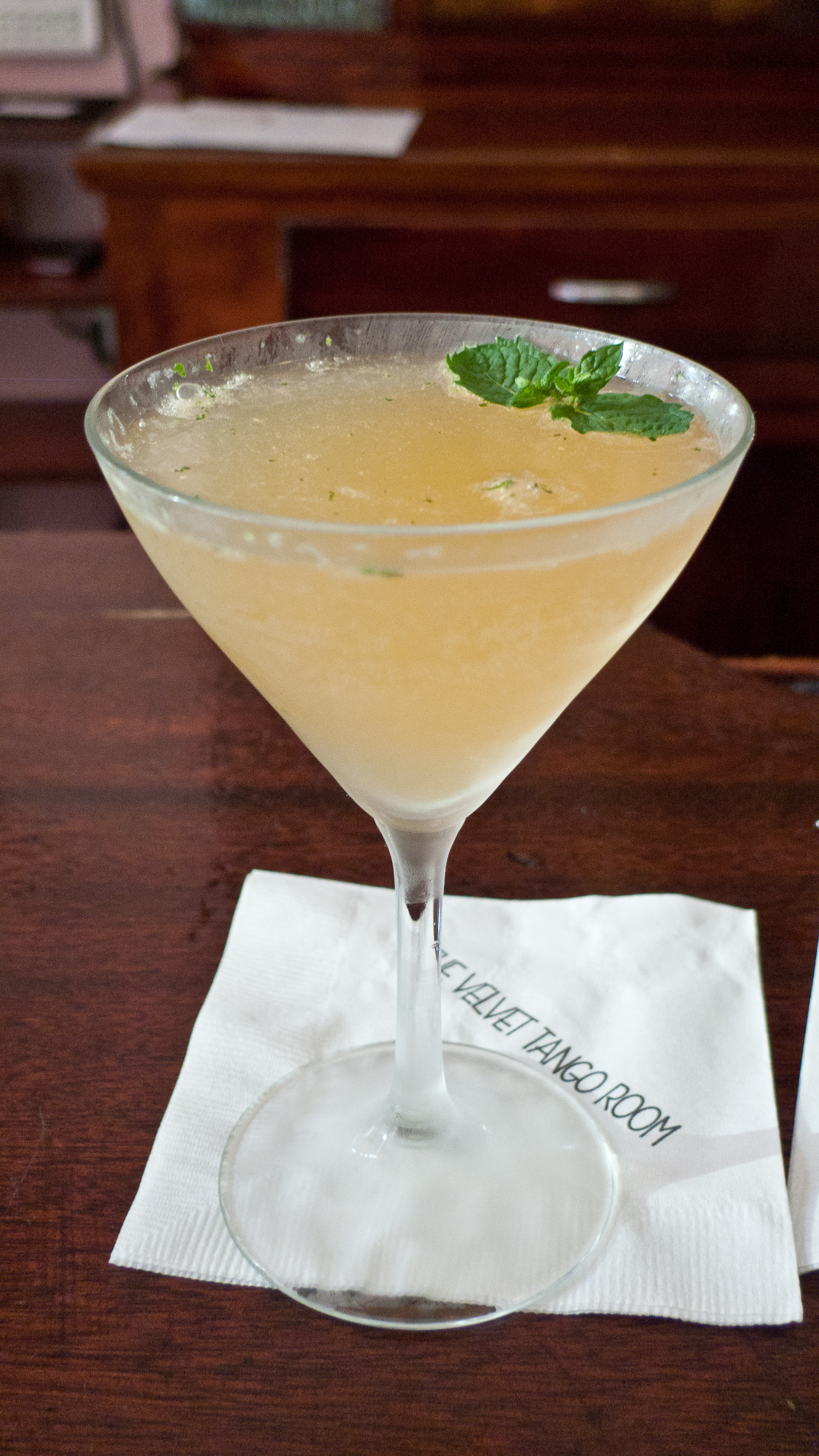
An Old Cuban cocktail, created by Audrey Saunders in 2001

Difford's Guide lists many cocktails as contemporary classics, cocktails created or popularized during the cocktail renaissance. These include:

- Amaretto sour (Jeffrey Morgenthaler recipe)
- Añejo highball
- Aperol spritz
- Barrel-aged negroni
- Benton's old fashioned
- Bramble
- Breakfast martini
- Chartreuse swizzle
- Corpse reviver number blue
- Cosmopolitan
- Earl Grey MarTEAni
- Eastside gimlet
- Espresso martini
- French martini
- Gin basil smash
- Gin gin mule
- Gold rush
- Green beast
- Jasmine
- Last Word
- Naked and Famous
- Negroni sbagliato
- Nuclear daiquiri
- Oaxaca old fashioned
- Old Cuban
- Paloma
- Paper plane
- Penicillin
- Porn star martini
- Red hook
- Rum old-fashioned
- Russian spring punch
- Sour apple martini
- Tantris sidecar
- Tommy's margarita
- Trident
- Trinidad sour
- Watermelon martini
- Whisky smash
- White negroni

Some of these drinks were early to the cocktail renaissance and may seem simple or dated by modern standards. The breakfast martini and porn star martini are among them; they capitalized on the name-recognition of fruity "-tini" drinks, though the breakfast martini was one of the first cocktails to use jam as an ingredient, and the porn star martini gains body and flavor from passionfruit purée.

=== Distilling ===
The movement led to more craft distilling and distribution. As classic cocktails called for ingredients that were not distributed in certain areas (American rye was hard to find in Europe, like crème de violette was not available in the United States), some ingredients were no longer in production, e.g. Old Tom gin hadn't been made since World War II. Craft distilleries began to open worldwide, reversing the 20th-century consolidation of the industry and its product ranges. Operational distilleries rose from 24 in the United States in 2000 to more than 200 by 2010, which rose to over 2,000 by 2020.

Spirits companies began to hire brand ambassadors, traveling from bar to bar, or sometimes globally, to convince bars and patrons to feature their brands in cocktails.

== Notable bars and bartenders ==
=== Bars ===
Notable bars that led the movement have included:

- Absinthe, San Francisco
- Angel's Share, New York City
- Clyde Common, Portland, Oregon
- Death & Co., New York City
- Drink, Boston
- Employees Only, New York City
- Flatiron Lounge, New York City
- Milk & Honey, New York City
- Pegu Club, New York City
- Rickhouse, San Francisco
- Seven Grand, Los Angeles
- Smuggler's Cove, San Francisco
- The Violet Hour, Chicago
- Zig Zag Café, Seattle

=== Bartenders ===
Notable bartenders involved in leading the cocktail renaissance have included:

- Audrey Saunders
- Dale DeGroff
- Dominic Venegas
- Duggan McDonnell
- Dushan Zaric
- Jim Meehan
- Julie Reiner
- Julio Bermejo
- Marco Dionysos
- Martin Cate
- Murray Stenson
- Paul Harrington
- Sasha Petraske
- Scott Beattie
- Thad Vogler
- Toby Maloney
