= Angel's Share =

Defunct cocktail bar in New York City

- Interactive map of Angel's Share

Restaurant information
- Established: 1993
- Owner: Erina Yoshida
- Previous owner: Tadao "Tony" Yoshida
- Location: 45 Grove St., Manhattan, New York City, New York City
- Coordinates: 40.729766°N 73.989161°W
- Reservations: Walk-ins only, no reservations taken
- Website: www.angelssharenyc.com

Angel's Share is a speakeasy-style bar originally located in the East Village of Manhattan, New York City. The Japanese-style bar was one of the pioneering establishments in the cocktail renaissance.

The bar had an outsized influence on the craft cocktail movement, and was among several Japanese-owned businesses on a section of Stuyvesant Street, developed by Tadao "Tony" Yoshida. The bar directly influenced Sasha Petraske, who founded Milk & Honey, which inspired bars around the world.

The upscale craft cocktail bar had a "romantic room" and a view of Stuyvesant Triangle. It opened in 1993. The bar utilized elements of Japanese bartending, including measuring, stirring, and shaking drinks with precision: something still practiced in Japan while the U.S. was in a "dark age" in the bar industry.

Pioneering bartender Sasha Petraske began visiting Angel's Share in the 1990s, ordering its classics and learning the precision involved in Japanese bartending before opening his own influential bar, Milk & Honey, in 1999.

The bar became immensely popular by around 2015, with long lines and waits of up to an hour, taking away from its element of secrecy. The bar's owners decided to open another speakeasy, sometimes referred to as an annex of Angel's Share, above Sharaku, a restaurant owned by Yoshida. The bar was oriented more toward classic cocktails, allowing its bartenders to moreso highlight classic Japanese bartending techniques and one of the bar's cocktails, the Flirtibird, is credited with having introduced shochu cocktails to New York City.

The bar operated for nearly 30 years in its location in the East Village. It faced eviction as reported in mid-March 2022; an old lease agreement ended and a massive rent hike would have taken place. The bar's last day was March 31, 2022, involving a line stretching down the block until last call. Later in 2022, the bar reopened as a summer pop-up in the Hotel Eventi in Midtown. The pop-up was also hidden; had nearly all the same staff, some of the old tables and chairs, and some of the original cocktails. The hotel planned to eventually open its own speakeasy in the space, and the bar's new owner, Erina Yoshida (daughter of original owner, "Tony Yoshida,") planned to reopen Angel's Share in a permanent location.

In March 2023, it was announced that the bar would reopen--under Erina Yoshida--at 45 Grove Street in West Village. Yoshida stated, “I was really about to give up when I found this space... it had this old world charm and a history, which was very important to me, knowing that we’ve been around for a long time, too.”

The 65-seat Grove Street location opened on June 14, 2023, bringing back the original angel mural from the East Village bar. In addition to the mural, the new location also boasts the door and antique chandelier from that location. After reopening, Angel's Share was listed as one of the top 50 bars in North America both in 2024 and 2025.
