= Naked and Famous =

Naked and Famous may refer to:

- "Naked and Famous" (song), by The Presidents of the United States of America (1994)
- Naked and famous (cocktail), IBA official cocktail
- The Naked and Famous, indie rock band
- Naked & Famous (brand), Canadian denim brand

== See also ==
- Half Naked & Almost Famous, 2012 EP by Machine Gun Kelly
