= Eryn Reece =

American bartender

- Born: Portland, Oregon, U.S.
- Occupation: Bartender
- Awards: Speed Rack National Champion; 2013

Eryn Reece is an American bartender. She is the bar director for Banzabar and Freemans Restaurant, both in New York City. In 2013, Reece was named Speed Rack National Champion. In 2014, The Daily Meal named her one of the top 25 bartenders in the United States. Reece has been profiled in, and her work featured in, PUNCH, The Daily Beast, Maxim, WPIX, The Spirits Business, Thrillist, and other media outlets.

== Early life and education ==
Eryn Reece was born in Portland, Oregon. She waitressed when she was a teenager. When she turned 21, she started bartending at Mona's Bistro in Seattle, Washington. She moved to New York City in 2007 to intern at an art gallery as part of her undergraduate studies.

== Career ==
In New York City, Reece first bartended at MercBar, followed by Bar Milano. In a 2013 interview, Reece called her time at Bar Milano as "the most eye-opening experience of my life," after working with Tony Abou-Ganim. She also worked at Louis 649, The Hideout, Dressler, Rye House, Mayahuel and Death & Co. In 2013, Reece was named Speed Rack National Champion. The following year, The Daily Meal named her one of the top 25 best bartenders in the United States. As of 2019, she serves as bar director at Banzabar and Freemans Restaurant, both on the Lower East Side. At Banzabar, Reece prepares low alcohol cocktails to be paired with a tasting menu by chef Humberto Guallpa, as well as serving an à la carte menu featuring beverages of various alcohol levels.

=== Style, cocktails and influences ===
One of Reece's signature drinks at Banzabar is Shackleton's Urn. The cocktail was inspired by the Cobra's Fang cocktail. It comprises two types of gin, rum, lime, passionfruit, ginger, cinnamon, and peach. It is served on crushed ice in an urn-shaped container with a lime lit on fire. The container was created specifically for the glass by a company in Portland, Oregon.

Reece refers to Flavor Bible by Karen A. Page and Andrew Dornenburg when creating new cocktails. In PUNCH, Reece shared that Tyson Buhler's rye whiskey cocktail, the Warrior Poet, was one of the best drinks she had ever had. The worst drink she has ever had is Amaro Sibilla. Her favorite bar is Good Night Sonny and her "go-to" drink at a cocktail bar is a Daiquiri. In 2013, she named Joaquin Simo one of her favorite bartenders.

== Personal life ==
Reece lives in Manhattan.
