= Conigliaro =

Conigliaro is an Italian surname. Notable people with the surname include:

- Billy Conigliaro (1947–2021), American baseball outfielder
- Marcos Conigliaro (1942–2026), Argentine football coach and former player
- Tony Conigliaro (1945–1990), American baseball right fielder, brother of Billy
- Tony Conigliaro (mixologist), British bartender and mixologist
