= Eryn =

Eryn is a given name. Notable people with the name include:

- Eryn Bulmer (born 1976), female diver and gold medallist from Canada
- Eryn Cayetano (born 2001), American tennis player
- Eryn Green, American poet, winner of the Yale Series of Younger Poets Competition
- Eryn Allen Kane, American rhythm and blues musician from Detroit, Michigan
- Eryn Krueger Mekash, American make-up artist, producer and special effects artist
- Eryn Reece, American bartender, bar director for Banzabar and Freemans Restaurant in New York City
- Eryn Shewell (born 1984), American jazz and blues guitarist and vocalist from Jackson, New Jersey

== See also ==
- Eryn also means "forest" in the fictional language Sindarin devised by J. R. R. Tolkien, giving rise to:
  - Eryn Lasgalen, renaming of the fictional forest "Mirkwood" in J. R. R. Tolkien's Middle Earth after its cleansing by Galadriel
  - Eryn Vorn, fictional ancient woodland in J. R. R. Tolkien's Middle Earth
