= The Golden Tiki =

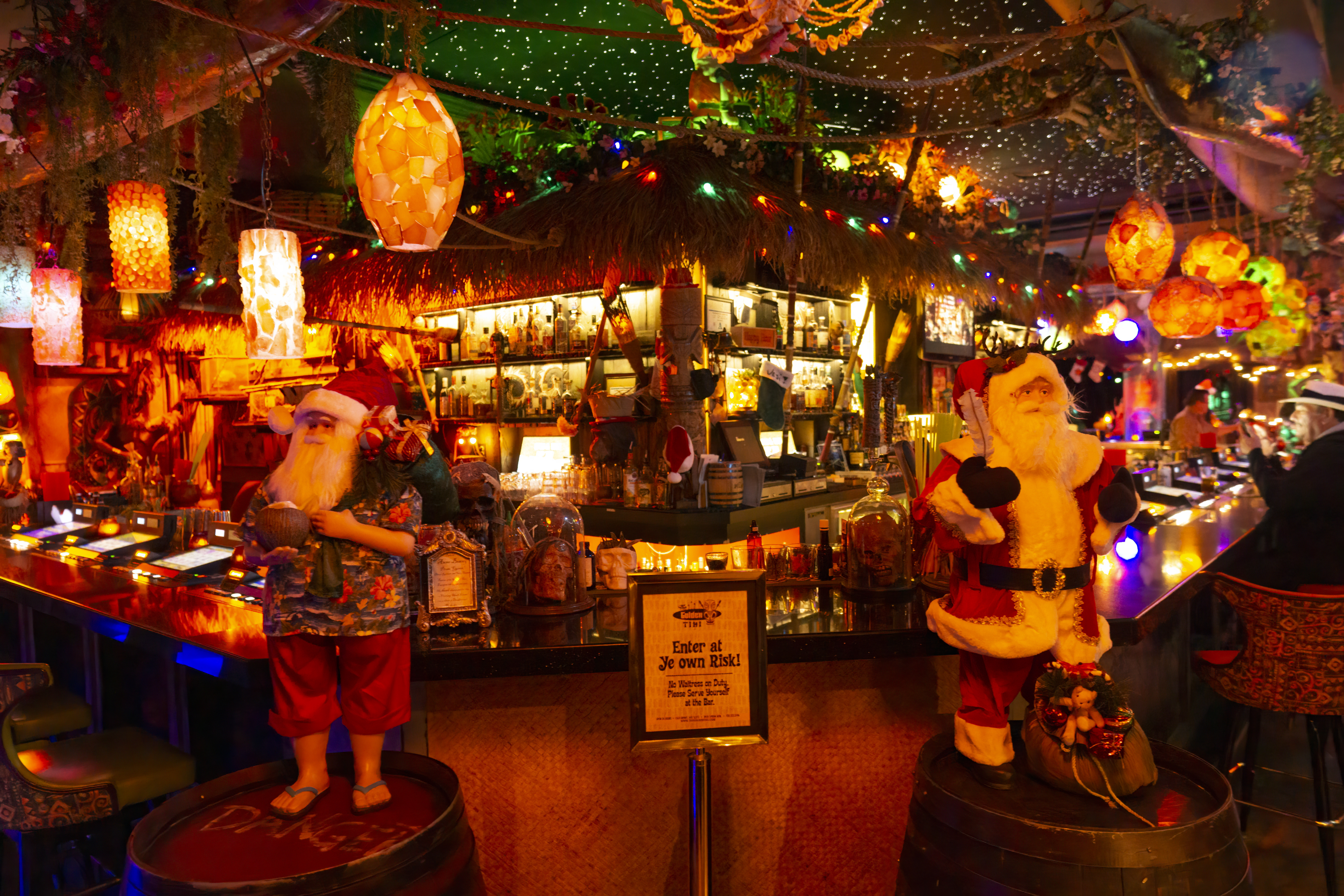
- Interior of the Golden Tiki in 2019

Restaurant information
- Established: 2015
- Owner: Lev Food Group
- Manager: Nick Brink
- Location: 3939 Spring Mountain Rd, Las Vegas, Clark, Nevada, 89102, United States
- Website: www.thegoldentiki.com

The Golden Tiki is a tiki bar located on Spring Mountain Road in Las Vegas, Nevada. It was opened for business in 2015 by Lev Food Group.

== World's largest Mai Tai ==
On August 30, 2022, Adam Rains and The Golden Tiki produced a 100-gallon Mai Tai consisting of 300 bottles of liquor, the largest ever made.

== Reception ==
In her writeup of the best nightlife in Las Vegas, USA Today's Terrisa Meeks recommended The Golden Tiki because "A night at the Golden Tiki will transport you to a tropical paradise, complete with strong drinks, music and plenty of kitsch."

In their list of best cocktail bars in Las Vegas, Thrillist writers Rob Kachelriess, and Nicole Rupersburg called the decor "over the top kitschy" and the bar as having an "inspired" craft cocktail menu.
