= Charlotte Voisey =

English bartender and mixologist

Charlotte Voisey is an English bartender and mixologist.

== Early life ==
Voisey is from London.

== Career ==
Voisey worked in restaurant management and as a bartender in London, Barcelona, Buenos Aires and New York and opened Apartment 195 in London in 2002. She has worked as a cocktail consultant for multiple restaurants.

In the mid-2010s Voisey became a portfolio ambassador for William Grant & Sons, a Scottish distiller of spirits. She eventually became director of brand advocacy and as of 2024 was global head of ambassadors for the firm.

== Recognition ==
Voisey was named UK bartender of the year in 2004. In 2011 she was named Wine Enthusiast's inaugural Mixologist of the Year.

The Hot Charlotte, a gin, St-Germain, and lemon juice cocktail flavored with cucumber and garnished with Tabasco and cucumber, was named after her by its creator, Seattle mixologist Murray Stenson.

== Personal life ==
As of 2022 Voisey lived in Williamsburg, Brooklyn.

== See also ==
- List of bartenders
