= The Museum of the American Cocktail =

Museum

The Museum of the American Cocktail, based in New Orleans, Louisiana, is a nonprofit organization dedicated to education in mixology and preserving the rich history of the cocktail as developed in the United States. Among its events are tastings in association with specific seminars or exhibits. It annually presents the American Cocktail Awards (the "Olives"), together with the United States Bartenders Guild.

== Overview ==
The Museum of the American Cocktail was founded in October 2004 by Dale and Jill DeGroff, Robert Hess, Philip Greene, Ted Haigh, Anistatia Miller, Jared Brown, Chris McMillian, Laura McMillian, and a group of spirits experts, writers, and cocktail historians including David Wondrich, drink correspondent for Esquire; and Gaz Regan, among others. The Museum provides education in mixology through its exhibits, monthly seminars, publications, and events.

Visitors experience the history of the cocktail and the way it has influenced music, theater, art, film, and politics around the world during its two-hundred-year history. The exhibit includes antique and vintage cocktail shakers, Prohibition-era literature, recorded music, bar tools, photographs, and cocktail memorabilia from the collections of the Museum's friends and founders.

The Museum of the American Cocktail publishes a website, a monthly newsletter, and an annual journal titled Mixologist. In May 2006, the Museum published The Museum of the American Cocktail Pocket Recipe Guide, a pocket-sized book of cocktail tips, techniques and 100 classic recipes, including by Jerry Thomas of mid-19th century New York, considered the "father of American mixology."

== Return to New Orleans ==
The Museum returned to New Orleans in July 2008. It moved to the Southern Food and Beverage Museum in 2014, which is located in the former Dryades Street Market at 1504 Oretha Castle Haley Boulevard.

The Museum of the American Cocktail showcases a collection of rare spirits and books, including Prohibition-era literature. It features examples of the cocktail's influence on broader historical trends and its place in social history. The museum has featured tastings associated with specific events and seminars. Though it is not operated as a bar, the museum facility is connected to a bar and restaurant demonstrating many classic cocktails.

== The Olives ==
The Museum of the American Cocktail annually presents the American Cocktail Awards (the "Olives"), in association with the United States Bartenders Guild. Awards are given to establishments and individuals for individual pre-dinner cocktail recipes and execution, and overall cocktail list development.

== See also ==
- List of food and beverage museums
