= Brian Van Flandern =

American mixologist (born 1968)

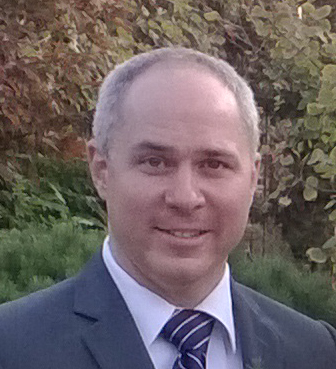
- Van Flandern in 2014
- Born: Brian Daniel Van Flandern; May 5, 1968 (age 58); Fairfax, Virginia, U.S.
- Education: State University of New York
- Occupations: Mixologist, author
- Writing career
- Period: 2009–present
- Genres: Cookbooks, Food & Wine
- Notable works: Vintage Cocktails (2009); Craft Cocktails (2013); Celebrity Cocktails (2014); Tequila Cocktails (2016)
- Website: www.mymixologist.com

Brian Van Flandern (born May 5, 1968) is an American mixologist, spirits historian, and award-winning cocktail book author. He has been called "America's Top Mixologist" by Food Network. His book, Vintage Cocktails, won the Gourmand World Cookbook Awards|Gourmand World Cookbook Award for best Cocktail book in the World 2009.

Van Flandern has cocktails served in over forty countries throughout the world and he has created original recipes and cocktail programs for famed chefs: Michel Richard, Thomas Keller, Geoffrey Zakarian and others.

== History ==
Van Flandern was raised in Washington, D.C. but moved to New York in 1990 to pursue an acting career at the National Shakespeare Conservatory. He bartended as a side job where he worked at such restaurants as Esca and Ilo until given the opportunity to open chef Thomas Keller's restaurant, Per Se.

== Bibliography ==
| Year | Title | Award | Outcome | Notes |
|---|---|---|---|---|
| 2009 | Vintage Cocktails | Gourmand World Cookbook | Winner - 1st place | |
| 2013 | Craft Cocktails | Tales of the Cocktail | Nominated | |
| 2014 | Celebrity Cocktails | | | |
| 2016 | Tequila Cocktails | | | |

== See also ==
- List of bartenders
