= Ivy Mix =

American bartender

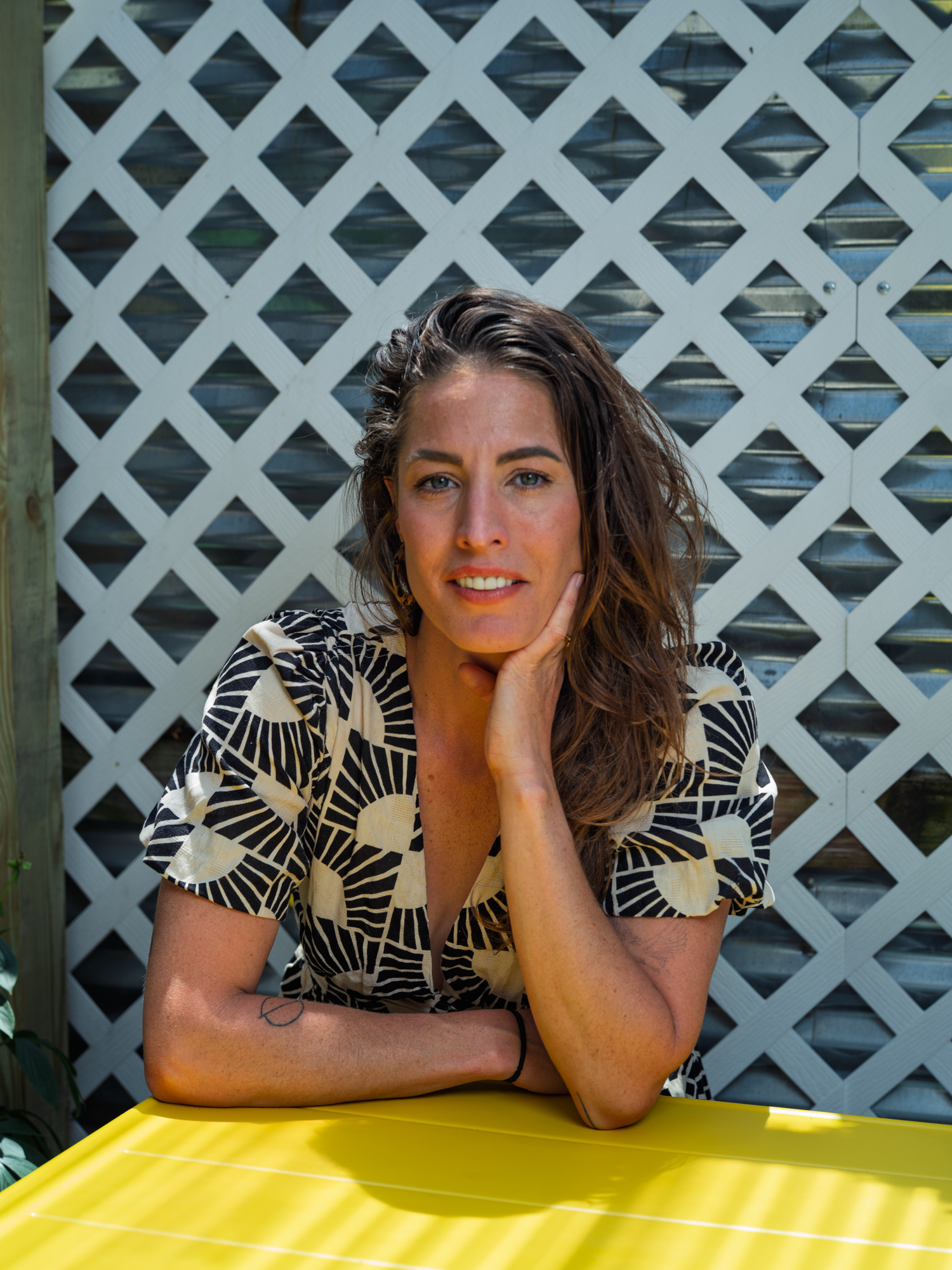
- Born: c. 1985 (age 40–41)
- Occupation: Bartender
- Known for: Popularizing mezcal in the United States; Co-founding Speed Rack

Ivy Mix (born c. 1985) is an American bartender. She was head bartender and co-owner of the James Beard Award-nominated bar Leyenda in Brooklyn, New York, which closed in 2025. Currently, she is co-owner of Whoopsie Daisy wine bar in the Crown Heights neighborhood of Brooklyn, New York. She co-founded Speed Rack alongside Lynnette Marrero. Mix was named Best American Bartender of the Year at Tales of the Cocktail in 2015.

== Early life and education ==
Ivy Mix grew up in Tunbridge, Vermont. Her parents are artists. She has an identical twin sister, Tess. As a child, Mix rode horses. She wanted to be an Olympic horseback rider when she grew up. In high school, she played lacrosse and soccer. She studied art at Bennington College.

When Mix was nineteen, she was visiting Antigua Guatemala. She visited Café No Sé, where she tasted mezcal for the first time. She credits Café No Sé as introducing her to bar culture and bartending. At the bar, drinks were served on an honor system, and Mix found herself indebted to the bar. She paid off her tab bartending. She began smuggling mezcal over the border from Mexico into Guatemala.

== Career ==
In 2008, Mix left Guatemala and moved to New York City to pursue a career in the arts. She worked at Gagosian Gallery. She despised the job, calling it the worst job she ever had. She wasn't skilled at crafting cocktails, despite her knowledge of mezcal. She applied for a bartending job at Mayahuel and was turned down, only to be hired as a cocktail waitress. She gained bartending skills at Mayahuel and also at Fort Defiance. During this time, Mix noticed the majority of her colleagues were men, especially in the budding speakeasy throwback culture. This inspired her to co-found Speed Rack with fellow bartender Lynnette Marrero, giving female bartenders a space to be showcased while raising money for breast cancer.

Mix began working for Julie Reiner, at Reiner's bars Lani Kai and Clover Club. Mix expressed to Reiner that she wanted to open a bar serving mezcal and Latin food. Reiner decided to invest in the bar and in 2015, Mix opened Leyenda in Brooklyn. In 2019, Leyenda was nominated for a James Beard Award for outstanding bar program. In 2024, she opened Whoopsie Daisy wine bar in Brooklyn. In 2026, Mix was a James Beard Award nominee for Outstanding Professional in Cocktail Service.

=== Style, cocktails and influences ===
Mix's style is heavily influenced by her time in Latin America and the vibrant, colorful cocktails of tiki culture. One of Mix's signature cocktails is the Tia Mia, which she created when working at Lani Kai. It is a variation on a Mai Tai containing mezcal, Jamaican rum, orgeat, lime, and curaçao. The Tia Mia is inspired by a woman she knew in Guatemala.

Two of Mix's favorite cocktail-oriented books are Flavor Bible and Flavor Thesaurus. One of her favorite cocktails is the Irish Coffee at Fort Defiance in Red Hook, New York. Mix enjoys drinking sherry, wine and Negronis.

== Personal life ==
Mix lives in the Crown Heights neighborhood of Brooklyn.
