= Southern Food and Beverage Museum =

Museum in New Orleans, Louisiana, U.S.

The Southern Food & Beverage Museum
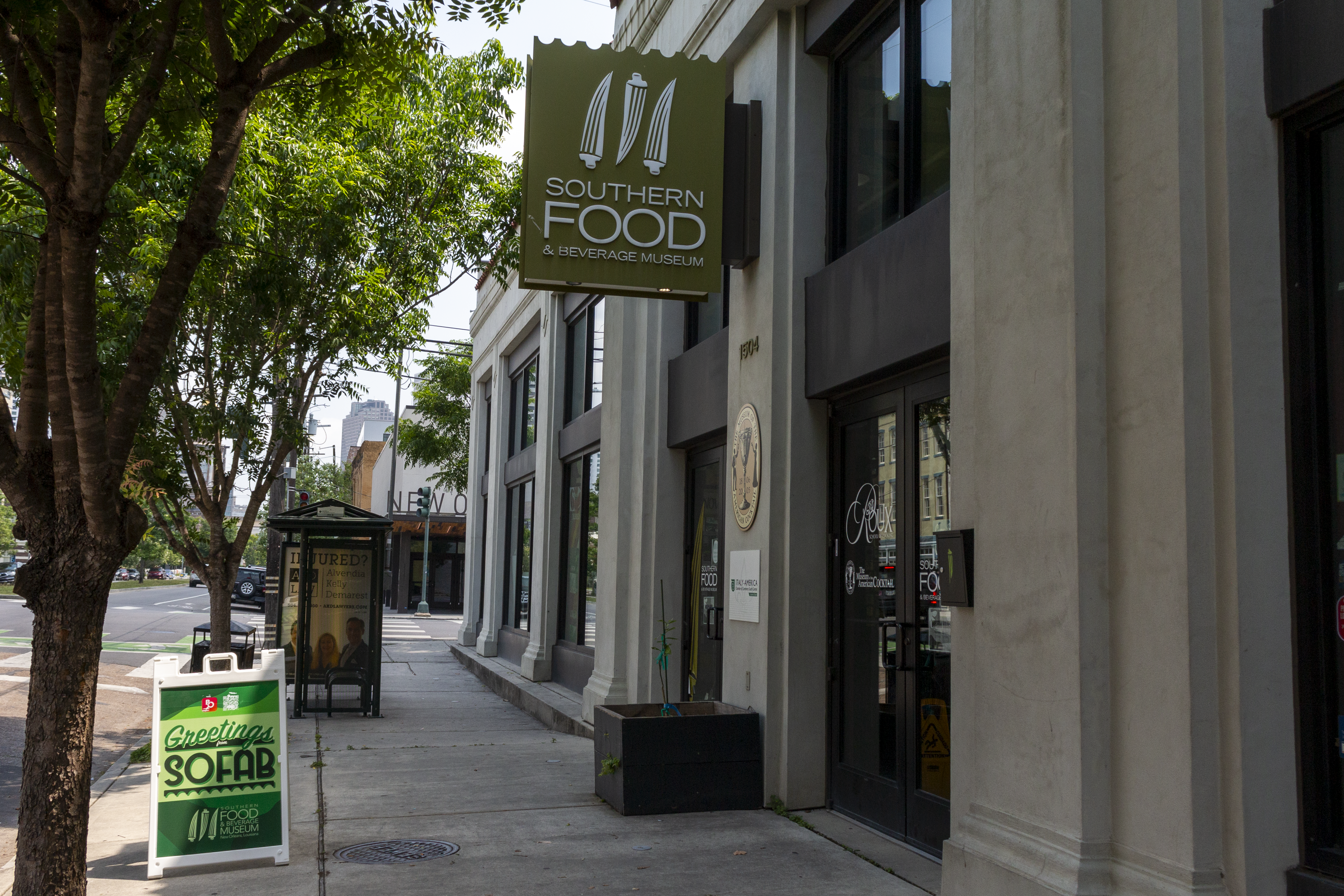
- Front entrance of the museum
- Established: 2004
- Location: 1504 Oretha Castle Haley Blvd, New Orleans, Louisiana, USA 70113
- Coordinates: 29°56′27″N 90°4′45″W
- Type: Food museum
- Website: www.southernfood.org

The Southern Food & Beverage Museum was a non-profit museum based in New Orleans, Louisiana, with a mission to explore the culinary history of the American Southern states and to explain the roots of Southern food and drinks. Their exhibits focused on every aspect of food in the South, from the cultural traditions to the basic recipes and communities formed through food. The museum was located on the corner of O.C. Haley Boulevard and Martin Luther King Jr Boulevard in Central City, New Orleans.

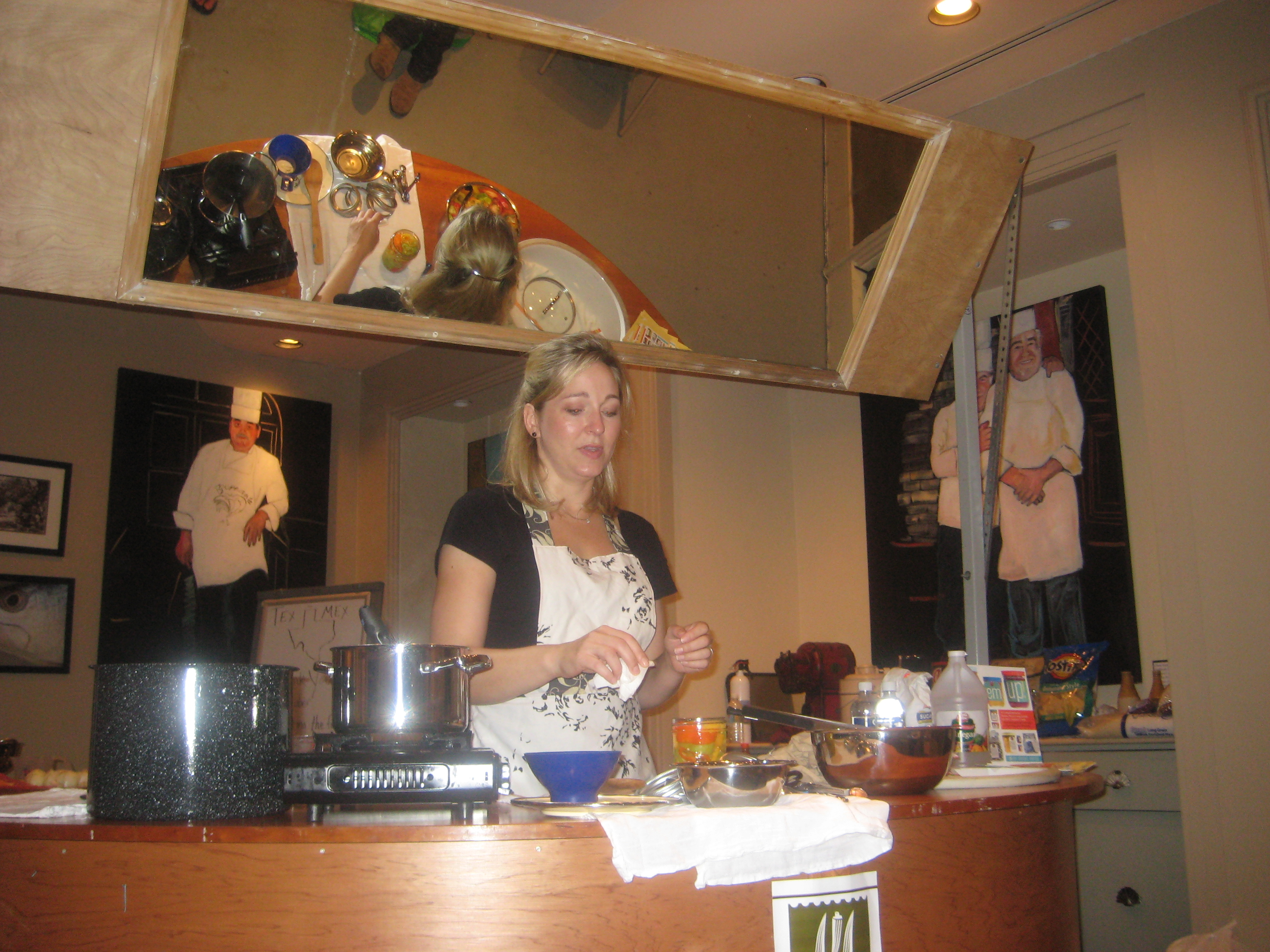
Canning demonstration at the Southern Food & Beverage Museum in 2010

== History ==
The Museum was founded in 2004 by Matt Konigsmark, Gina Warner, and Elizabeth Williams, who was the former President and is now the founder. As of 2011, the current President and CEO was Constance Jackson. The museum got its start through a small exhibit on the history and influences of beverages in New Orleans. With help from co-founders Elizabeth Pearce and a growing board of interested foodies from around the South, the exhibits grew. Pearce curated an exhibit based on the revival of restaurants in post-Hurricane Katrina New Orleans called Restaurant Restorative that was featured at the 2006 James Beard Foundation Awards. From there, it was only a matter of finding the proper space for a full-sized museum on food and beverages that would cover the entire South, not just New Orleans and Louisiana. In the summer of 2008, the Museum finally found a home in Riverwalk Marketplace, a shopping mall right on the Mississippi River in the Warehouse District of New Orleans.

On September 1, 2011, the Southern Food & Beverage Museum announced it was relocating to a larger space on O. C. Haley Boulevard in historic Central City, New Orleans. The groundbreaking at Dryades Market building happened on June 25, 2012. The new facility opened on September 29, 2014. The location included a culinary innovation center, an exhibit for every southern state, a Gumbo Garden, a Culinary Heritage Sign Gallery, the Museum of the American Cocktail, an absinthe gallery, and a temporary exhibit space.

In May 2011, Southern Food & Beverage Museum was named one of the five great museums devoted to food by Saveur magazine.

In September 2026, the museum announced it was ceasing operations after incurring $5 million in debt. A spokesperson stated the museum was unable to overcome financial obstacles created by the pandemic and hurricanes. Many of the artifacts from the museum's exhibits were auctioned off in an estate sale.

== Exhibits and programs ==
The Southern Food & Beverage Museum featured a wide range of food and beverage related exhibits.

The Leah Chase Louisiana Gallery was a permanent gallery focused on the food and traditions of Louisiana. The gallery is named after New Orleans creole chef Leah Chase. Louisiana Eats! Laissez Faire – Savoir Fare, as the exhibit is called, covered everything from beignets to harvesting crawfish, to the evolution of jambalaya through colonial and native foods.

Bruning's Bar is a bar dating back from 1859 that was fully restored. It was salvaged from the wreckage of Bruning's, the third oldest restaurant in New Orleans, after Hurricane Katrina. The bar was also used as such during special events.

As part of the Paul McIlhenny Culinary Entrepreneurship Program, SoFAB had a partnership with Deelightful Roux School of Cooking. The school was located inside the museum.

== Events ==
The Southern Food & Beverage Museum usually hosted events on weekends. The events range from cooking demonstrations to workshops on beer making or rum tasting.

The Museum also hosted children's culinary camps that teach kids how to cook and appreciate food. There were also lesson plans available for teachers to teach history and culture through a culinary approach.

== Publications ==
Red Beans and Ricely Yours: The Museum reprinted Christopher Blake's 1982 cookbook in both 2005 and 2006. It is a collection of traditional recipes from New Orleans, beginning with Louis Armstrong's favorite, the classic red beans and rice.

On the Line is SoFab's online blog, with recipes and features by multiple contributors, all experts on food and food ways of the South. Liz Williams, museum director, writes the Bread and Butter feature, which focuses on her expertise in food law.

The Southern Food & Beverage Museum Cookbook, available in June 2024, shares recipes related to each state in the American South. It is also known as the SoFAB Cookbook.

Nitty Grits is a podcast network that hosts a variety of audio and visual podcasts dedicated to all aspects of food and drink across New Orleans and the world. The podcast is released monthly. Links to the podcasts can be found through the museum's website.

The National Culinary Heritage Register is a list of culinary commodities, processes, inventions, traditions, and establishments that are at least fifty years old and have contributed significantly to the development of American foodways. It is the first and only register of its kind, meant to preserve the complex history of food and beverage in America.

== Related institutions ==
The Museum of the American Cocktail was housed in the Southern Food & Beverage Museum. It chronicled the extensive history of the cocktail in America and da wealth of information regarding the social and cultural impact of alcoholic beverages.

In late October 2013, SoFAB opened a culinary library on O.C. Haley Boulevard. Currently, the library and archive, known collectively as the SoFAB Research Center, are located at Nunez Community College in Chalmette, Louisiana. This research library was open to the public and houses over 40,000 volumes including cookbooks, magazines, and books about food history, food politics, nutrition, agriculture, and other culinary topics.

It was also home to a growing archival collection. The archive was a resource for scholars examining the culture of food and drink and the role of food and beverages in cultural history. The library and archive contained information about food from all over the world, not limited to the American South.
