= Milk & Honey (bar) =

- Interactive map of Milk & Honey

Restaurant information
- Established: 1999
- Closed: 2020
- Website: www.mlkhny.com

Milk & Honey was a cocktail bar originally founded in New York City on 31 December 1999, with another location in Soho, London, founded by Sasha Petraske. The New York location was first located on the Lower East Side and later moved to the Flatiron District.

The London branch was operated as a private members' club, although non-members could visit before 11 pm with a prior reservation. In September 2020 Milk & Honey London closed permanently due to the COVID-19 pandemic.

The New York bar started the global speakeasy trend at its opening and helped lead the craft cocktail movement.

== House rules ==
The club operated a set of "House rules", which were:

- No name-dropping, no star fucking
- No hooting, hollering, shouting or other loud behaviour
- No fighting, play fighting, no talking about fighting
- Gentlemen will remove their hats. Hooks are provided.
- Gentlemen will not introduce themselves to ladies. Ladies, feel free to start a conversation or ask the bartender to introduce you. If a man you don't know speaks to you, please lift your chin slightly and ignore him.
- Do not linger outside the front door
- Do not bring anyone unless you would leave that person alone in your home. You are responsible for the behaviour of your guests.
- Exit the bar briskly and silently. People are trying to sleep across the street. Please make all your travel plans and say all farewells before leaving the bar.

== Cocktails created at Milk & Honey ==
- .38 Special (Michael Madrusan, Milk & Honey/Little Branch NYC 2007)
- 41 Jane Does (Toby Maloney, Milk & Honey NYC 2004)
- Adderley (Sam Ross, Milk & Honey NYC 2005)
- Adult Film Starr (Sam Ross, Milk & Honey/Little Branch NYC)
- American Trilogy (Michael McIlroy & Richard Boccato, Milk & Honey NYC 2006)
- Archangel (Michael McIlroy & Richard Boccato, Milk & Honey NYC 2006)
- Ash Wednesday (Michael McIlroy, Milk & Honey NYC 2007)
- Beggar's Mantle (Adam Wyatt-Jones, Milk & Honey London 2009)
- Bermuda Sour (Sam Ross, Milk & Honey NYC 2006)
- Blue Collar (Michael Madrusan, Milk & Honey NYC 2008)
- The Brooks (Theo Liberman, Milk & Honey NYC 2011)
- The Business (Sasha Petraske, Milk & Honey NYC 2000)
- Caffe Con Leche Flip (Sam Ross, Milk & Honey NYC 2009)
- Chet Baker (Sam Ross, Milk & Honey NYC 2005)
- Chin Up (Sam Ross, Milk & Honey NYC 2005)
- Cobble Hill (Sam Ross, Milk & Honey NYC 2005)
- Columbia (Adam Wyatt-Jones, David Fisher, Milk & Honey London 2009)
- Death & Taxes (Michael Madrusan, Milk & Honey NYC 2009)
- Deep Blue Sea (Michael Madrusan, Milk & Honey/Little Branch 2009)
- Dom Pedro (Milk & Honey London)
- Dominicana (Sasha Petraske, Milk & Honey NYC 2001)
- Don't Mind If I Do Julep? (Sam Ross, Milk & Honey NYC 2009)
- The Dutchess (Theo Liberman, Milk & Honey NYC 2012)
- East 8 Hold Up (Kevin Armstrong, Milk & Honey London 2010)
- East New York Flip (Jose Gil, Milk & Honey NYC 2006)
- Enzoni (Vincenzo Errico, Milk & Honey NYC 2003)
- Epitaph Cocktail (Nicole Cooper, Milk & Honey London 2014)
- El Guapo (Sam Ross, Milk & Honey/Little Branch NYC 2008)
- Eskimo Kiss (Sasha Petraske, Milk & Honey NYC)
- Fitzroy (Sam Ross, Milk & Honey NYC 2005)
- Gentleman's Buck (Michael Madrusan Milk & Honey NYC 2009)
- Ginger Cocktail (Sasha Petraske, Milk & Honey NYC 2002)
- Gold Rush (TJ Siegal, Milk & Honey NYC 2001)
- Golden Finch (Lauren Schell, Milk & Honey NYC 2012)
- Gordon's Cup (Sasha Petraske, Milk & Honey/East Side Co. NYC 2005)
- Grapefruit Collins (Sam Ross, Milk & Honey NYC 2005)
- Greenpoint (Michael McIlroy, Milk & Honey NYC 2005)
- Harvest Old-Fashioned (Sasha Petraske, Milk & Honey NYC)
- Imperial Buck (Sam Ross, Milk & Honey NYC)
- Late Night Reviver (Michael McIlroy, Milk & Honey NYC 2008)
- Left Hand (Sam Ross, Milk & Honey NYC 2006)
- London Calling (Chris Jepsen, Milk & Honey London 2002)
- Machu Picchu (Bobby Hiddleston, Milk & Honey London 2011)
- The Marshall (Nick Wright, Milk & Honey London 2014)
- McKittrick Old-Fashioned (Theo Lieberman, Milk & Honey/Lantern's Keep NYC 2011)
- Mercy Me (Nick Wright, Milk & Honey London 2014)
- Mercy Mercy (Joseph Schwartz, Milk & Honey NYC 2005)
- Midnight Stinger (Sam Ross, Milk & Honey NYC)
- Migration (Sam Ross, Milk & Honey NYC 2011)
- Milano Fizz (Durham Atkinson, Milk & Honey London 2009)
- Morningside Heights (Theo Liberman, Milk & Honey NYC 2015)
- New Moon (Michael Madrusan, Milk & Honey NYC)
- New York Flip (Toby Maloney, Milk & Honey NYC 2003)
- Oaxacanite (Sasha Petraske, Ben Long, Milk & Honey/John Dory Oyster Bar NYC 2012)
- Old Maid (Sam Ross, Milk & Honey/East Side Co. NYC 2004)
- Palma Fizz (Sasha Petraske, Milk & Honey NYC)
- Paper plane
- Penicillin
- Rebel Champagne Flip (Sam Ross, Milk & Honey NYC 2008)
- Red Hook (Vincenzo Errico, Milk & Honey NYC 2003)
- Red Pigeon (Manuel Alvarez, Milk & Honey London 2011)
- Right Hand (Michael McIlroy, Milk & Honey NYC 2008)
- Right Now! (Lauren McLaughlin, Jesse Harrise, Milk & Honey NYC 2013)
- Roberto Burns (Manuel Alvarez, Milk & Honey London 2011)
- Ross Collins (Sam Ross, Milk & Honey NYC 2007)
- Rumble (Michael McIlroy, Milk & Honey NYC 2006)
- Sands Cocktail (Matty Gee, Milk & Honey NYC 2006)
- Shifting Sands (Sasha Petraske, Milk & Honey NYC 2013)
- The Seaplane (Joseph Schwartz, Milk & Honey NYC)
- Silver Fox (Richard Boccato, Milk & Honey NYC 2007)
- Silver Lining (Joseph Schwartz, Milk & Honey NYC 2000)
- Son In Law (Michael McIlroy, Milk & Honey NYC)
- Son of a Beesting (Michal Madrusan, Milk & Honey NYC 2009)
- Sunflower (Sam Ross, Milk & Honey NYC 2008)
- Sunset Park (Michael Madrusan, Milk & Honey NYC 2009)
- Tattletale (Sam Ross, Milk & Honey NYC 2010)
- Three Seasons (Toby Malony, Milk & Honey NYC 2003)
- Thumbs Up! (Michael McIlroy, Milk & Honey NYC 2009)
- Too Soon? (Sam Ross, Milk & Honey NYC 2011)
- Tres Hand (Milk & Honey NYC)
- Tritter Rickey (Sam Ross, Milk & Honey NYC 2002)
- Turnpike (Joseph Schwartz, Milk & Honey NYC 2004)
- Velvet Buck (Danny Gil, Theo Liberman, Milk & Honey NYC 2013)
- Williams Fizz (Toby Maloney, Milk & Honey NYC 2003)
- Wry Grin (Sam Ross, Milk & Honey/Little Branch NYC)

== See also ==
- The World's 50 Best Bars

== Bibliography ==
- Petraske, Sasha; Moger-Petraske, Georgette (2016). Regarding cocktails. New York, NY. ISBN 978-0-7148-7281-0. OCLC 949911020.
