= Bramble (cocktail) =

Cocktail with gin

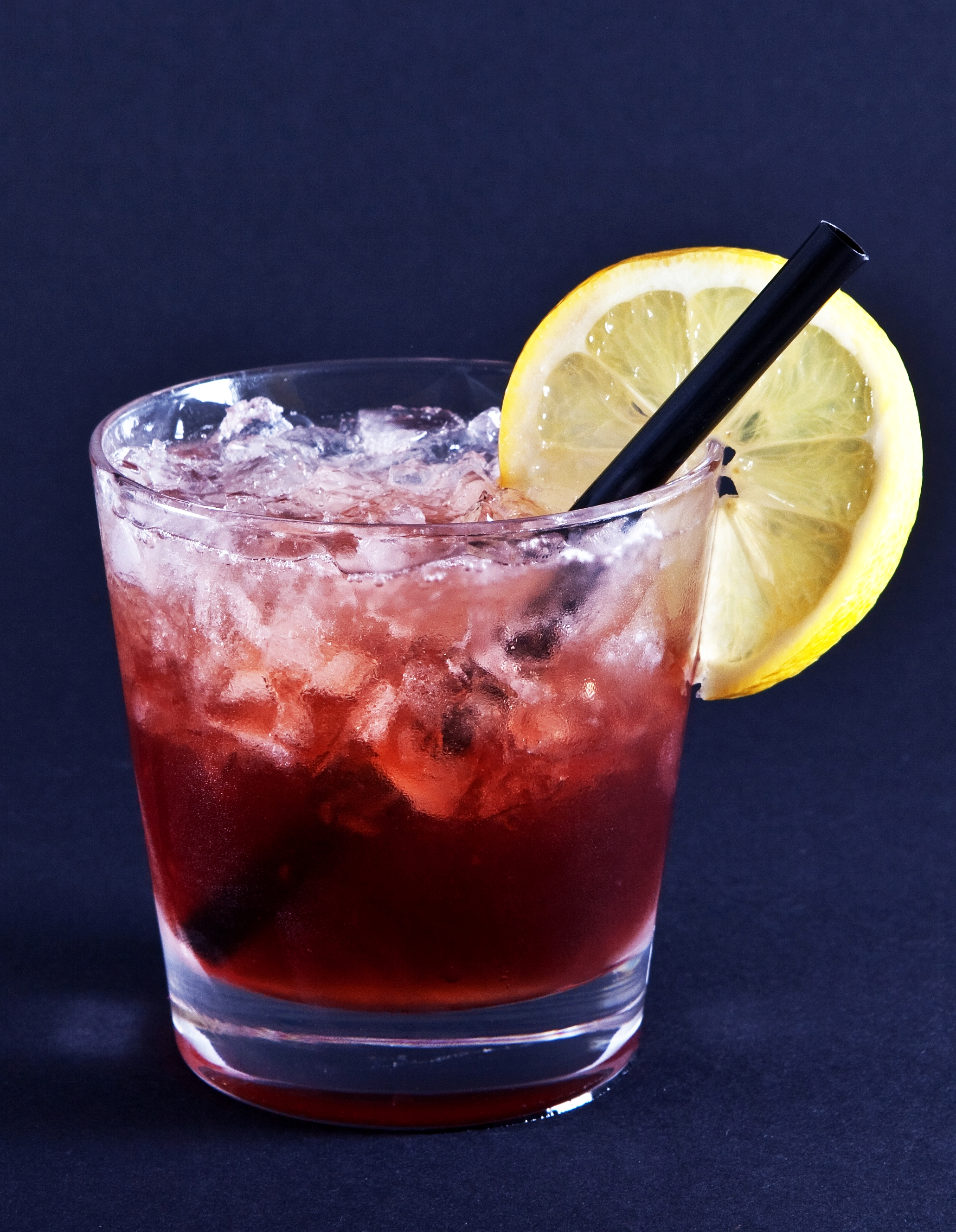
- Ingredients: 50 ml Gin; 25 ml Fresh Lemon Juice; 12.5 ml Sugar Syrup; 15 ml Crème de Mûre
- Standard drinkware: Old fashioned glass
- Standard garnish: Blackberry, lemon slice
- Served: On the rocks: poured over ice
- Preparation: Pour all ingredients into a cocktail shaker except the Crème de Mûre, shake well with ice, strain into chilled old fashioned glass filled with crushed ice, then pour the blackberry liqueur (Crème de Mûre) over the top of the drink, in a circular motion.

The Bramble is a cocktail created by the British barman Dick Bradsell in 1980s London, England. Best described as a spring cocktail, the Bramble brings together dry gin, lemon juice, sugar syrup, crème de mûre, and crushed ice. Bradsell also suggests finishing off the cocktail with some fresh red fruits (such as blackberries, cranberries) and a slice of lemon.

If crème de mûre is unavailable, many bartenders will substitute creme de cassis for it.

== History ==
The Bramble was created in London, in 1984, by Dick Bradsell. At the time, Bradsell worked at a bar in Soho called Fred's Club, and he wanted to create a British cocktail. Memories of going blackberrying in his childhood on the Isle of Wight provided the inspiration for the Bramble.

The name of the drink comes from the fact that blackberry bushes are most commonly known as brambles.

== See also ==
- List of cocktails
