= Speed Rack =

American speed bartending competition

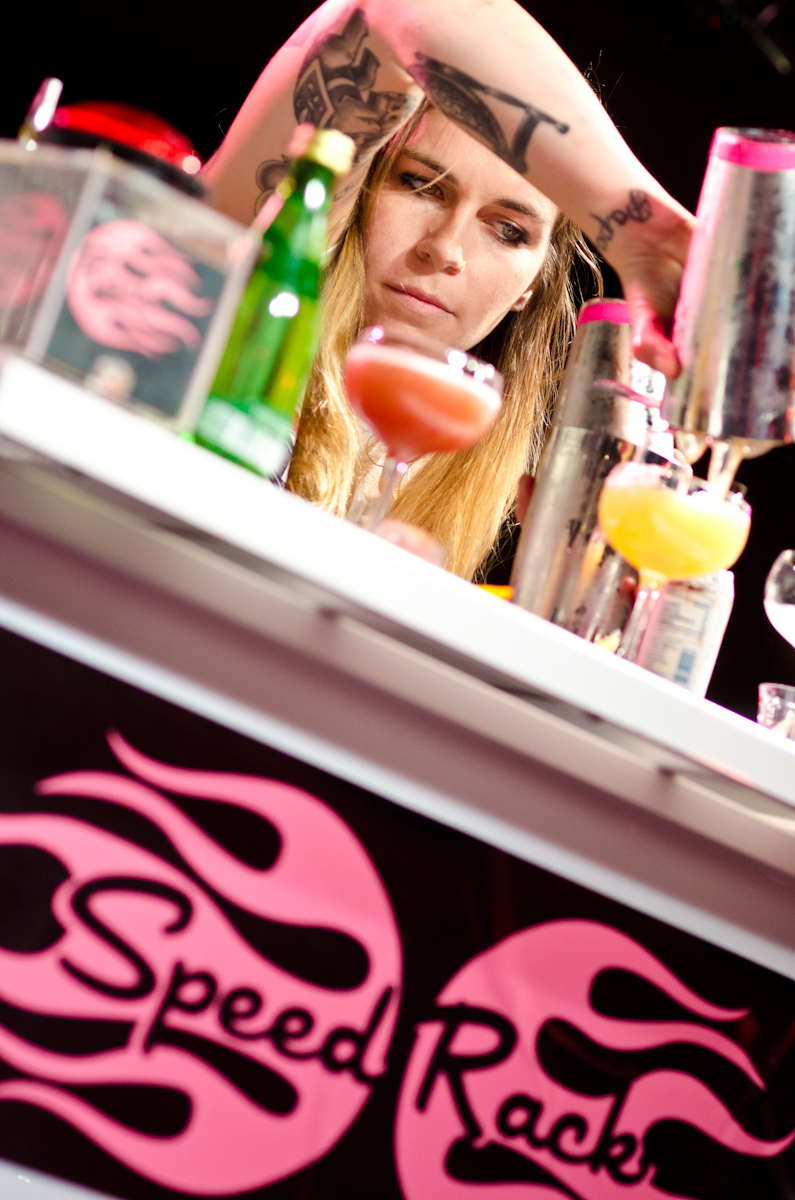
Speed Rack 2013

Speed Rack is a speed bartending competition for women in the United States that was cofounded by bartenders Ivy Mix and Lynnette Marrero. In 2011, Mix approached Marrero, who was the president of the New York City chapter of LUPEC (Ladies United for the Preservation of Endangered Cocktails), about creating a competition to showcase talented women in the craft cocktail world. The competition raises funds for Breast Cancer education, prevention and research, while promoting women bartenders in an largely male promoted industry.

The competition starts with timed heats in different cities around the country before the final in New York City. Proceeds from the tickets to every stage of the competition are donated to various breast cancer charities and the competition has raised over $350,000 in the past 5 years. 100% of the proceeds go to charity with the supplies and locations being donated, while the show is run by volunteers. Major liquor companies such as Jameson, Stoli and Barcardi are sponsors.

Speed Rack got its name from the shelf below a bar where well liquor is stored to make quick cocktails.

== Stages of competition ==
The competition makes 8 stops around the country each year for the preliminary heats. Only the top 8 in each city advance to the final round of the heat to determine the winner that will head to the finals in NYC. Competitors are given a list of 75 cocktails that could appear in the competition, giving them time to memorize the drinks, practice their speed and improve their quality. In the beginning heats the competitors must make 10 drinks from a pre-determined list as best and fast as possible, this narrows the field down to the final 8 in each city. Competitors must be skilled in both speed and accuracy, even if a competitor does not have the fastest time, if their cocktails are better than those that are quicker they could still advance in the competition. The judges are looking for the best cocktails out of the group that are made the quickest.

Each city's winner is crowned Ms. Speed Rack – Seattle or Chicago etc. and given a ticket to attend the final in New York.

== Competition locations ==
- 2012
- 2013
- 2014
- 2015
- 2016 – Nashville, Chicago, New York City, Boston, Las Vegas, San Francisco, Seattle, San Antonio
- 2017 – Chicago, New York City, Seattle, San Francisco, Atlanta, Houston, Boston, Denver

== Gender bias in bartending ==
Speed Rack is just one competition or organization that is bringing awareness to the gender gap in bartending. Kate Gerwin was the Bols bartending champion in 2014 and then established Girls with Bols that pairs new, up and coming, female bartenders with mentors.

The San Antonio Cocktail Conference hosts "Women Shaking It Up" where proceeds go to Girls Inc. of San Antonio.

LUPEC has chapters all over the country that help educate and empower female bartenders.
