= Lynnette Marrero =

American bartender, mixologist, and philanthropist

- Born: Lynnette Marrero; New York, NY
- Occupations: Bartender, Mixologist, Entrepreneur
- Years active: 2004 - Present
- Known for: Creator of "Speed Rack," Recipient of James Beard Award for mixology, Brand Mixologist for Perrier Sparkling Water, Trade Ambassador for Zacapa Rum, President of NY Chapter of Ladies United for the Preservation of Endangered Cocktails

Lynnette Marrero is an American bartender, mixologist, and philanthropist known for co-creating the world's first all-female speed bartending competition, "Speed Rack." She is widely regarded as one of the pioneer female cocktail-specific bartenders in the industry, and is based in New York City.

== Early life ==
Lynnette Marrero is a native Nuyorican, graduate of Columbia University in the City of New York. Marrero's career in the hospitality industry began when she accepted a job to become part of the opening team of New York's Flatiron Lounge, led by cocktail savant Julie Reiner. After studying Reiner and her mixology techniques, Marrero made the transition from cocktail waitress to bartender. After refining her talent she moved to another New York hotspot, Freemans NYC, where she quickly moved up the ranks to a senior bar position. In 2008, Marrero moved to Elettaria in the West Village neighborhood of Manhattan, where she and fellow mixologist Brian Miller created their award-winning cocktail list.

== Career ==
=== Elettaria ===
While bartending at Elettaria, Marrero refined her skills even further and began working with rum, which she liked due to its versatility and history. Through her work with the spirit, Marrero became fascinated with Latin culture, particularly Peruvian culture and its signature spirit, pisco. Regarded as a rum expert, Marrero became the Trade and Mixology Ambassador for Zacapa Rum, as well as the national brand mixologist for Perrier Sparkling Natural Mineral Water.

=== Post-Elettaria career ===
After working behind the bar at Elettaria, Marrero worked as a rum ambassador for UK-based alcoholic beverages provider Diageo for two years. Subsequently, she launched her own consulting company, Drinksat6. After Marrero moved to a new position as beverage director of New York's Rye House, the bar won Time Out's Eat Out Award for "Best New Cocktail Bar" and "Best Bar Restaurant Hybrid." After winning awards at Rye House, Marrero and partner Jim Kearns created the cocktail program at the Astor Room in the Kaufman Astoria Studios. In 2009, at perhaps the height of her on-bar career, Marrero was presented with the James Beard Foundation award as one of "America's Leading Female Mixologists."

=== Founding of Speed Rack ===
After founding the New York chapter of Ladies United for the Preservation of Endangered Cocktails (LUPEC), a union of sorts for female bartenders, Marrero was approached by another NY bartender, Ivy Mix. In 2011 Marrero and Mix created "Speed Rack," a national cocktail competition for female bartenders that raises money for breast cancer charities. Their goal was to promote female bartenders and distillers while supporting women's-based charities with a women-only cocktail competition In the first year of Speed Rack, the competition introduced Marrero and Mix to over 200 female bartenders across the United States, all while raising over $69,000 for breast cancer. In its 6th season, Speed Rack has expanded globally to the UK, Canada, and Asia, and cumulatively raising over $500,000.

== Awards and accolades ==
Marrero is the beverage chair for the culinary events Taste of the Nation and City Meals. She has been a guest judge at Paul Pacult's Ultimate Spirits Challenge, presented industry seminars at international bar-tending conventions Tales of the Cocktail and the Berlin Bar Convent. She was an Inaugural Honoree at the Dame's Hall of Fame at Tales of the Cocktail. In 2009 Marrero was honored by the James Beard Foundation as one of "America's Leading Female Mixologists." More recently in 2015, Marrero was named one of Food and Wine with Fortune Magazine's "Most Innovative Woman in Food and Drink.", and in 2016 named Wine Enthusiast's Mixologist/Brand Ambassador of the Year.

== See also ==
- List of bartenders
