= Chris McMillian =

American bartender

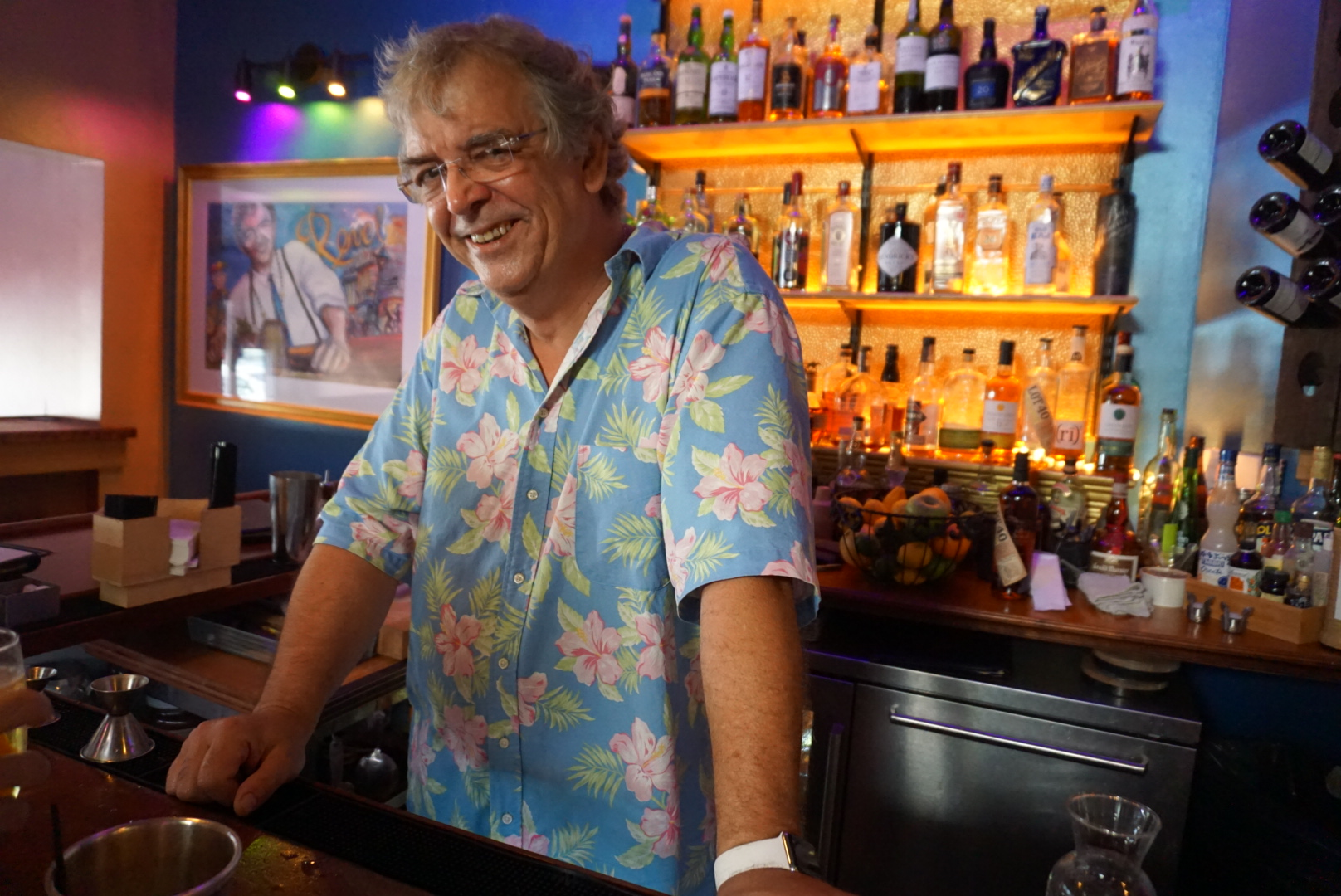
Chris McMillian at his bar, Revel, in New Orleans

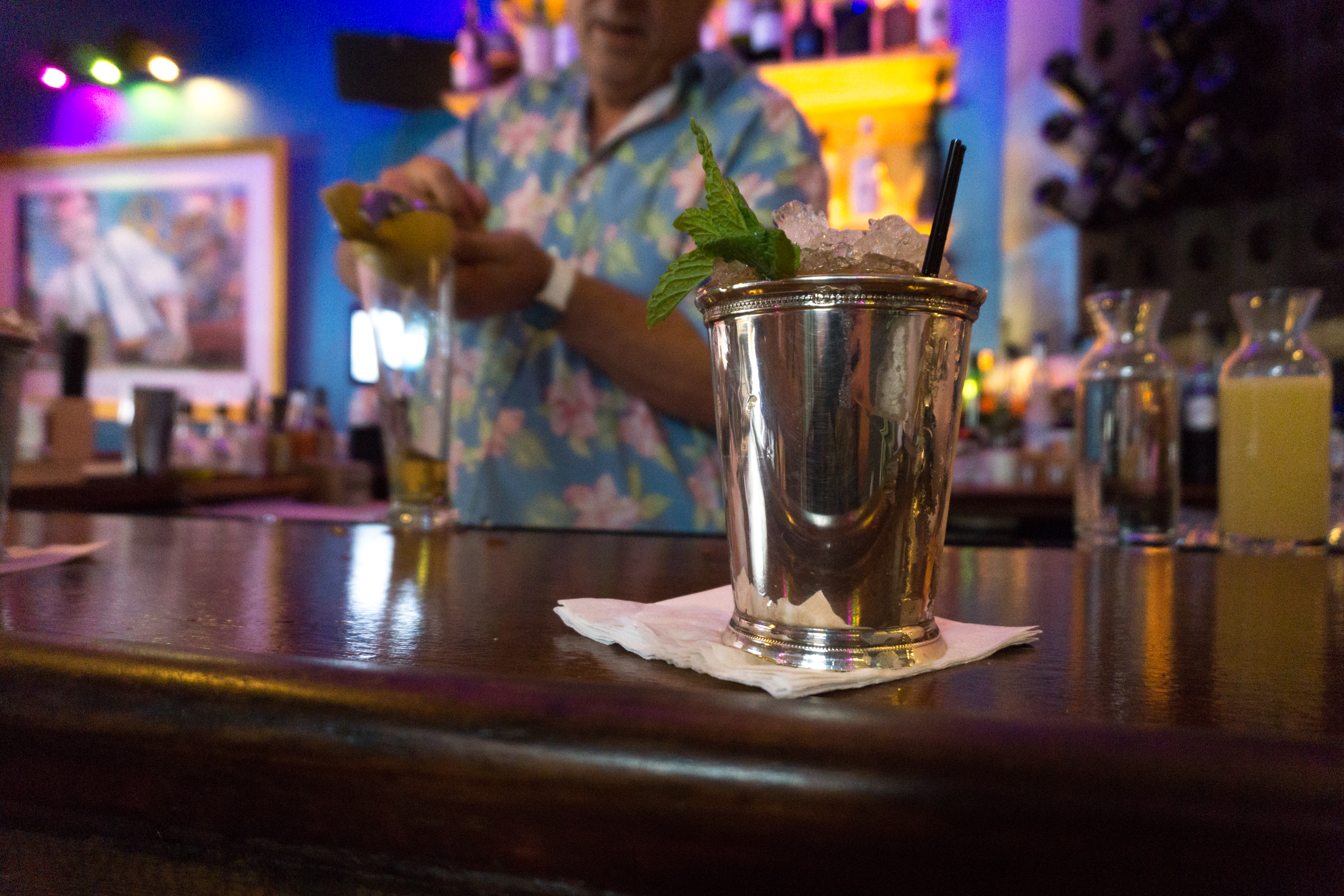
Mint julep in a traditional silver cup while Chris McMillian mixes another one in the background

Chris McMillian is a New Orleans bartender and a co-founder of the Museum of the American Cocktail. Imbibe magazine mentioned McMillian as one of the top 25 most influential cocktail personalities of the last century.

McMillian, a fourth generation bartender, has been the chief bartender at several New Orleans bars, including the Library Lounge at the Ritz-Carlton New Orleans and Bar UnCommon. As a cocktail historian, McMillian is known for telling stories or reciting drink-themed poetry while making drinks. McMillian has been mentioned in magazines such as The New York Times and The Wall Street Journal, and has been a public speaker at institutions such as the Smithsonian.

He previously worked as the chief bartender at Kingfish. In addition to bartending, he and his wife, Laura, present cocktail seminars.

In February 2016 McMillan opened Revel in Mid-City New Orleans.
