= Penicillin (cocktail) =

IBA official Cocktail

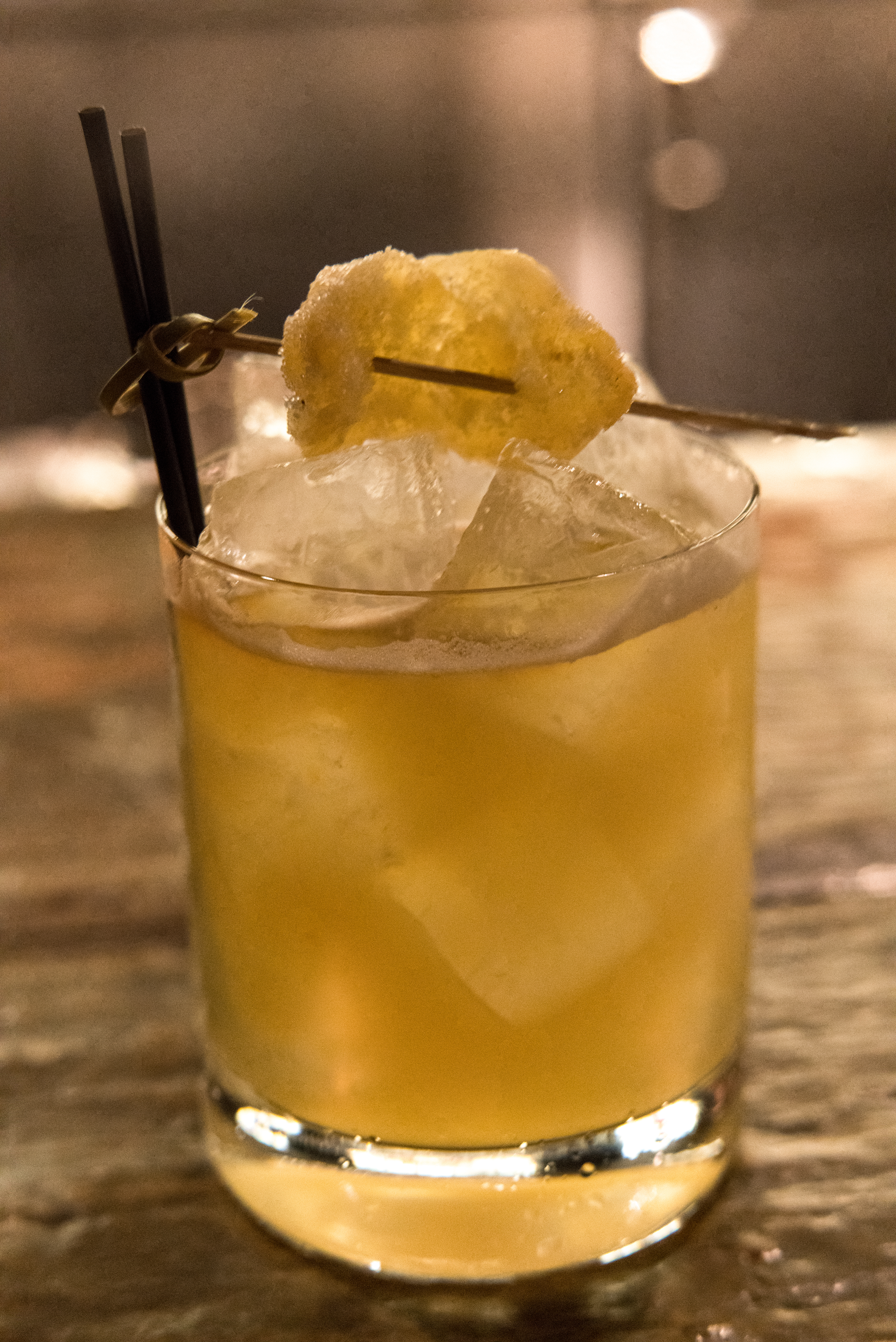
- Type: Cocktail
- Ingredients: 60 ml blended Scotch whisky; 7.5 ml Lagavulin 16y whisky; 22.5 ml fresh lemon juice; 22.5 ml honey syrup; 2–3 quarter-sized slices of fresh ginger
- Base spirit: Whisky
- Standard drinkware: Old fashioned glass
- Standard garnish: Candied ginger
- Served: On the rocks: poured over ice
- Preparation: Muddle fresh ginger in a shaker and add the remaining ingredients, except for the Islay single malt whisky. Fill the shaker with ice and shake. Double-strain into a chilled old fashioned glass with ice. Float the single malt whisky on top.

The Penicillin is an IBA official cocktail made with Scotch whisky, ginger, honey syrup, and fresh lemon juice.

== History ==
The drink was created in 2005 by Australian bartender Sam Ross living in New York at the time. Its name derives from the drug penicillin, discovered by Scottish scientist Alexander Fleming, hinting to the medicinal properties of some of its ingredients, with suggested effects similar to that of a hot toddy which is said to relieve the symptoms of cold and flu.

It was first served in 2005 at Milk & Honey. In 2024, the Penicillin was the 11th most commonly ordered cocktail at bars worldwide.

== See also ==
- List of cocktails
