= Clover Club cocktail =

Gin cocktail

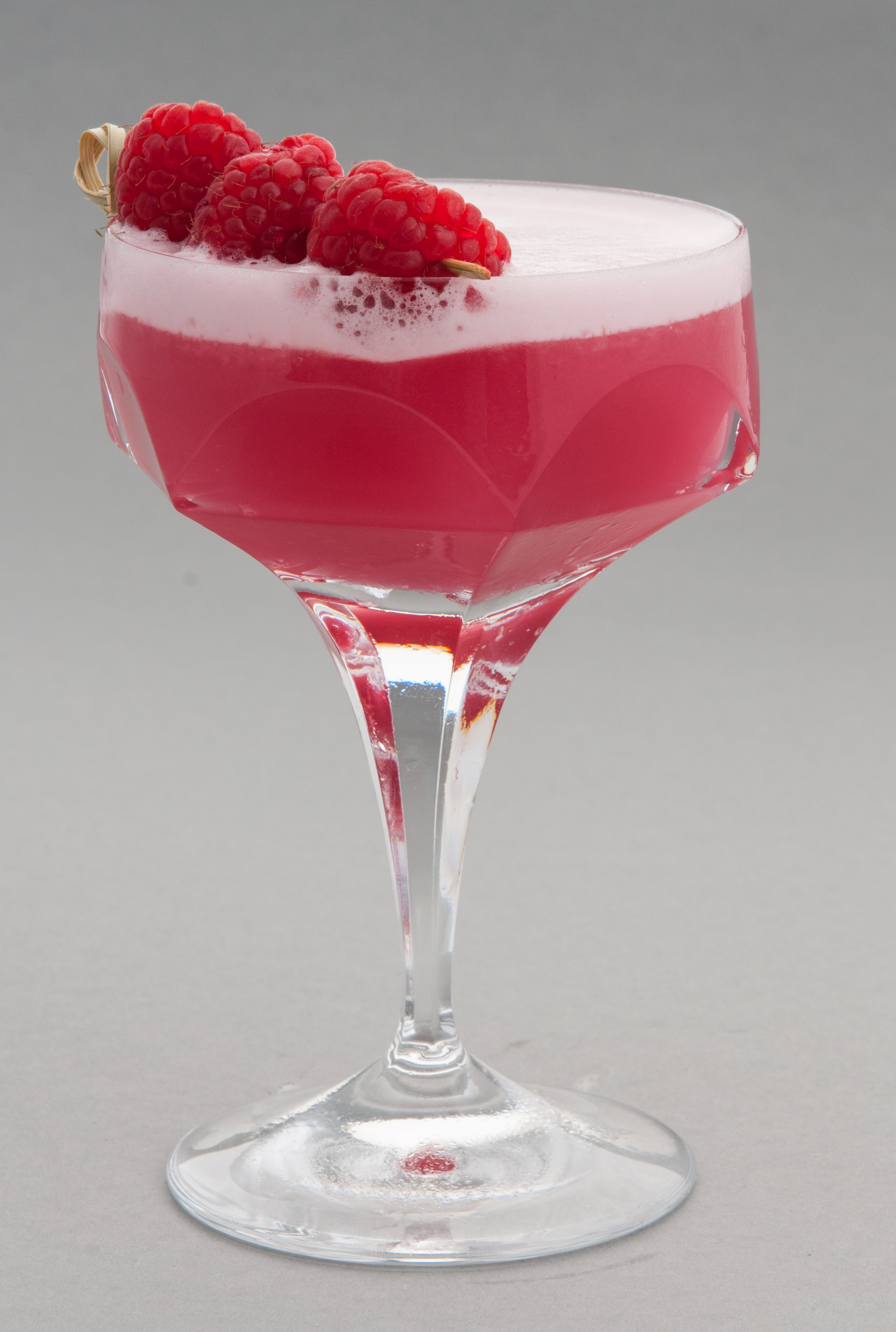
- Type: Cocktail
- Ingredients: 4.5cl Gin; 1.5cl lemon juice; 1.5cl raspberry syrup; 1 egg white or 20 ml aquafaba or 4 drops cocktail foamer
- Standard drinkware: Cocktail glass
- Served: Straight up: chilled, without ice
- Preparation: Dry shake ingredients to emulsify, add ice, shake and served straight up

A Clover Club cocktail is a shaken cocktail consisting of gin, lemon juice, raspberry syrup, and egg white. The egg white acts as an emulsifier, forming the drink's characteristic foamy head.

== History and character ==
The Clover Club cocktail is a drink that pre-dates Prohibition in the United States, and is named for the Philadelphia men's club of the same name, which met in the Bellevue-Stratford Hotel at South Broad and Walnut Streets in Center City. The Clover Club was chartered in 1882.

Of the cocktail, Robert Hess claims "It has a long history [...] and was enjoyed by the captains of industry who were members of the famous club."

Published recipes for the cocktails, nearly identical to the modern "Clover Club cocktail" appear as early as 1908. and J. A. Grohusko's Jack's Manual features a drink called "A Clover Leaf." Grohusko writes that it "is said to be popular in the city of brotherly love. Certainly it is decorative for it has a soft orchid color, with a rim of white." The recipe itself features sugar, Gordon's Gin, raspberry syrup, egg white and a sprig of mint. Cocktail books such as Applegreen's Bar Book, which published several editions and mentioned the Clover Club bar in its 1904 edition, did not include the "Clover Leaf Cocktail" until 1909.

Lifestyle and art sections of newspapers of the era included briefs about the cocktail describing it as "now new."

Its earliest published appearance in a cocktail book as "The Clover Club Cocktail" was in 1910 in Raymond E. Sullivan's The Barkeeper's Manual. His recipe included a mint sprig as garnish. The mint leaf would later fall out of favor in the "Cocktail Club" and its inclusion would make the drink the "Clover Leaf."

In its heyday, the drink was described by Jack Townsend as being enjoyed by the pre-Prohibition gentleman who would have fit in with those of the club, and was a "Distinguished patron of the oak-paneled lounge." However, by the time that Townsend was writing about the drink it was becoming unpopular, and was eventually all but forgotten. 1931's Old Waldorf Astoria Bar Days by Albert Stevens Crockett describes the Clover Club's quick rise and fall. "That was before the 'Clover Club' had won in New York temples of thirst a wide but short-lived popularity."

The drink rapidly declined in popularity. In The Gun Club Drink Book, by Charles Browne, published in 1939, he panned the once popular drink. "A clover club cocktail is a Philadelphia concoction, maybe one of the jokes indulged in at the Clover Club. It's an awful mixture. [...] This will make three cocktails if there be found three people who want them." It is unknown exactly which variation he was panning – by the late 1930s several variations of the "Clover Club" went under the name. Other ingredients included cream, nutmeg and vermouth.

Among the theories for its rapid decline is the use of raw egg in the cocktail, which many people shy away from, and partly due to the complexity of its preparation (see below). Despite the use of what some may consider to be strange ingredients the cocktail is enjoyable, and has been described as tart with the added syrup giving the drink complexity, and the egg white providing body as well as a foamy head.

Despite its origination in the fashionable Clover Club, the 1930s The Home Bartender's Guide recommended it for "Tuesday Afternoon Sewing Club" and "Crazy-Quilting Parties," suggesting a change in status that might have led to its decline.

== Preparation and variations ==
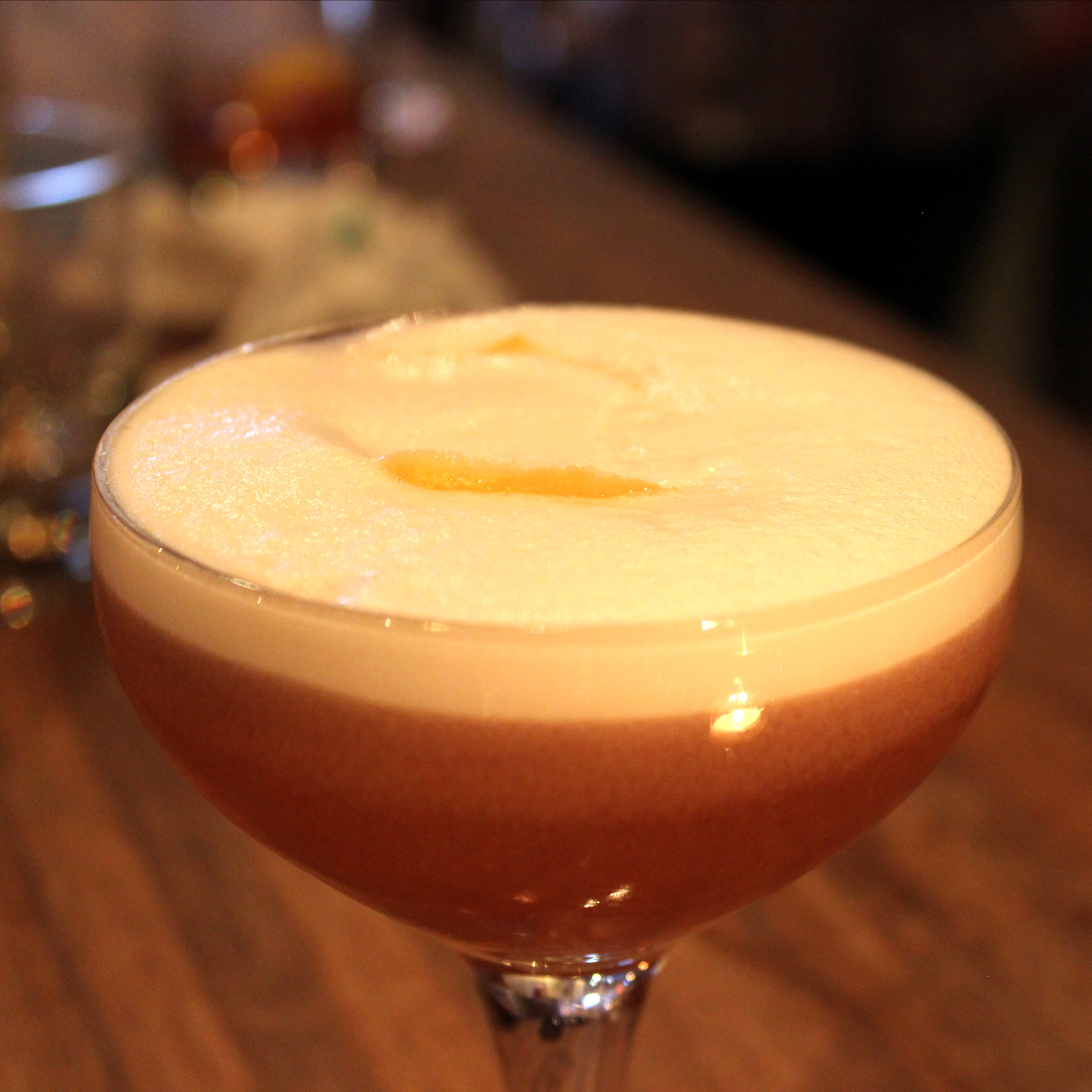
A Clover Club cocktail served at Rye in San Francisco

The drink can be a complex one to make due to the extra steps involved to get the head of foam on top of the drink. Several sources recommend that the drink be "dry shaken" (shaken without ice) with one source suggesting this be done for at least a minute. At this point ice should be added to the shaker to chill and dilute the drink. As of December 2014, Brooklyn's Clover Club restaurant used a traditional recipe of gin, dry vermouth, lemon, raspberry and egg white.

There are several variations of this drink with the most common replacing the raspberry syrup with grenadine or red currant syrup.

== Cultural impact ==
A Vocaloid producer by the name of ゆうゆ (Yuuyu) has a song featuring Hatsune Miku named after this cocktail, "クローバー♣クラブ" (Clover♣Club) in which she describes the recipe.

"How long has it been since I’ve heard anyone order a Clover Club. They were quite wicked. Not as bad as a Martini, but much more deceptive." - from "The Late, Late Show," short story by John O’Hara, collected in his "Waiting for Winter," 1966, also in an O’Hara collection, "The New York Stories", 2013

== See also ==
- Pink lady (cocktail)
