= Death & Co. =

Cocktail bar in Manhattan, New York

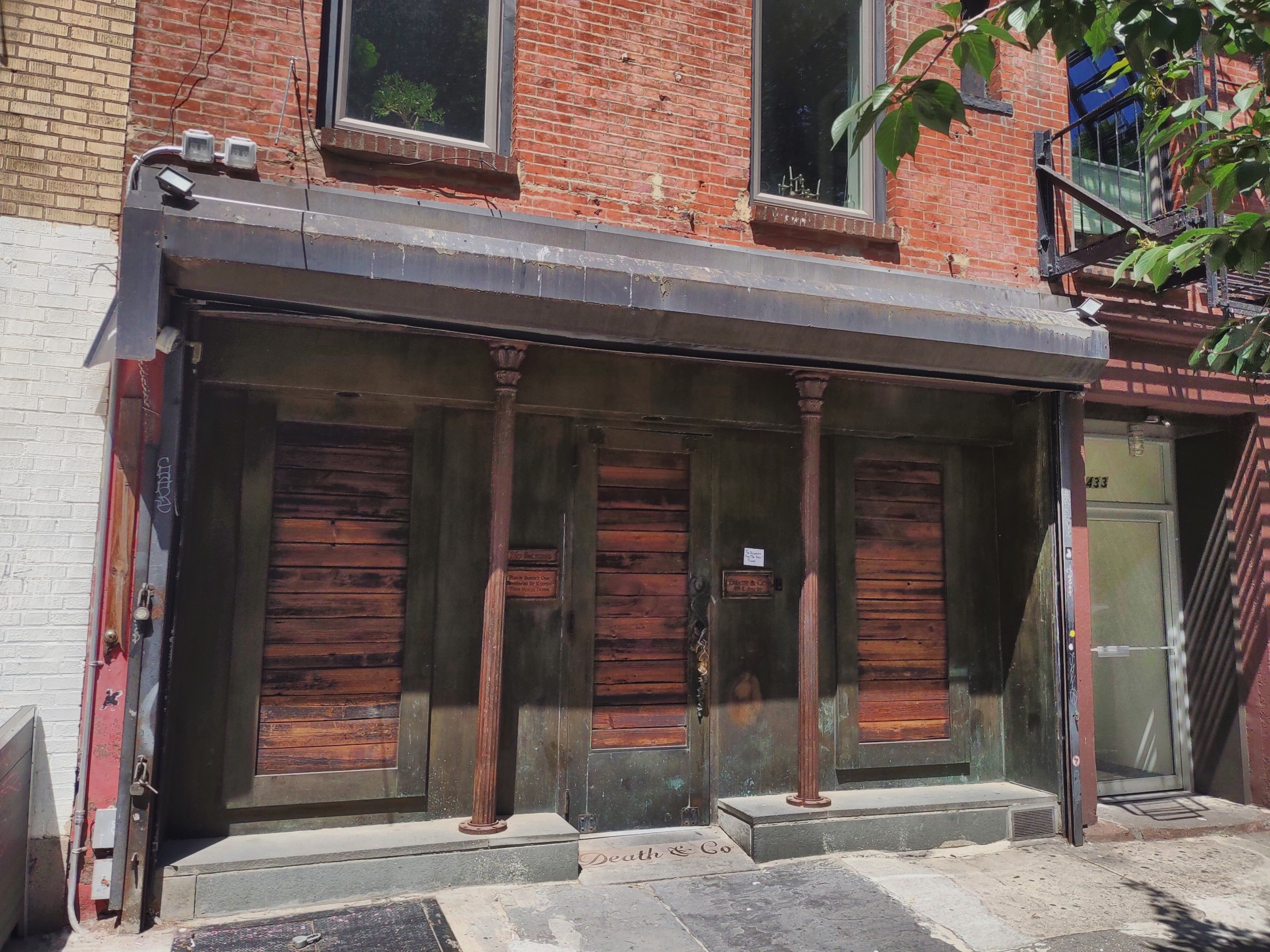
- Bar exterior
- Interactive map of Death & Co.

Restaurant information
- Established: January 2007
- Owners: David Kaplan; Ravi DeRossi
- Location: 433 East 6th Street, Manhattan, New York City
- Coordinates: 40°43′33.1″N 73°59′4.88″W
- Website: www.deathandcompany.com

Death and Company (sometimes stylized as Death & Co.) is a cocktail bar located in the East Village, Manhattan, New York, United States. Established in January 2007, the bar is owned by David Kaplan and Ravi DeRossi.

The bar is known for its lengthy cocktail menu, which contained about 50 selections prior to late 2016, when the list was shortened to 30. The bar helped lead the craft cocktail movement, originating cocktail such as the naked and famous.

As of 2026, Death & Co. has five U.S. locations in New York, Los Angeles, Denver, Washington DC, and Seattle, and one international location in Melbourne, Australia.

== See also ==
- List of restaurants in Seattle
