= Julie Reiner =

American mixologist and club owner

- Born: 1973 or 1974 (age 52–53); Oahu, Hawaii
- Occupations: Mixologist, club owner
- Spouse: Susan Fredroff
- Website: Official website

Julie Reiner (born 1973/1974) is an American mixologist, club owner, and author. Reiner is one of New York's most influential bar owners, having established the Flatiron Lounge, Lani Kai, and the Clover Club. Major publications have featured Reiner's drink recipes, including The Wall Street Journal, Playboy, Esquire, GQ, and Time Out London. Reiner has trained many female bartenders. She was named Mixologist of the Year by Wine Enthusiast in 2014.

== Early life and education ==
Reiner was born and raised in Hawaii. When her family moved to Florida, she studied general communications, graduating from Florida State University.

== Bartending ==
Reiner moved to San Francisco in 1994, trying several different jobs before becoming a cocktail waitress at the Parc 55 San Francisco hotel. Her first job as a bartender was at The Red Room, where she was trained by the manager. She later became a bartender at AsiaSF, an Asian drag bar. In 1998, Reiner moved to New York City where she was hired as bar manager for the C3 bar in the Washington Square Hotel. Her drink concoctions received attention in The New York Times and New York Magazine, and she was fired from C3 for drawing more publicity than the restaurant. Reiner was a protégé of Dale DeGroff, "the King of Cocktails".

== Clubs ==
After she was let go from C3, Reiner opened the Flatiron Lounge in 2003. The Flatiron Lounge was the first high-volume craft cocktail bar in New York City. Reiner's business partner and wife, Susan Fredroff, suggested that they offer cocktail flights, small samples of different craft cocktails, which provided a popular method for introducing customers to unfamiliar cocktails. Unlike many bars, Reiner welcomed female bartenders and provided training in craft cocktails. Reiner's system of preparing bottles containing a precise mix of liquors and liqueurs for the bar's most popular drinks streamlined the process and was picked up by other craft cocktail bars. At the Flatiron Lounge, the staff nicknamed Reiner "Destroyer of Dreams", while her partner Fedroff was "Creator of False Hopes". Romee de Goriainoff, who opened the first modern cocktail bar in Paris, said of the Flatiron Lounge, "it's the one I got the most inspiration from". The Flatiron Lounge, which Reiner opened with her partners in May 2003, is credited with helping to popularize the craft cocktail movement in New York. It closed in 2018 when the space's rent was raised from $22,000 a month to more than $30,000 a month.

Reiner assisted Audrey Saunders in establishing the Pegu Club bar in 2005.

Reiner and Fredroff opened Clover Club in Brooklyn in 2008. In 2009, it was awarded Best New Cocktail Lounge in the World by Tales of the Cocktail. In 2013, Tales of the Cocktail named Reiner Best Mentor and the Clover Club Best American Cocktail Bar and Best High Volume Cocktail Bar. In 2015, Reiner partnered with Ivy Mix to open the bar Leyenda across the street from the Clover Club. Leyenda will closed at the end of March, 2025.

Reiner opened Lani Kai, a tropical lounge with a restaurant, in late 2011, which closed two years later. In September, 2022, Reiner and partners Christine Williams, Susan Fedroff, and Sam Sherman, reopened SoHo bar Milady's.

In 2024, Reiner opened the Saloon at Clover Club, adjacent to the Clover Club. The Saloon features classic cocktails and be bar-service only.

== Related endeavors ==
Reiner appeared in Hey Bartender, a 2013 documentary by Douglas Tirola. In 2015, Reiner published The Craft Cocktail Party: Amazing Drinks for Every Occasion. In 2020, Reiner collaborated with Tom Macy to create Social Hour, a line of canned cocktails.

Reiner's company, Mixtress Consulting, provides consulting services and staff training for bars. Mixtress Consulting developed a bar programme for a Hyatt resort on Maui.

Reiner is a judge on Drink Masters, a reality competition show on Netflix that premiered October 28, 2022.

== Awards and honors ==
Wine Enthusiast named Reiner the 2014 Mixologist of the Year. Drinks International's 50 best bars in the world included Clover Club on the list for two consecutive years. Reiner was a 2011 semifinalist for James Beard Foundation Award for Outstanding Wine and Spirits Professional In 2013, Tales of the Cocktail named Reiner Best Mentor and the Clover Club Best American Cocktail Bar and Best High Volume Cocktail Bar.

In 2022, Tales of the Cocktail Foundation awarded Reiner its Helen David Lifetime Achievement Award.

In 2025, North America’s 50 Best Bars awarded Reiner the Roku Industry Icon award for Clover Club and Milady's.

== Personal life ==
Reiner and Fedroff married in 2002, and have a daughter.

== See also ==
- Lynnette Marrero
