= Dick Bradsell =

British bartender

- Born: Richard Arthur Bradsell; 4 May 1959; Bishop's Stortford, England
- Died: 27 February 2016 (aged 56); London, England
- Occupations: Bartender; writer
- Known for: His innovative work with cocktails

Richard Arthur Bradsell (4 May 1959 – 27 February 2016) was a British barman noted for his innovative work with cocktails, including the creation of many new drinks now considered to be modern classics. The Observer described him as the "cocktail king", while Waitrose Food Illustrated compared him to celebrity chefs and the San Francisco Chronicle credited him with "single-handedly (changing) the face of the London cocktails scene in the 1980s."

Bradsell was born in Bishop's Stortford, England. As a teenager, he was a friend of David Steele of the Beat. A poem of Bradsell's was adapted by singer Dave Wakeling into the lyrics of "Twist & Crawl" which appears on the Beat's debut studio album I Just Can't Stop It (1980), and for which Bradsell received a writing credit. In 1998, he played the role of The Bald Guy in Christopher Nolan's directorial debut film Following.

Bradsell was acclaimed for inventing several new cocktails, including the espresso martini, the Bramble, the Treacle, the Carol Channing, the Russian Spring Punch and the Wibble. It was reported that Bradsell could "rarely enter a bar without an enthusiastic bartender thrusting his version of the (Espresso Martini) drink at him." In 2003, he and Tony Conigliaro co-wrote several articles for the now-defunct bartending magazine Theme. In 1998 Bradsell Married London jewellery designer Vicki Sarge. They divorced in 2000.

Bradsell died from brain cancer on 27 February 2016 at his home in London.
