= Paper plane (cocktail) =

Type of cocktail

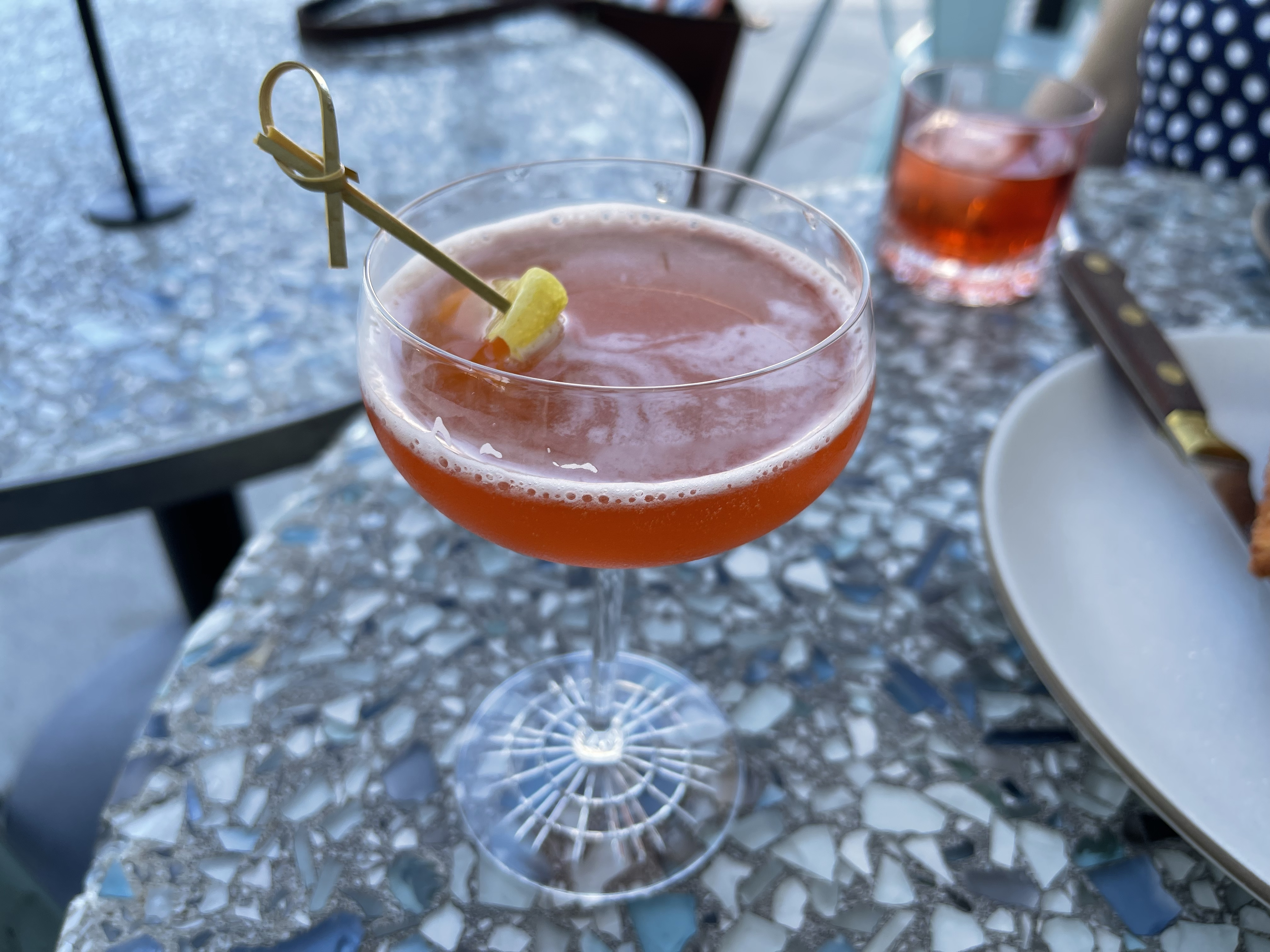
- Type: Cocktail
- Ingredients: 30 ml Bourbon whiskey; 30 ml Amaro; 30 ml Aperol; 30 ml fresh lemon juice
- Base spirit: Bourbon whiskey
- Standard drinkware: Cocktail glass
- Served: Straight up: chilled, without ice
- Preparation: Pour all ingredients into cocktail shaker, shake well with ice, strain into chilled cocktail glass.

The paper plane is a whiskey-based cocktail created in 2008. In 2020 it was added to the International Bartenders Association's (IBA) list of official cocktails as a new era drink.

== Recipe ==
The cocktail consists of equal parts bourbon whiskey, Aperol, Amaro and lemon juice, served in a standard cocktail glass. The IBA suggests the drink should be prepared without garnish, but Difford's Guide and Esquire magazine both recommend a lemon twist.

== History ==
The paper plane was created in 2008 by Sam Ross and Sasha Petraske. They created the drink as a favor for a former colleague, Toby Maloney, who wanted a summer drink to serve at his bar The Violet Hour in Wicker Park, Chicago. Ross describes the drink as "a riff on a Last Word cocktail" and says the name was inspired by the M.I.A. track "Paper Planes," a song he and Petraske listened to often while creating the drink.

When the drink was first served at The Violet Hour, Maloney listed it on the menu as the paper airplane, because he misheard Ross's "slightly buzzed" voicemail. Ross's original recipe called for Campari rather than Aperol. After submitting the recipe to Maloney, Ross began having second thoughts and revisited the drink, determining that it was too bitter and didn't reach his desired level of sweetness. He also says he tried several different spirits as the drink's base, including rye, applejack, and brandy, before selecting bourbon.

== See also ==
- List of cocktails
- Naked and famous (cocktail)
