= Robert Hess (cocktail enthusiast) =

American cocktail expert

Robert B. Hess is a cocktail expert, a co-founder of the Museum of the American Cocktail, and a technology evangelist for Microsoft. Hess is the author of The Essential Bartender's Guide: How to Make Truly Great Cocktails published by Mud Puddle Books in 2008. He is also the host of "The Cocktail Spirit," an online video series published by the Small Screen Network. In late 2008, Hess, along with several other well-known cocktail personalities, founded The Chanticleer Society, a "Worldwide Organization of Cocktail Enthusiasts." Hess also writes a column entitled "Classic Cocktails" for the bi-monthly fine beverage publication, Mutineer Magazine.

Hess has been married to noted New York City bartender Audrey Saunders since 2011.

== Job history ==
Hess has been an employee of Microsoft since 1988 and is the group manager of Windows Evangelism which is part of Microsoft's developer team. He also hosted the .NET Show which was put out by the Microsoft Developer Network (MSDN). He originally worked on the OS/2 project, a partnership between Microsoft and IBM, where he was the System Marketer which performed roughly the same duty as today's technology evangelists.

== Museum of the American Cocktail ==
Hess is acknowledged to be an expert on cocktails. In 2005, he co-founded the Museum of the American Cocktail in New Orleans.
