= Sasha Petraske =

American bar owner

Sasha Nathan Petraske (March 16, 1973 – August 21, 2015) was the founder of the New York City cocktail bar Milk & Honey, as well as a partner and creative force behind many of the world's most highly regarded bars. During his lifetime he was credited with inventing modern cocktail culture.

== Life and career ==
Petraske was born in Greenwich Village, New York City to Alan and Anita Petraske, an administrator in the health care industry and a Village Voice fact-checker. Often described as a savant, Petraske dropped out of Stuyvesant High School at the age of 17, and never received a formal post-secondary education. After traveling cross-country, he joined the U.S. Army. He served in Alpha Company 2nd/75th Ranger Regiment and engineered his exit after three years of service by falsely claiming that he was gay. Following his departure from the army, he tended bar, ultimately opening Milk and Honey.

His bar was known for its focus on attention-to-detail on classic cocktail recipes and a strict set of "Rules of Etiquette" to ensure a polite and enjoyable drinking experience, while carefully minimizing unnecessary costs and maintaining consistent recipe ratios through pioneering the use of a bartending jigger to ensure precise pours of liquid cocktail ingredients, an unusual practice at the time. Cocktail historian Dale DeGroff described Petraske as a "Solve the problem, common-sense kind of guy."

Petraske was very prolific and together with partners was the creative responsible for dozens of notable venues, including:

- Milk and Honey, NY (1999)
- Milk and Honey, London (2002)
- East Side Company Bar, NY (2005)
- Little Branch, NY (2005)
- Bohanan's, San Antonio (2006)
- White Star, NY (2008)
- The Varnish, Los Angeles (2009)
- Dutch Kills, NY (2009)
- The Everleigh, Melbourne (2011)
- Middle Branch, NY (2012)
- Half Step, Austin (2014)
- Wm. Farmer & Sons, NY (2015)

In May 2015, Petraske married journalist Georgette Moger.

== Death ==
He was found dead at his home in Hudson, New York on August 21, 2015.

== Legacy ==
Petraske remained influential after his death, having trained many bartenders in his lifetime. Bars around the world memorialized him after his death, toasting him with daiquiris – a cocktail he loved – at 9pm local time on August 31, 2015, in honor of the traditional evening hour of Milk and Honey's opening.

His wife, Georgette Moger-Petraske, compiled his writings after his death in a book, Regarding Cocktails, that contained many of his innovative recipes as well as selected writings on the art of cocktail-making and tending bar.

== See also ==
- Craft cocktail movement
- List of bartenders
