= Naked and famous (cocktail) =

Equal-parts cocktail

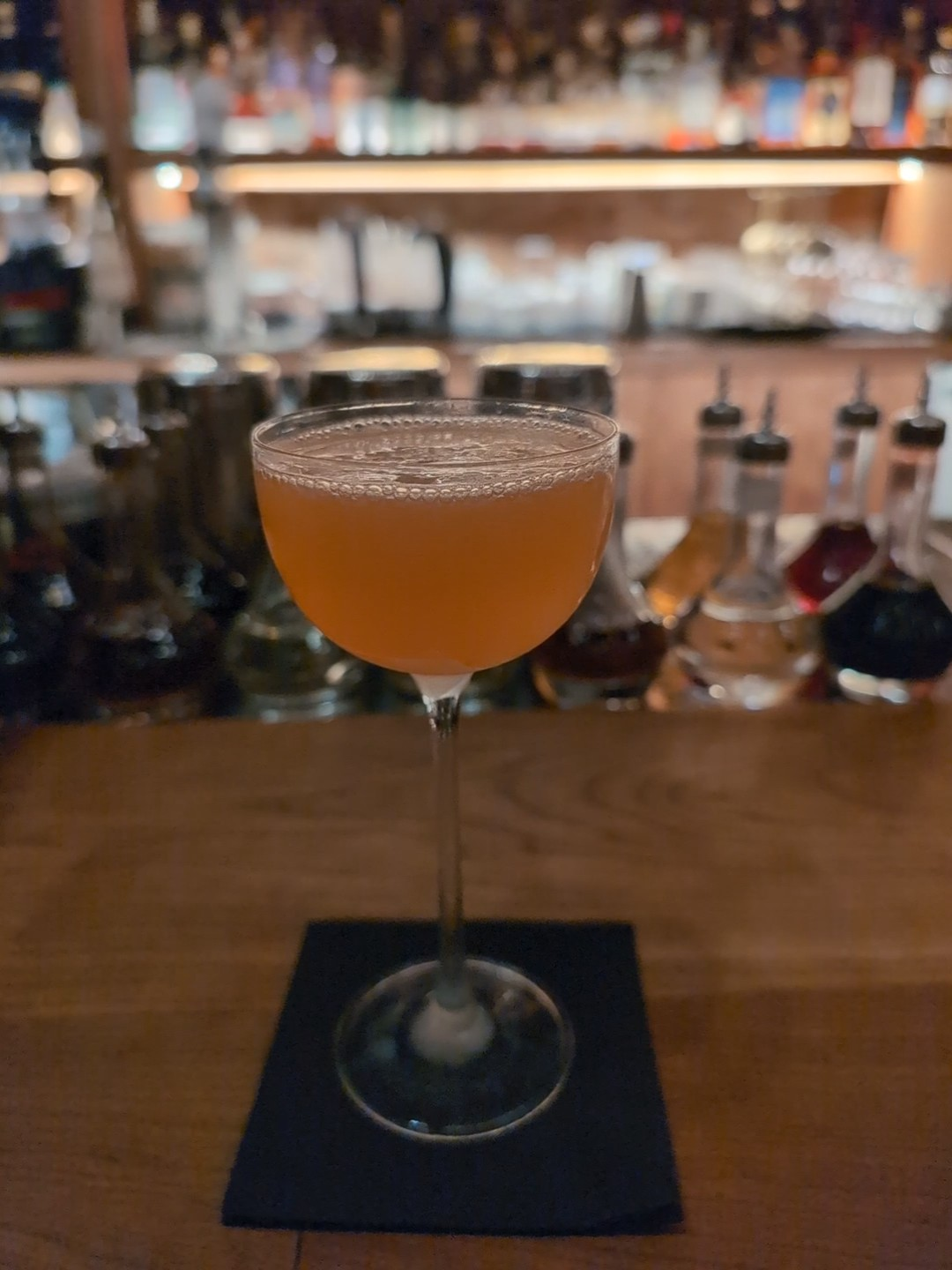
- Type: Cocktail
- Ingredients: 2.25 cl mezcal; 2.25 cl yellow Chartreuse; 2.25 cl Aperol; 2.25 cl fresh lime juice
- Base spirit: Mezcal
- Standard drinkware: Cocktail glass
- Served: Straight up: chilled, without ice
- Preparation: Pour all ingredients into shaker with ice cubes. Shake well. Strain into chilled cocktail glass.

The naked and famous is an IBA official cocktail, consisting of equal parts mezcal, yellow Chartreuse, Aperol, and fresh lime juice.

== History ==
Joaquín Simó created the naked and famous in 2011 at the Death and Company cocktail bar in New York City. The drink is mezcal-based, and it combines elements of the last word and paper plane cocktails.

The International Bartenders Association added the naked and famous to its list of official cocktails in 2020.

== See also ==
- List of cocktails
