= Tony Conigliaro (mixologist) =

British bartender and writer

Tony Conigliaro is a British bartender and writer. He has written for industry magazines Theme and Class, and has been featured in articles in the mainstream UK media, in the likes of The Guardian and The Daily Telegraph. The New York Times has acclaimed him as the "No.1 Bradsell protégé", comparing him to renowned bartender Dick Bradsell, and he has also been called "one of mixology's global poster boys".

Conigliaro published his first book, Drinks, in 2012. The US edition, published in 2013 as The Cocktail Lab, won the 2014 James Beard award for best beverage book.
