= Spirit of 77 =

Sports bar and restaurant in Portland, Oregon, U.S.

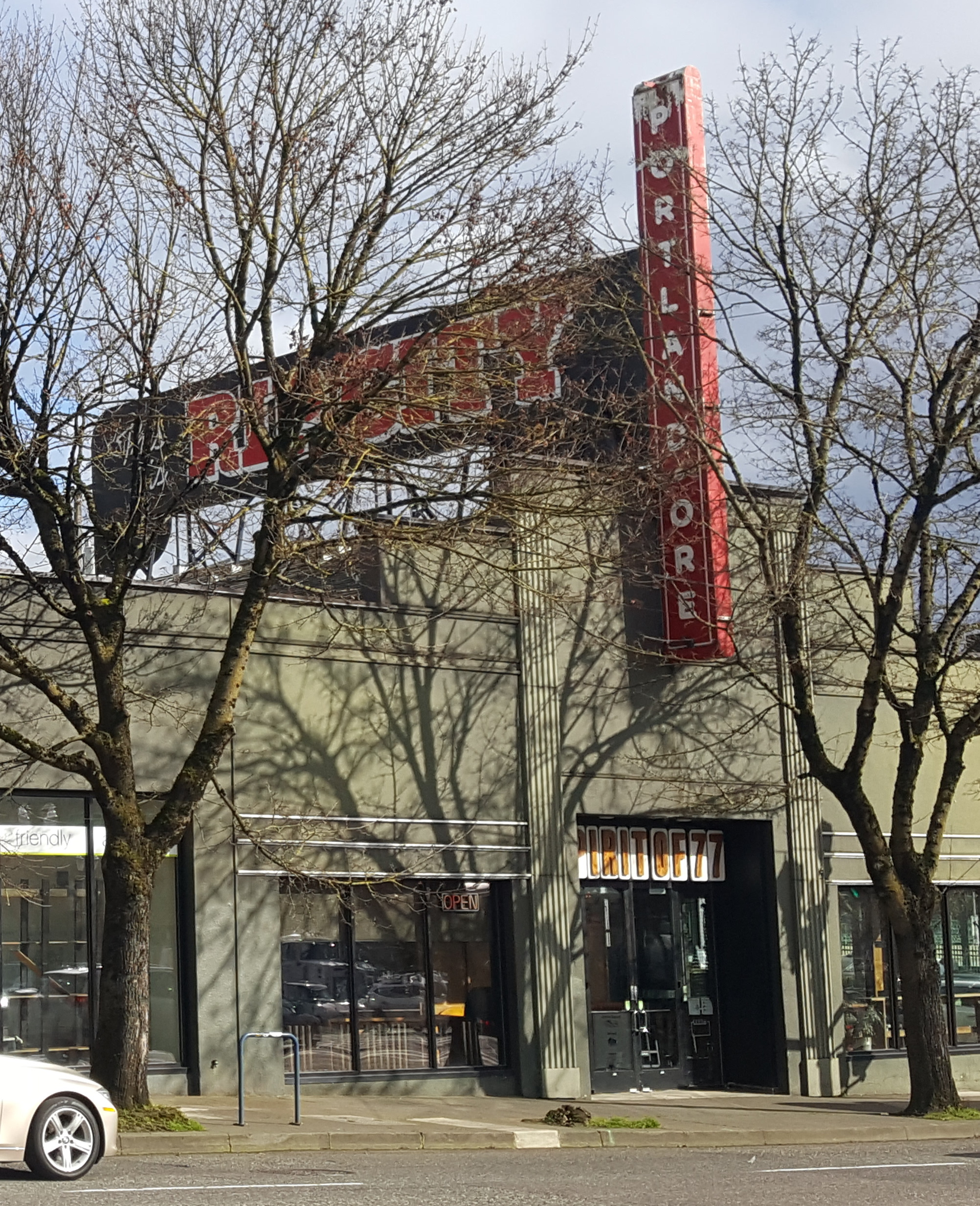
- The bar's exterior in 2021
- Interactive map of Spirit of 77

Restaurant information
- Established: 2010
- Location: 500 Northeast Martin Luther King Jr. Boulevard, Portland, Multnomah, Oregon, 97232, United States
- Coordinates: 45°31′36.2″N 122°39′41″W
- Website: spiritof77bar.com

Spirit of 77 is a sports bar and restaurant in Portland, Oregon, United States. Opened by Nate Tilden in 2010, the bar operates in the northeast Portland part of the Lloyd District. It is named after the Portland Trail Blazers championship season (1977 NBA Finals) and displays team memorabilia. Donald Kenney and Damian Lillard are the current co-owners of the bar.

The business was named one of the nation's best sports bars by Esquire in 2011, Thrillist in 2017, and The Daily Meal in 2018. It is also among restaurants that earned Tilden a nomination in the Outstanding Restaurateur category of the James Beard Foundation Awards in 2016.

== Description ==
Spirit of 77 operates in the northeast Portland part of the Lloyd District. It displays Portland Trail Blazers memorabilia. The interior has multiple television screens, a drop-down projector, and games like darts, skee-ball, and Pop-A-Shot. The Portland Mercury has described Spirit of 77 as a "cavernous shrine to the Trailblazers". The upstairs event space is called Lil' Spirit.

The menu, described by Serious Eats as "gourmet stoner food", has included nachos, burgers topped with potato chips, charcuterie boards, fish sandwiches, hushpuppies with jalapeño jelly, and a "local farm salad". For the Super Bowl in 2011, the bar's specials included hushpuppy corn dogs, toasted ravioli with short rib and pork belly, and a Wisconsin cheddar and beef sandwich. Drink options include beer and cocktails.

== History ==
Opened by Nate Tilden in 2010, the bar is named after the Portland Trail Blazers first and only championship season (1977 NBA Finals). The business has been described as a collaboration between Tilden's Clyde Common and the Ace Hotel, including the hotel's co-owner Jack Barron. Donald Kenney and Damian Lillard have also been co-owners.

Spirit of 77 closed temporarily for kitchen renovations and updated the menu in 2012. During the COVID-19 pandemic, the bar planned to operate a patio bottle shop for take-out drinks. Andrew Gregory has been a chef at Spirit of 77.

The bar has hosted viewing parties for Portland Fire, soccer (including the Portland Timbers), and other local and national sports games. In 2010, Spirit of 77 screened a boxing match between Antonio Margarito and Manny Pacquiao. The bar hosted a viewing party in 2011 for Top Chef, featuring contestant Naomi Pomeroy; mayor Sam Adams also attended the event and gave Pomeroy a "Fork to the City".

In 2026, the bar was among local restaurants, community organizations, and other businesses that joined the "We Are Rip City" campaign in support of the Moda Center renovation project.

== Reception ==
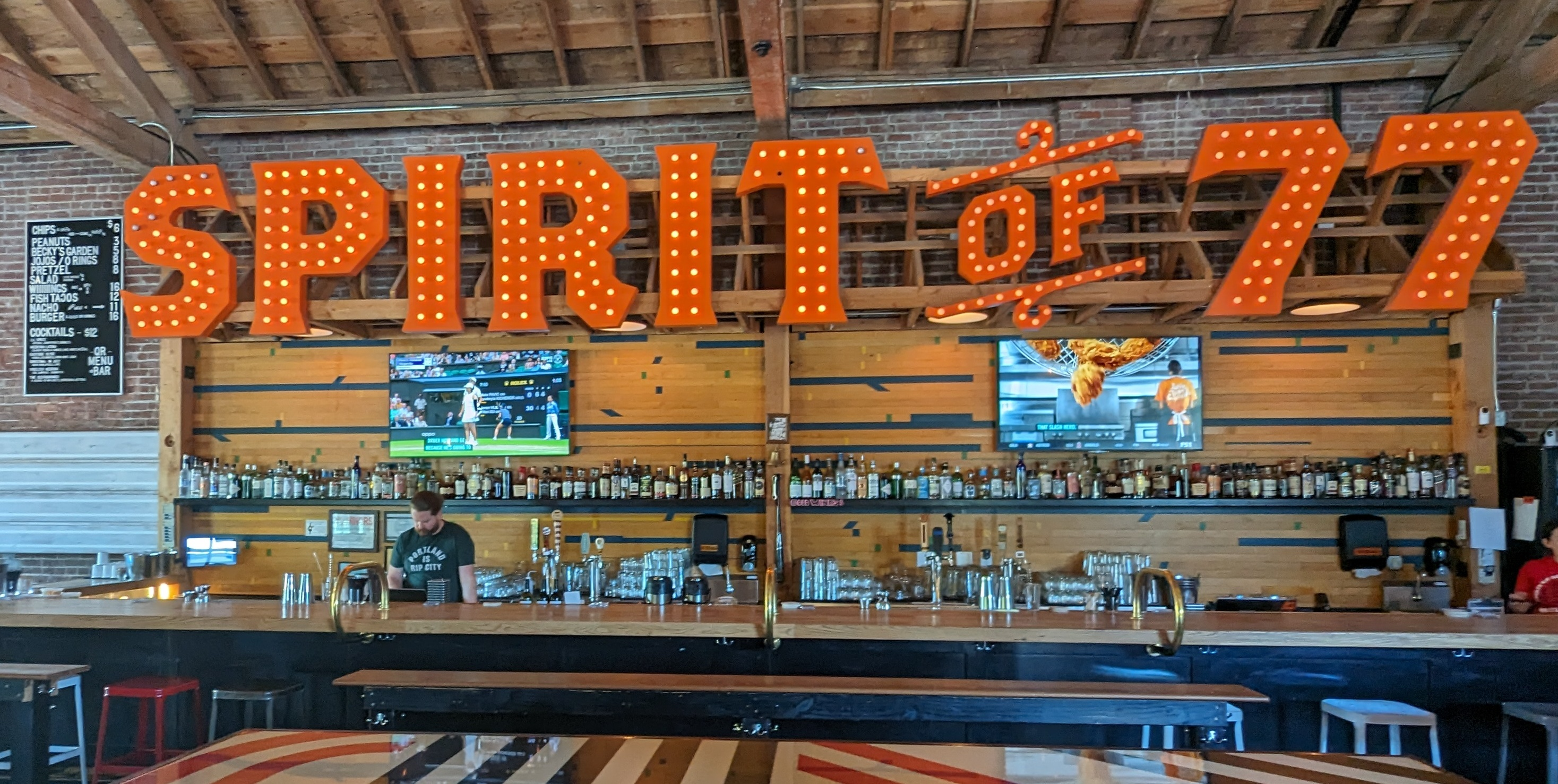
Interior bar, 2023

Spirit of 77 was included in Esquire's "best bars" list in 2011. In 2011, Bill Simmons of ESPN said the bar was "perfectly named" and Michael Russell of The Oregonian described the business as "hip". Spirit of 77 was ranked Portland's fourth best sports bar in the newspaper's 2016 readers' choice poll. In 2016, Tilden was nominated in the Outstanding Restaurateur category of the James Beard Foundation Awards for Clyde Common, Olympia Provisions, Spirit of 77, and The Richmond Bar.

Noah Davis included Spirit of 77 in Thrillist's 2017 overview of the nation's best sports bars. In 2018, the business ranked number 105 in The Daily Meal's 2018 list of the nation's 150 best bars. The website's Shannon Darnall also included Spirit of 77 in a list of the nation's 50 best sports bars. The Daily Meal said the business was Oregon's best sports bar in a 2018 overview of the state's best food and drink, and Kaitlin Miller selected Spirit of 77 to represent Oregon in the website's 2020 overview of the best sports bars in each state.

In 2010, Tilden won in the Empire Builder of the Year category of Eater Portland's annual Eater Awards; additionally, Spirit of 77 was nominated in the So Hot Right Now category. The website's Allison Jones said the business "popped-a-shot over every sports bar in town, and then some". In 2019, the website recommended the bar for sports viewing near the Moda Center and the Oregon Convention Center. Spirit of 77 was included in Willamette Week's 2011 list of Portland's ten best soccer bars. The business won in the Best Sports Bar category of the newspaper's annual 'Best of Portland' readers' poll in 2015, 2016, and 2020. It placed second in the same category in 2026.
