= The Richmond Bar =

Defunct bar in Portland, Oregon, U.S.

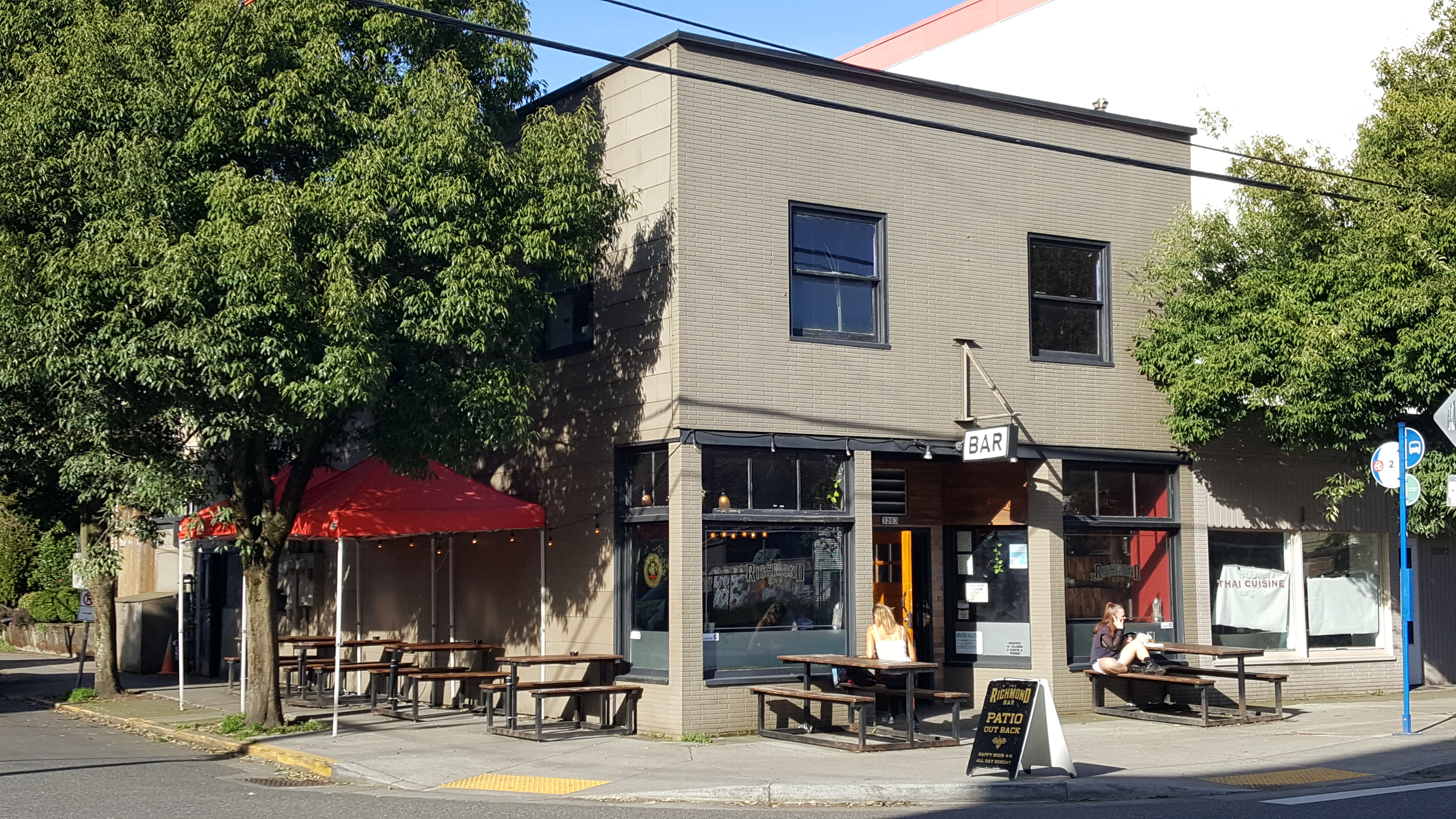
- The bar's exterior in March 2022
- Interactive map of The Richmond Bar

Restaurant information
- Established: 2013
- Closed: October 17, 2025
- Owners: Martin Schwartz; Nate Tilden
- Location: 3203 Southeast Division Street, Portland, Multnomah, Oregon, 97202, United States
- Coordinates: 45.5049°N 122.6324°W
- Website: therichmondbar.com

The Richmond Bar was a bar in Portland, Oregon, United States. The business operated in southeast Portland's Richmond neighborhood from 2013 to 2025.

== Description ==
The Richmond Bar was located in southeast Portland's Richmond neighborhood. The bar offered beer and cocktails in a "rustic and cozy space", according to Thrillist. Beers from Oregon and Europe were available; according to Matthew Korfhage of Willamette Week, the cocktails "skew[ed] sweetly medicinal" and the "neutral-and-red-hued bar [had] honed the refined, unshowy comforts now expected of a Portland bar".

== History ==
Co-owners Martin Schwartz and Nate Tilden opened the bar in 2013, in a space formerly occupied by Matchbox Lounge. A back patio was added in 2015, increasing seating capacity by 30 people.

In 2016, Tilden was nominated for a James Beard Foundation Award as restaurateur of Clyde Common, Olympia Provisions, Spirit of 77, and The Richmond Bar. The bar closed temporarily during the COVID-19 pandemic. In September 2025, the business announced plans to close permanently in October. The bar closed on October 17, 2025. Richmond Club began operating in the space in 2026.

== Reception ==
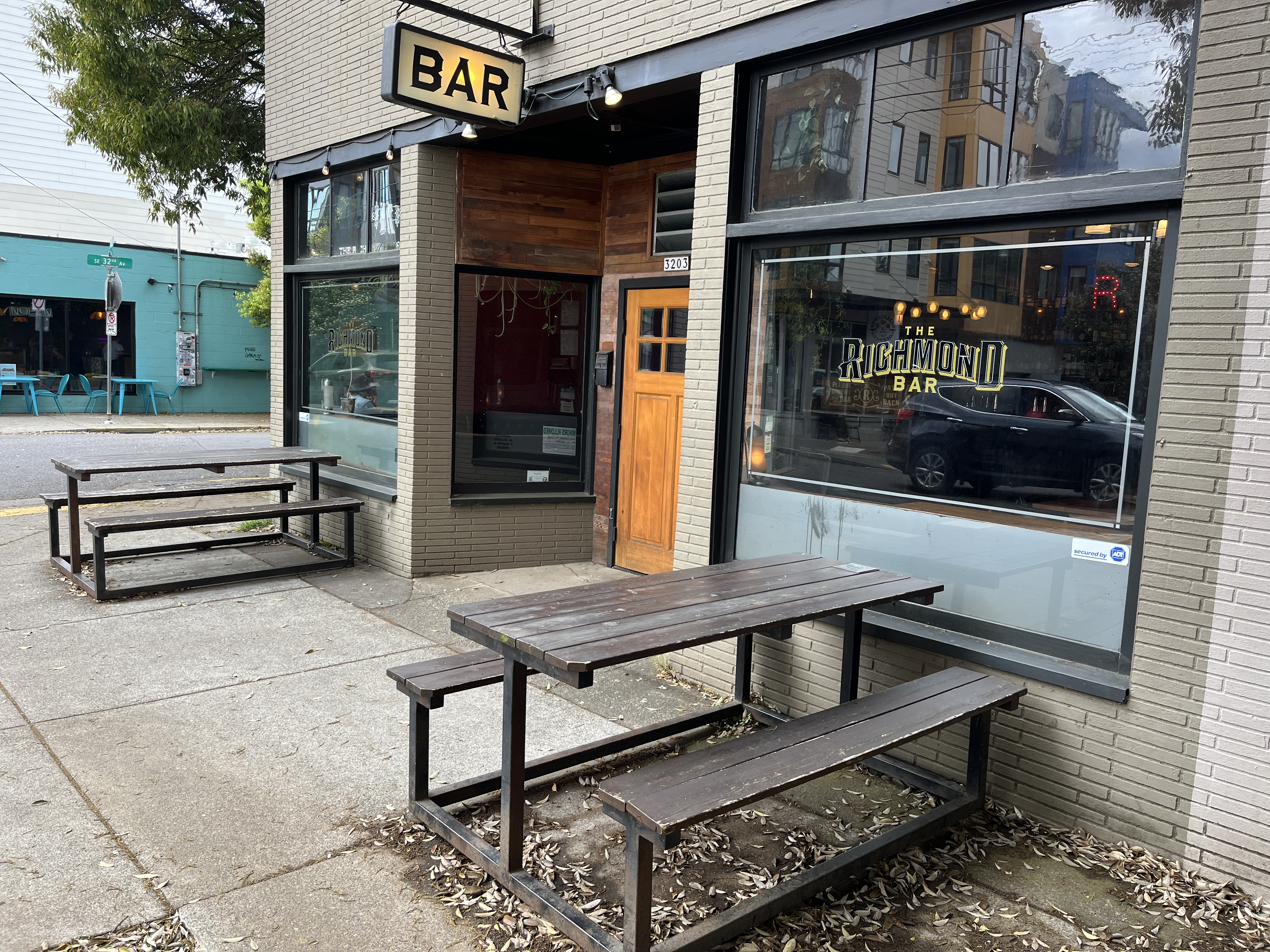
The bar's exterior in 2025

In The Oregonian's 2014 list of Portland's ten best new bars, Samantha Bakall recommended the cocktails and described the bar as "deceivingly complex, with far more to offer than a waiting area for Pok Pok across the street". She wrote, "Let the simple, illuminated 'bar' sign hanging on the building draw you into the surprisingly handsome and cozy spot with a British-meets-Pacific Northwest vibe decorated with tufted leather booths, imported wall paper and large wooden tables." Matthew Korfhage said in Willamette Week's 2015 bar guide of the city:

The cozily tasteful Richmond Bar is often an emptying station for the most cheerily clueless of Division tourists, wobbling in heels they don't quite understand, while happy hours are home to a mixed bag of neighborhood types (doctors and lawyers and such, like Willie Nelson recommends) and middle-aged couples either waiting for their walk-in meals or giving up and eating from a fine selection of upscale bar snacks. And yet I will always be drawn inside, because the tiny cocktail menu contains three of my favorites in all of Portland: a gin-absinthe Le Reveiller that easily lives up to its name, and an herbal Sassafras named after the dominant note in the Root spirit mixed with tequila, mezcal and Cynar—like sarsaparilla with some heat in the nose—and a tequila-and-shrub Paloma that's sweetly herbal and lovely in its balance. Treat it like a restaurant whose best dishes are made of booze.

== See also ==
- List of defunct restaurants of the United States
