= Lynchburg lemonade =

Cocktail

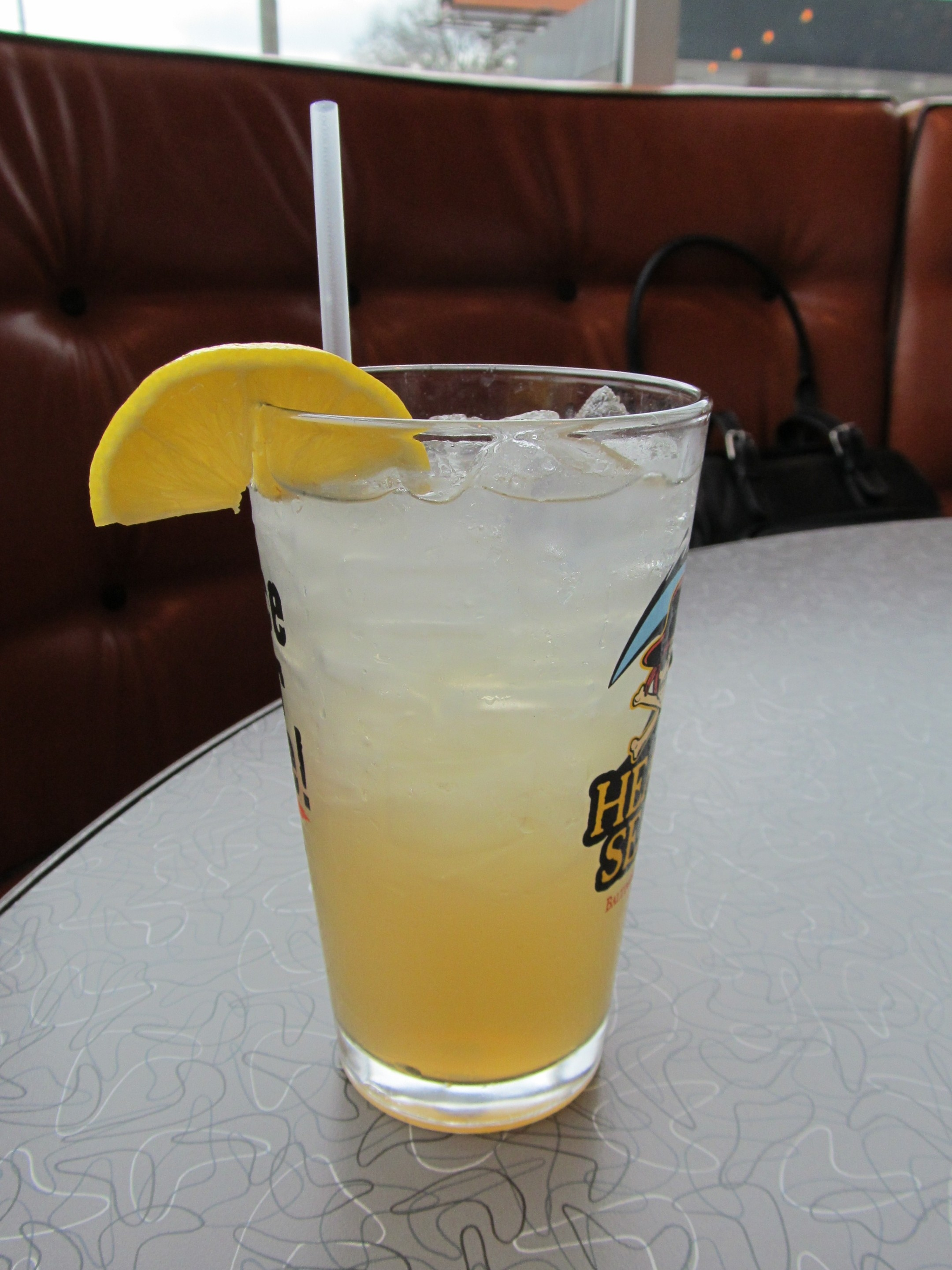
- A Lynchburg lemonade at a restaurant
- Type: Cocktail
- Ingredients: 1+1/4 oz Jack Daniel's; 3/4 oz triple sec; 2 oz sour mix; lemon-lime
- Base spirit: Tennessee whiskey
- Standard drinkware: Collins glass
- Standard garnish: Lemon wedge, maraschino cherry
- Served: On the rocks: poured over ice
- Preparation: Shake first three ingredients with ice and strain into ice-filled glass. Top with the lemonade or lemon-lime. Add ice and stir. Garnish with lemon slices and cherries.

A Lynchburg lemonade is a cocktail (a long drink) made with, among other ingredients, Jack Daniel's Tennessee whiskey and a citrus-flavored soda or juice. It is named after Lynchburg, Tennessee, home of the Jack Daniel's distillery. A typical recipe is:

- 1 part Jack Daniel's
- 1 part triple sec
- 1 part sour mix
- 4 parts lemon-lime soda.

It thus belongs to the sour family of mixed drinks. It is normally served over ice and garnished with a lemon and possibly a cherry.

== History and controversy ==
The drink was created and given its name by Alabama restaurant and lounge owner Tony Mason in 1980. It was the subject of the 1987 court case Mason v. Jack Daniel Distillery. Mason alleged that a Jack Daniel's distillery sales representative visited his restaurant and somehow learned the recipe for the drink, which he contended was a trade secret. A year later, Jack Daniel's launched a national campaign to promote the drink. Mason subsequently filed suit in the Madison County Circuit Court, seeking over US$13 million in compensatory and punitive damages for misappropriating his recipe. The court ruled in Mason's favor but decided to award him no money. After the trial, the presiding judge offered to pay Mason one dollar out of his own pocket which Mason rejected. In Mason v. Jack Daniel Distillery, Mason appealed the decision to the Alabama Civil Appellate court, which found that Mason could be entitled to more than nominal compensatory damages and overturned the decision, ordering a new trial. The new trial resulted in a victory for Jack Daniel Distillery.
