= Alpenrausch (restaurant) =

Defunct restaurant in Portland, Oregon, U.S.

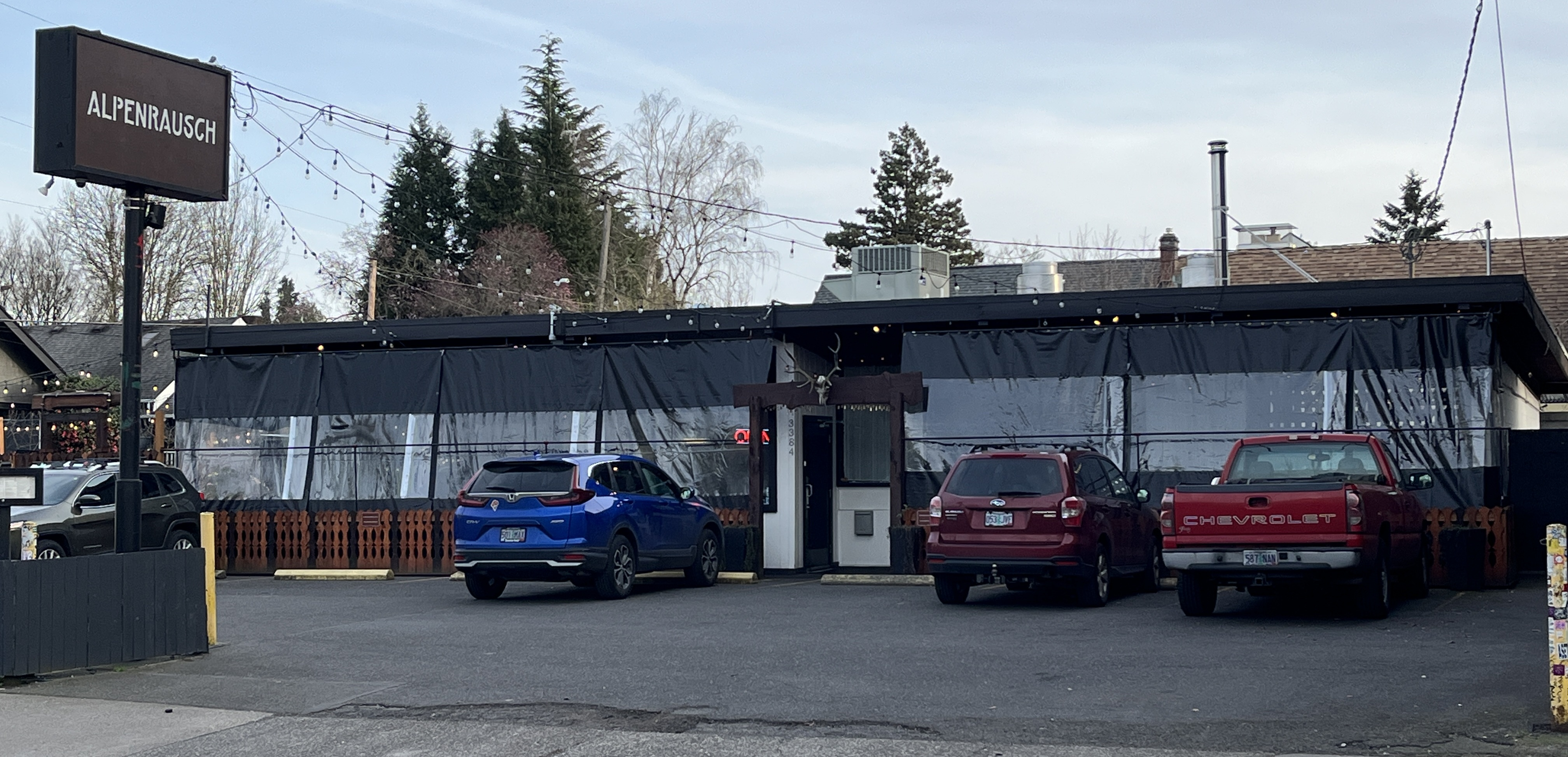
- The restaurant's exterior in 2025
- Interactive map of Alpenrausch

Restaurant information
- Established: November 16, 2023
- Closed: May 30, 2026
- Owner: Elias Cairo
- Food type: Swiss
- Dress code: Casual
- Location: 3384 Southeast Division Street, Portland, Multnomah, Oregon, 97202, United States
- Coordinates: 45°30′16.4″N 122°37′47.6″W
- Website: www.alpenrauschpdx.com

Alpenrausch was an Alpine restaurant in Portland, Oregon, United States, owned and operated by Olympia Provisions. It operated in southeast Portland's Richmond neighborhood, in a space that previously housed OP Wurst, later rebranded as Olympia Provisions Public House.

== Description ==
Alpenrausch was named after the "exhilaration of the mountains" and their new life. Michael Russell of The Oregonian described the restaurant as "sleek". Its patios had heaters and fire pits. Menu options included stews, schnitzels, and cheese fondue.

== History ==
Alpenrausch was established on November 16, 2023, by Olympia Provisions, at the intersection of Southeast Division Street and 34th Avenue. During Election Day in 2024, the restaurant offered half bottles of wine as part of their dinner service. The restaurant is slated to close on May 30, 2026, along with its patio Alpenhütte the next day.

== Reception ==
Alpenrausch was named one of the twenty best new restaurants of 2024 by Bon Appétit.

== See also ==
- List of defunct restaurants of the United States
