= Amaretto sour =

Cocktail drink

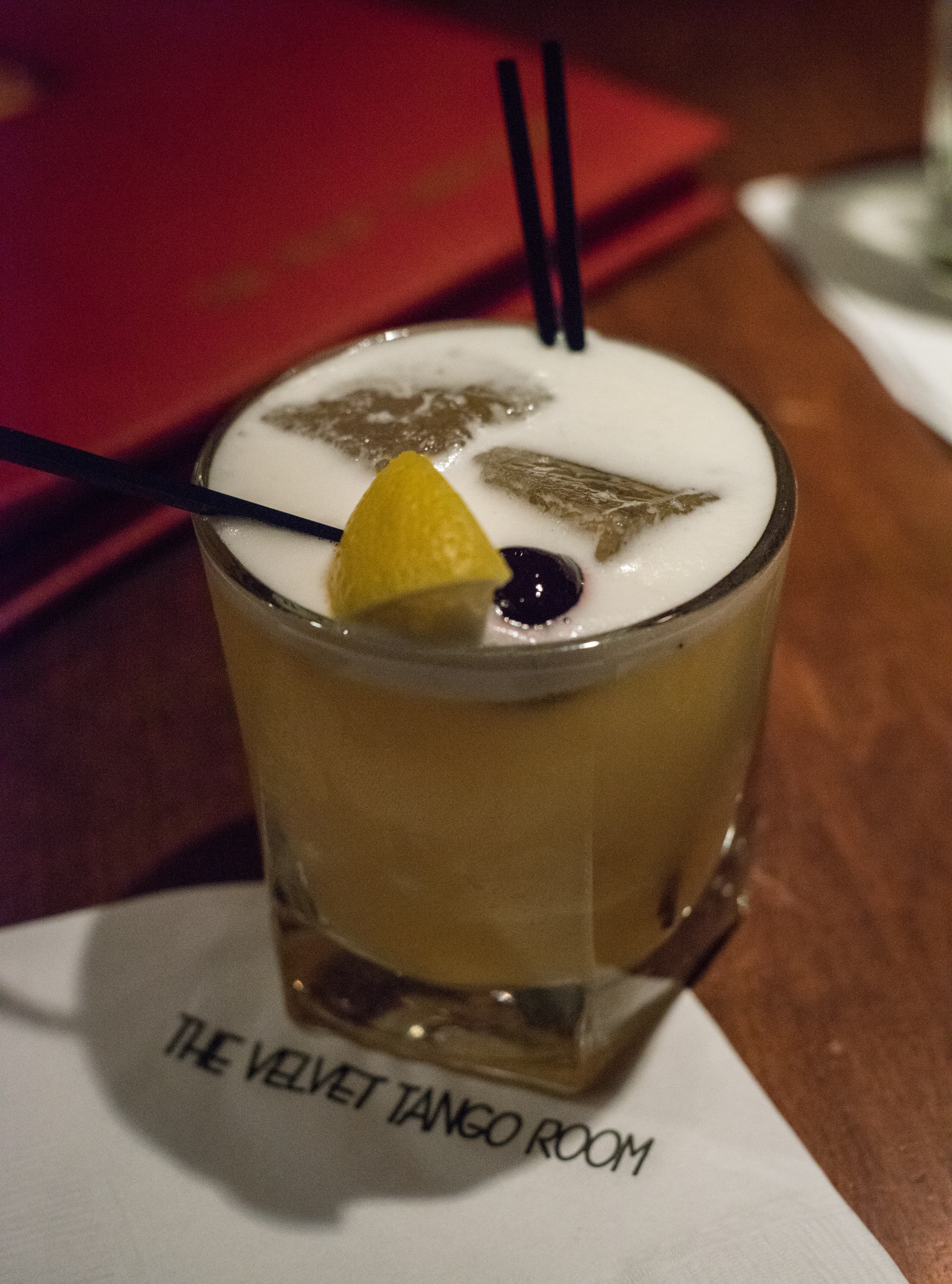
- A modern amaretto sour with an egg white foam
- Type: Cocktail
- Ingredients: 45 mL (1.5 US fl oz) amaretto; 90 mL (3.0 US fl oz) sour mix
- Standard drinkware: Old fashioned glass
- Standard garnish: Cherry, orange or lemon wedge
- Served: On the rocks: poured over ice
- Preparation: Mix and serve over ice

An amaretto sour is a cocktail using amaretto liqueur. It is a type of sour, a mixed drink made with a base spirit, citrus juice, and a sweetener. The drink is the most popular cocktail use for amaretto.

== Preparation ==
As described in Sardi's Bar Guide (1988), an amaretto sour can be made with one part amaretto liqueur to two parts sour mix. The drink is mixed, served over ice, and garnished with a cherry and an orange or lemon wedge.

Modern recipes may include two parts amaretto, one part lemon juice, and one egg white. The drink is shaken for five seconds without ice (a "dry shake"), shaken with ice for 15 seconds, and strained into a chilled old fashioned glass filled with ice. Cocktail cherries and Angostura bitters are added as a garnish.

== History ==
The cocktail was introduced to the public in 1974, devised by the importer of Amaretto di Saronno as a simple mix of two parts amaretto liqueur to one part lemon juice. It became a popular cocktail in the 1980s; most bartenders at the time substituted commercial sour mix for the lemon juice. The drink was popular as a one-dimensional easy-drinking cocktail, flavored mostly by the base spirit used.

Most recipes seen on modern cocktail menus include whipped egg white, bourbon, and lemon juice, to improve on its flavor. Imbibe attributes this change to bartender Jeffrey Morgenthaler, who published a new version of the drink in 2012 using cask-strength bourbon, rich simple syrup, and egg white.

== See also ==
- Pisco sour
- List of cocktails
