= German purity law =

German Purity Law may refer to:

- Nazi racial purity laws requiring 3/4 of grandparents to be German or related for citizenship: see Anti-Jewish legislation in prewar Nazi Germany
- Beer ingredients: see Reinheitsgebot
