= Rosenstadt =

Rosenstadt may refer to:

- Rosenstadt Brewery in Portland, Oregon, a brewery making German-style beers that follow Reinheitsgebot German purity law.
- Rosenstadt Rapperswil, Centre of fragrant roses in Rapperswil Rose Gardens
