= Clyde Hotel =

Historic building in Portland, Oregon, U.S.

- U.S. National Register of Historic Places
- Portland Historic Landmark
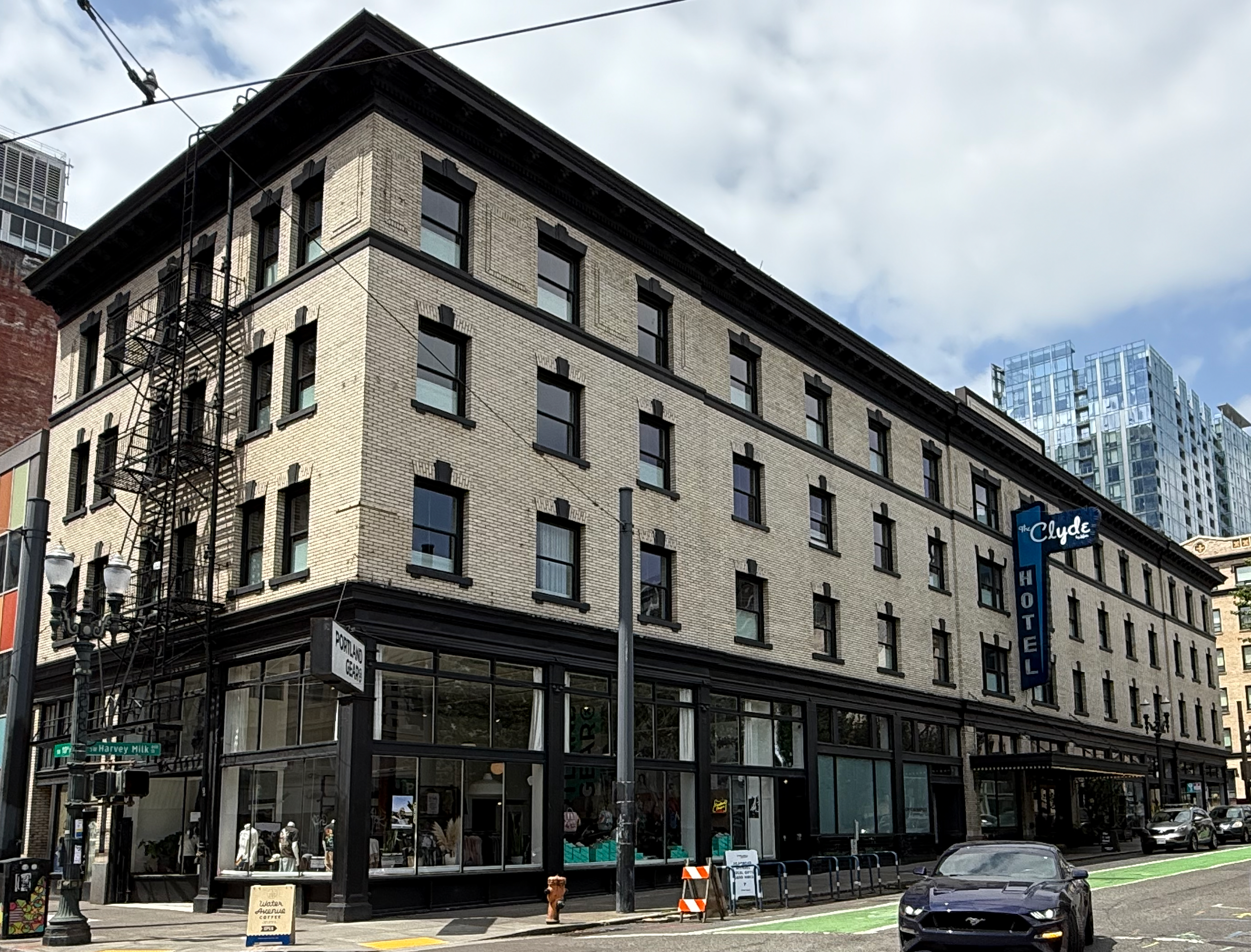
- The Clyde Hotel by Kasa

- Location within Portland, Oregon
- Location: 1000–1038 SW Harvey Milk Street (former Stark Street); Portland, Oregon
- Coordinates: 45°31′19″N 122°40′54″W
- Built: 1912
- Architect: MacNaughton and Raymond
- Architectural style: Early Commercial
- NRHP reference No.: 93001498
- Added to NRHP: January 21, 1994

The Clyde Hotel is a historic hotel located in the downtown area of Portland, Oregon, United States that first opened in 1912. It was renamed the Ben Stark Hotel in 1987, then became the Ace Hotel when it joined the Ace Hotel group in 2005. In June 2024 building ownership left the Ace Hotel group to partner with fellow hospitality company Kasa and renamed the hotel The Clyde Hotel Portland by Kasa, restoring the hotel’s original name.

== Featured in Film and TV ==
The Clyde Hotel was the site of the filming for Drugstore Cowboy, directed by Gus Van Sant and released in 1989.

While the Hotel was The Ace, it was referenced in a Portlandia sketch making a parody of downtown Portland Hotels, dubbing it "The Deuce" in episode 5 of season 1.

== National Register ==
The building was added to the National Register of Historic Places in 1994.

== See also ==
- Architecture in Portland, Oregon
- Clyde Common
