= Olympia Provisions Public House =

Defunct restaurant chain in the U.S. state of Oregon

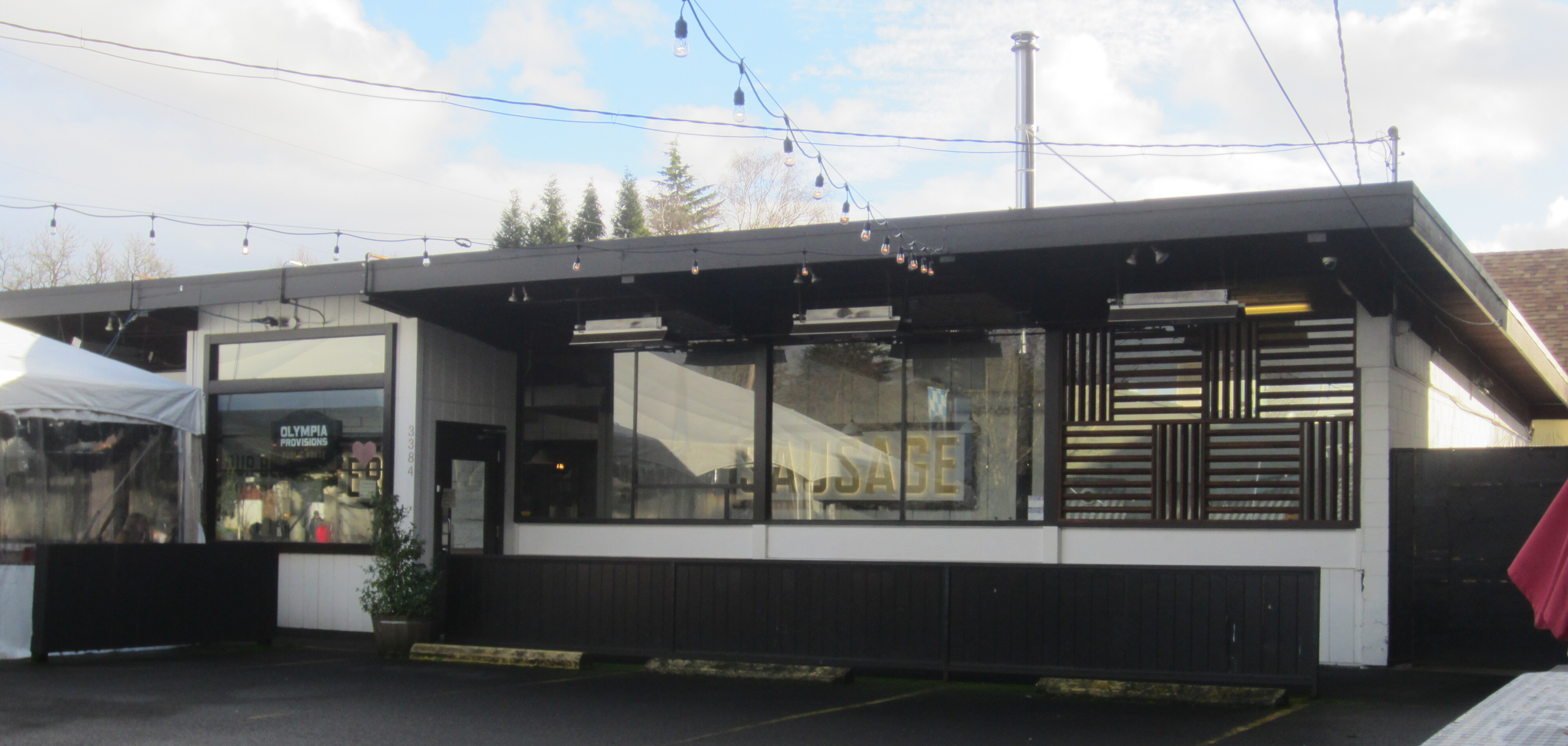
- Exterior of the restaurant on SE Division, 2021
- Interactive map of Olympia Provisions Public House

Restaurant information
- Owners: Elias Cairo; Michelle Cairo; Nate Tilden; Martin Schwartz
- Previous owner: Tyler Gaston
- Food type: German
- Dress code: Casual
- Location: 3384 SE Division Street, Portland, Multnomah County, Oregon, 97202, United States
- Coordinates: 45°30′16.4″N 122°37′47.6″W
- Website: olympiaprovisionspublichouse.com

Olympia Provisions Public House, formerly known as OP Wurst, was a public house in Portland, Oregon owned and operated by Olympia Provisions.

== History ==
In 2016, Olympia Provisions opened a small bar-restaurant in Pine Street Market called OP Wurst. The restaurant served artisan frankfurters, sausages, and beer. Later that year, the company opened a second OP Wurst location in Oregon City at Oregon City Brewing.

In March 2017, a third location opened on Division Street in Southeast Portland's Richmond neighborhood. The Division Street location was the first OP Wurst located in a stand-alone building. This third location was located in a building that formerly housed Honky Tonk Taco, an unrelated taco shop started by Olympia Provisions owners Tilden, Schwartz, and Gaston, that closed after being open for only three months. The location had an outdoor patio, which the bar-restaurant frequently used to host events such as Oktoberfest, and in the winter hosted a Christmas tree lot. It became known as Alpenrausch, which was named one of the twenty best new restaurants of 2024 by Bon Appétit.

In May 2018, OP Wurst temporarily closed its bars and rebranded as Olympia Provisions Public House. The new concept served Apline-themed food based on owner Elias Cairo's apprenticeship in Switzerland. The rebranding took place partially because customers did not recognize that OP Wurst was connected to the Olympia Provisions brand. Olympia Provisions Public House offered German-style beer from a local brewery, Rosenstadt Brewery, and served a home-base for the brewery's beer.

In October 2019, Olympia Provisions closed the public house location in Pine Street Market to focus on their wholesale business. During the COVID-19 pandemic, the restaurant expanded outdoor seating into the parking lot and operated a take-out service.

== Reception ==
Nathan Williams included Olympia Provisions Public House in Eater Portland's 2023 list of the city's "snappiest, juiciest" hot dogs.

== See also ==
- List of German restaurants
