= Commission v Germany (C-178/84) =

EU law case

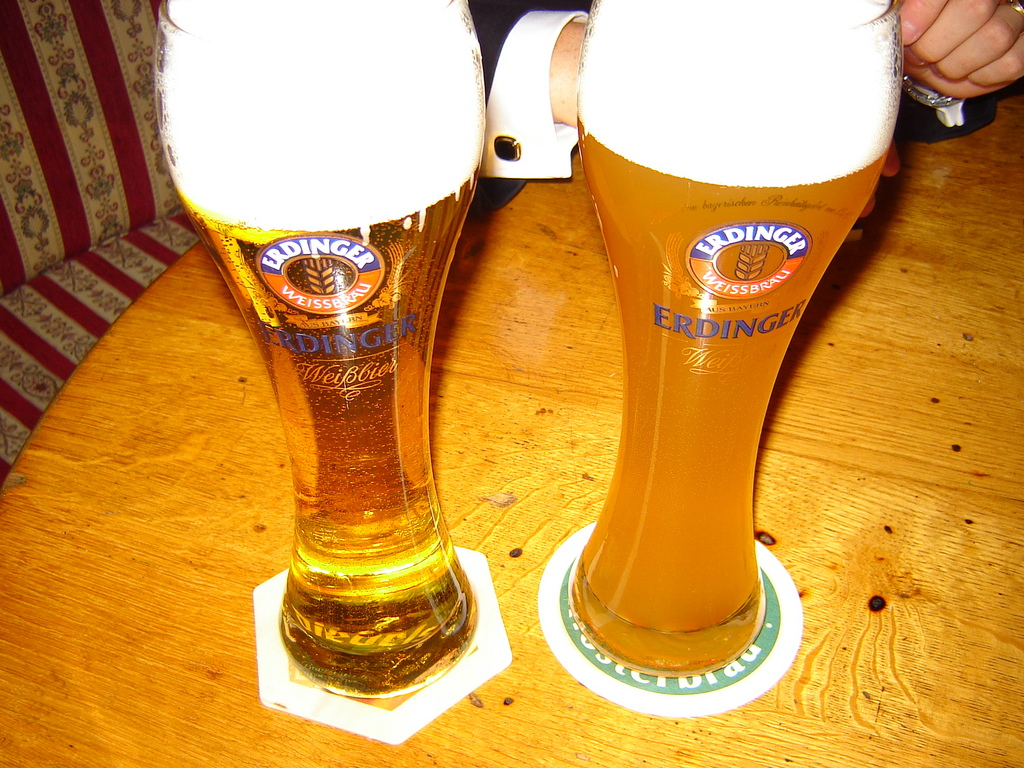
- German wheat beers (with "additives")
- Court: European Court of Justice
- Decided: 12 March 1987
- Citation: Case 178/84

Keywords
- Free movement of goods

Commission v Germany (1987) Case 178/84 is an EU law case, concerning the free movement of goods in the European Union.

== Facts ==
The Biersteuergesetz (Beer Tax Act, often referred to as the Reinheitsgebot or Beer Purity Law) originally from 1516, banned marketing of beer with any additives. It also reserved the name ‘Bier’ for malted barley, hops, yeast and water only. Maize and rice being used meant the product could not be called ‘Bier’. French brewers claimed the restrictions were protectionist to exclude imported beer. Germany argued that Germans drank a lot of beer, and long term effects of additives were unknown. Consumers were used to linking the word ‘Bier’ only to those products with the traditional ingredients.

== Judgment ==
ECJ held the rule could not be justified. It examined international scientific research and the EU’s scientific committee for food work, the codex alimentarius of the UN and the WHO and found that additives posed no risk to public health. Germany permitted additives in drinks other than beer, so its policy was inconsistent. TFEU art 110 case law was similar.

32 ... As the Court has already held in another context (Judgment of 27 February 1980 in Case 170/78 Commission v United Kingdom (1980) ECR 417, the legislation of a member state must not "crystallize given consumer habits so as to consolidate an advantage acquired by national industries concerned to comply with them."

[...]

36 Contrary to the German government's view, such a system of consumer information may operate perfectly well even in the case of a product which, like beer, is not necessarily supplied to consumers in bottles or in cans capable of bearing the appropriate details. That is borne out, once again, by the German legislation itself. Article 26(1) and (2) of the aforementioned regulation implementing the Biersteuergesetz provides for a system of consumer information in respect of certain beers, even where those beers are sold on draught, when the requisite information must appear on the casks or the beer taps.

[...]

48 As regards more specifically the harmfulness of additives, the German government, citing experts' reports, has referred to the risks inherent in the ingestion of additives in general. It maintains that it is important, for reasons of general preventive health protection, to minimize the quantity of additives ingested, and that it is particularly advisable to prohibit altogether their use in the manufacture of beer, a foodstuff consumed in considerable quantities by the German population.

49 However, it appears from the tables of additives authorized for use in the various foodstuffs submitted by the German government itself that some of the additives authorized in other member states for use in the manufacture of beer are also authorized under the German rules, in particular the Regulation on Additives, for the use in the manufacture of all, or virtually all, beverages. Mere reference to the potential risks of the ingestion of additives in general and to the fact that beer is a foodstuff consumed in large quantities does not suffice to justify the imposition of stricter rules in the case of beer.

== See also ==
- European Union law
