= Rosenstadt Brewery =

American brewery based in Portland, Oregon, U.S.

- Industry: Alcoholic beverage
- Founded: 2015 in Portland, Oregon, United States
- Founders: Tobias Hahn, Nick Greiner
- Headquarters: Portland, Oregon, United States
- Products: beer
- Owners: Tobias Hahn, Nick Greiner
- Website: www.rosenstadtbrewery.com

Rosenstadt Brewery is a brewery in Portland, Oregon, United States, making German-style beers that follow Reinheitsgebot German purity law.

== History ==
In 2013, Tobias Hahn and Nick Greiner met at the German American Society in Portland, where both had children in German language classes. An hour later, they ran into each other at a brewing supply store, and discovered that they both wanted to make German-style beer. Hahn grew up in Wiehre, Germany and studied microbiology at the University of Freiburg and wanted to bring traditional German beer to the United States. Eventually, Hahn and Greiner founded Rosenstadt Brewery in 2015, making beer that follows the traditional Reinheitsgebot German purity law. Rosenstadt does not have its own brewing facility or taproom, but has used other breweries' systems during down time. At first they experimented at Max's Fanno Creek Brew Pub in Tigard, Oregon, where they developed a Kölsch which became one of their signature beers. However, Max's Fanno Creek Brew Pub was not equipped for making German beer, so they had to find another facility. Primarily, they make their beer at Estacada's Fearless Brewing. They lager the beer at a storage facility. "Rosenstadt" is German for "Rose City", one of Portland's nicknames.

To sell their beer, Greiner and Hahn made cold calls to restaurants and bars. After four years, Rosenstadt had nearly 300 accounts and made specialty beers for certain customers, including Clyde Common. After its first full two years of production, Rosenstadt was one of the top 100 producers of beer in Oregon, based on volume.

In 2017, Rosenstadt received the Gold Award for the Altbier at the Oregon Beer Awards. In 2018, Olympia Provisions Public House rebranded to sell Alpine-themed food and drinks, and began selling seven Rosenstadt beers on tap. The public house has served as a home base for the beer company.

Rosenstadt later began bottling their beer. In 2020, The Oregonian named Rosenstadt one of Portland's top 20 breweries.
