= Jeffrey Morgenthaler =

American bartender and author

- Occupations: Bartender; writer

Jeffrey Morgenthaler is an American bartender and author. He worked for about a decade at Clyde Common and Pépé Le Moko in Portland, Oregon, until their closure in 2022, amid the COVID-19 pandemic. He opened a new bar, Pacific Standard, in June 2022.

Between Clyde Common and his own personal website, Morganthaler innovated in the cocktail industry and shared his results, making him and Clyde Common seen as one of the most influential for cocktails in the United States.

== Career ==
Jeffrey Morgenthaler's first management work was at Bamboo, an establishment in Eugene, Oregon. He proceeded to work at several restaurants in Eugene and moved to Portland in 2009 to take over Clyde Common's bar, where he also opened a basement bar, Pépé Le Moko.

Morgenthaler was responsible for popularizing barrel-aged cocktails beginning in 2010, and bottled carbonated cocktails beginning in 2011. Around 2012, he began creating craft cocktails that are upscale versions of the 1980s "disco-era" drinks. Morgenthaler is credited with the revival in popularity of the amaretto sour, after modernizing its recipe in 2012. His revision calls for bourbon, rich simple syrup, and egg white in addition to the original amaretto liqueur and lemon juice.

In 2022, Morgenthaler released a line of canned cocktails with Ninkasi Brewing Company. Clyde Common and Pépé Le Moko closed in January 2022, amid the COVID-19 pandemic, and so Morgenthaler opened a new bar, Pacific Standard, in June 2022.

== Works ==
- Morgenthaler, Jeffrey; Holmberg, Martha (2014). The Bar Book. Chronicle Books. ISBN 978-1-4521-1384-5.
- Morgenthaler, Jeffrey (2018). Drinking Distilled: A User's Manual. Clarkson Potter/Ten Speed. ISBN 9780399580550.

== See also ==
- List of bartenders
