= Red Oak Brewery =

Brewing company in North Carolina

- Type: Brewery
- Location: Whitsett, North Carolina, United States
- Coordinates: 36°03′43″N 79°34′14″W
- Opened: 1991
- Annual production volume: 23,000 US beer barrels (27,000 hl) in 2015
- Website: redoakbrewery.com

Active beers
Name	Type
Red Oak	Amber Lager
Hummin' Bird	Helles Lager

Seasonal beers
Name	Type
Old Oak	Oktoberfest Lager
1516	Heller Bock
Black Oak	Double Bock
Big Oak	Vienna Lager
Red Oak HopGarten	Bavarian Pils

Other beers
Name	Type
Battlefield Bock	Bock

Red Oak Brewery is a brewing company in Whitsett, North Carolina. Originally started as a brewpub in Greensboro, NC, Red Oak produces only unfiltered, unpasteurized Bavarian Style lagers. Red Oak beer is only distributed in North Carolina.

Unlike most beer brands, Red Oak is self distributed.

== History ==
In February 1991, the Red Oak brewpub was opened in Greensboro. As the beer grew in popularity and distribution, production needs exceeded the brewpub’s capacity. In summer 2007 the new modern computerized brewery was opened in the nearby community of Whitsett and the brewpub closed. Today, it claims to be the largest craft lager-only brewery in the United States.

The brewery began bottling 12-packs of beer in late 2009 after a $1 million expansion, including a new bottling line. The brewery is capable of producing 60,000 barrels a year.

In December 2017, the Red Oak Brewery opened their Lager Haus & Biergarten next to their brewery.

== German influence ==
All Red Oak beer is made according to the 1516 Bavarian Purity Law known as the Reinheitsgebot. The beer is unfiltered, unpasteurized and without preservatives. Red Oak kegs in European sizes- measured by the liter.

== Products ==
- Red Oak (flagship, amber lager)
- Battlefield Bock
- Hummin' Bird (Helles lager)
- Big Oak (Spring Seasonal Vienna Style Bockbier)
- Old Oak (Fall Seasonal Oktoberfest Style)
- Black Oak (Winter Seasonal Double Bock)
- 1516 (Heller Bock)
- Red Oak HopGarten Bavarian Pils)
- White Oak ([India Pale Lager|IPL])
