= Rudy's Barbershop =

American barbershop

- Industry: Barber
- Founded: 1993; 32 years ago in Seattle, Washington, United States
- Founders: Alex Calderwood; David Petersen; Wade Weigel

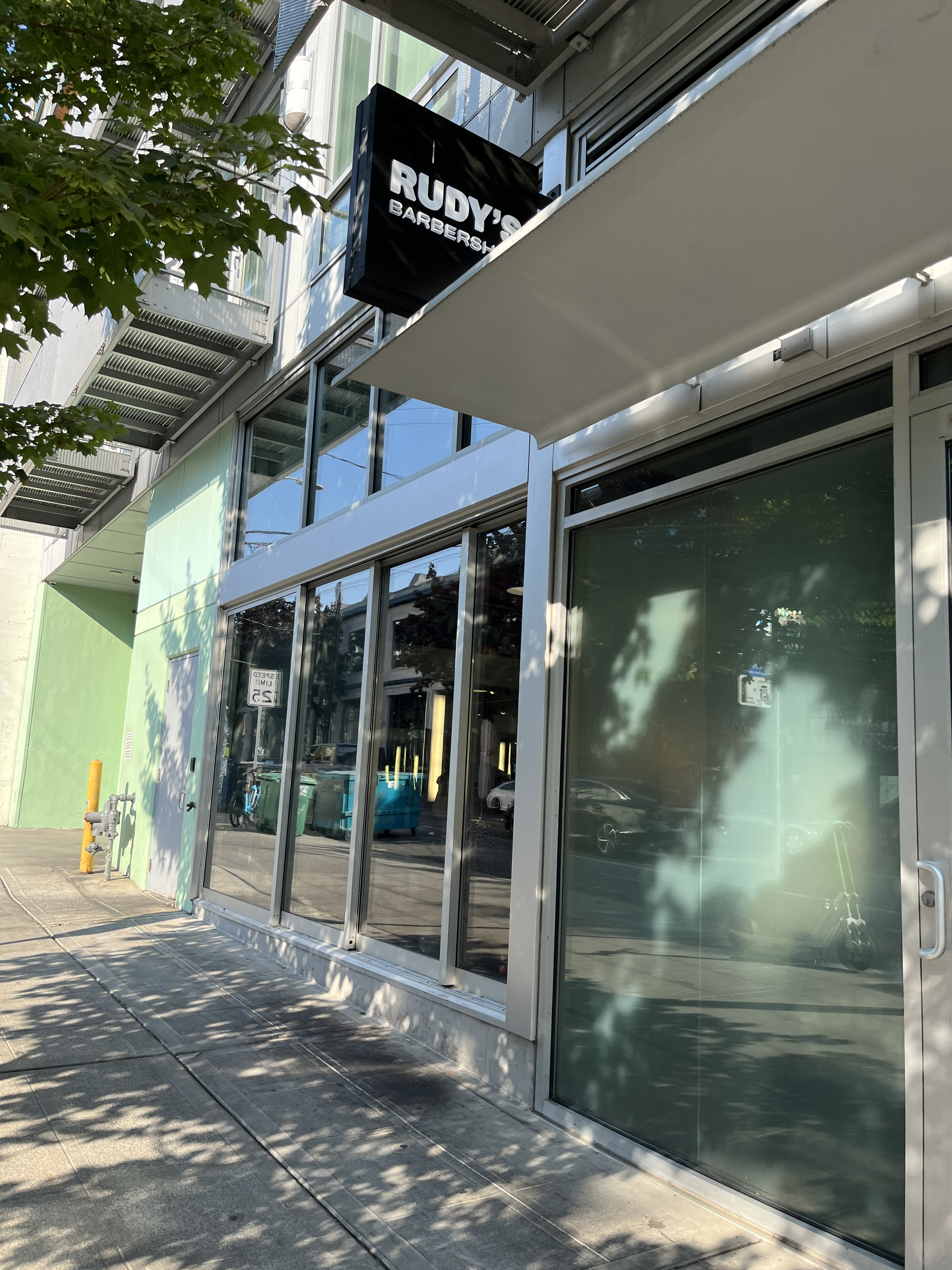
Exterior of a shop in Seattle in 2024

Rudy's Barbershop is a chain of barbershops founded in Seattle, Washington by Alex Calderwood, David Petersen and Wade Weigel in 1993, with locations primarily on the United States West Coast. Calderwood and Weigel would later go on to also co-found the Ace Hotel group in 1999. Rudy's Barbershops are known for their casual, retro-hip aesthetic and can be found at Ace Hotel locations in Seattle and New York City.

== History ==
Alex Calderwood, was inspired by his occasional visits to Sig's, a neighborhood barbershop. He was seeking to combine the traditional neighborhood barbershop experience with trendier hairstyles that would appeal to a younger clientele. Calderwood, along with partners Weigel and Petersen, opened the first Rudy's location in Seattle's Capitol Hill neighborhood in 1993.

The name Rudy's was inspired by the character of the same name from the television program Fat Albert and the Cosby Kids.

By 2003, the Rudy's Barbershop chain had expanded to eight properties - four additional Seattle locations, plus two shops in Los Angeles and two in Portland, Oregon. By 2018, there were twenty-seven Rudy's Barbershop locations throughout the United States.

Rudy's was purchased by Sortis Holdings in 2020.
