= Olympic Cereal Mill =

Historic building complex in Portland, Oregon, U.S.

- U.S. National Register of Historic Places
- Portland Historic Landmark
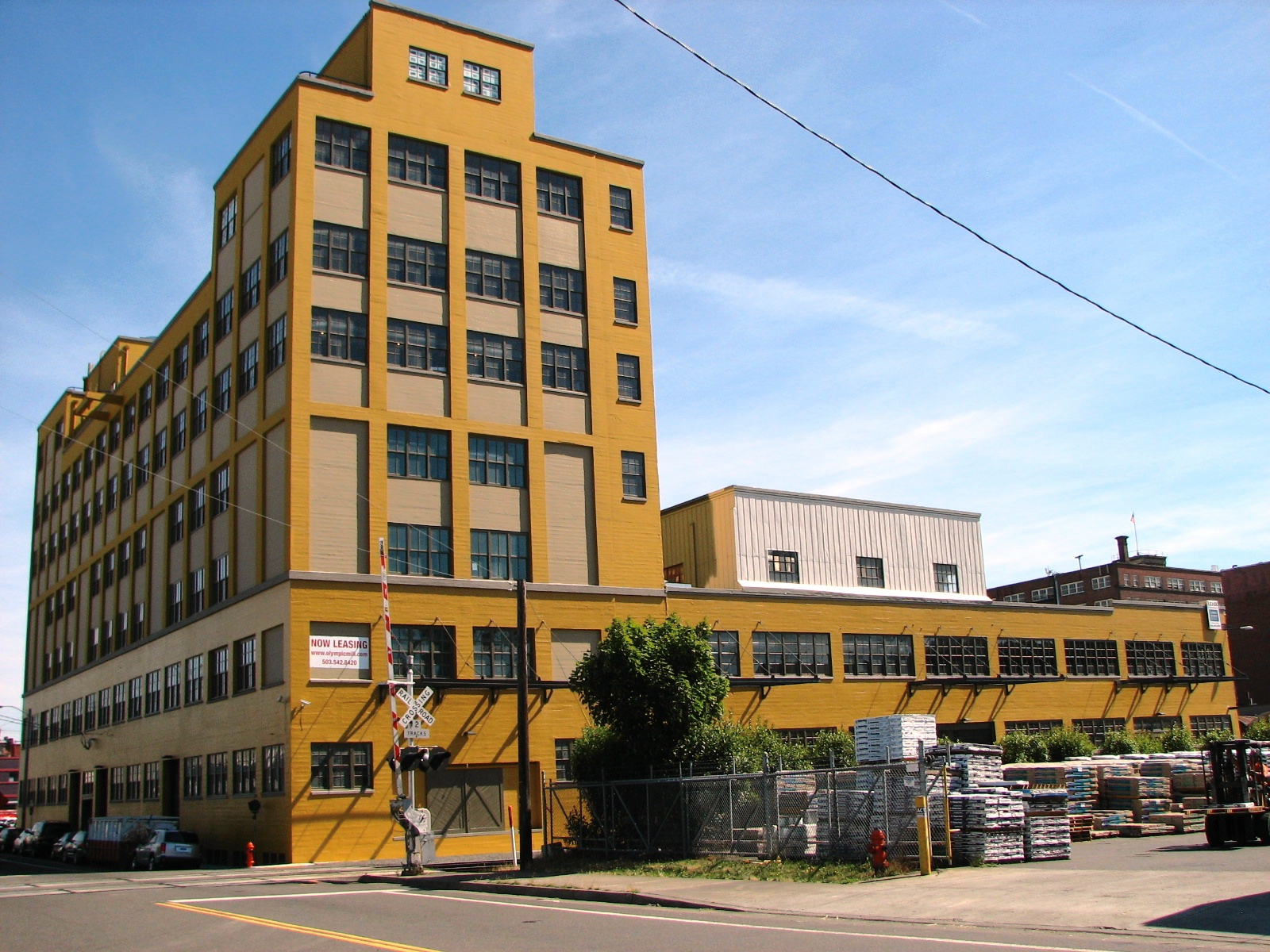
- Olympic Cereal Mill in 2008

- Location within Portland, Oregon
- Location: 107 SE Washington Street; Portland, Oregon
- Coordinates: 45°31′09″N 122°39′51″W
- Area: 172,000 sq ft
- Built: 1906
- Architect: Hurley–Mason Co.
- MPS: Portland Eastside MPS
- NRHP reference No.: 89000115
- Added to NRHP: March 8, 1989

The Olympic Cereal Mill, formerly known as B&O Warehouse, is a building complex in southeast Portland, Oregon, listed on the National Register of Historic Places. The building is currently a creative space.

In 2004, the building was purchased by Beam Development and was then recycled into the building it is today and placed on the National Register of Historic Places.

== Tenants ==
The building has about one hundred tenants, which consist of startups in addition to well-established businesses.

== See also ==
- National Register of Historic Places listings in Southeast Portland, Oregon
