= Reinheitsgebot =

Rules for manufacturing German beer

The Reinheitsgebot (German pronunciation: [ˈʁaɪnhaɪtsɡəˌboːt]; lit. 'purity order') is a series of regulations limiting the ingredients in beer in Germany and the states of the former Holy Roman Empire. The best known version of the law was adopted in Bavaria in 1516 (by William IV), but similar regulations predate the Bavarian order, and modern regulations also significantly differ from the 1516 Bavarian version. Although today the Reinheitsgebot is mentioned in various texts about the history of beer, historically it was only applied in the duchy, electorate, then Kingdom of Bavaria and from 1906 in Germany as a whole, and it had little or no effect in other countries or regions. However, Norway adopted a similar law in 1912.

== 1516 Bavarian law ==
The most influential predecessor of the modern Reinheitsgebot was a law first adopted in the Duchy of Bavaria-Munich in 1487. After Bavaria was reunited, the Munich law was adopted across the entirety of Bavaria on 23 April 1516. As Germany unified, Bavaria pushed for adoption of this law on a national basis (see § Broader adoption).

=== Ingredients permitted ===
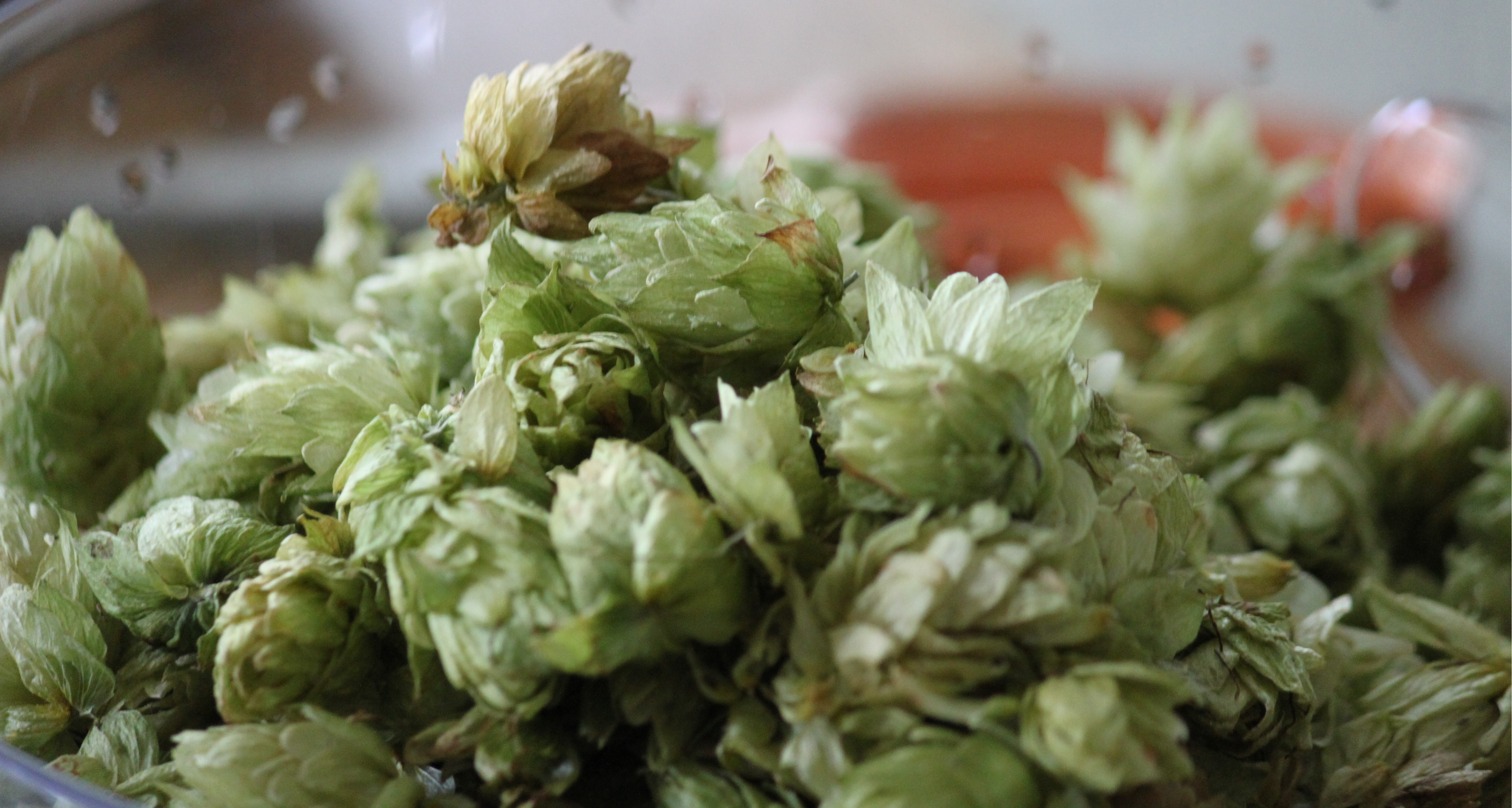
Hops

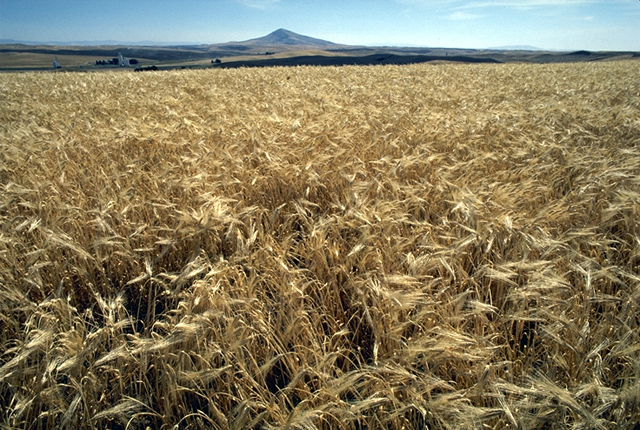
A field of barley

According to the 1516 Bavarian law, the only ingredients that could be used in the production of beer were water, barley and hops. The text does not mention yeast as an ingredient, although yeast was at the time knowingly used in the brewing process. It is likely that brewers of the time preferred to see yeast as a fixture of the brewing process. Yeast produced in one batch was commonly transferred to a subsequent batch, thus giving yeast a more permanent character in the brewing process. A full understanding of the chemical basis of yeast and the fermentation process did not come until much later.

=== Other regulations ===
The 1516 Bavarian law set the price of beer (depending on the time of year and type of beer), limited the profits made by innkeepers, and made confiscation the penalty for making impure beer.

=== Text ===
The text (translated) of the 1516 Bavarian law is as follows:

We hereby proclaim and decree, by Authority of our Province, that henceforth in the Duchy of Bavaria, in the country as well as in the cities and marketplaces, the following rules apply to the sale of beer:

From Michaelmas to Georgi, the price for one Mass [1,069 ml, 1.881 imp pt] or one Kopf [bowl-shaped container for fluids, not quite one Mass], is not to exceed one Pfennig Munich value, and

From Georgi to Michaelmas, the Mass shall not be sold for more than two Pfennig of the same value, the Kopf not more than three Heller [one Heller usually equals one-half Pfennig].

If this not be adhered to, the punishment stated below shall be administered.

Should any person brew, or otherwise have, other beer than March beer, it is not to be sold any higher than one Pfennig per Mass.

Furthermore, we wish to emphasize that in future in all cities, market-towns and in the country, the only ingredients used for the brewing of beer must be Barley, Hops and Water. Whosoever knowingly disregards or transgresses upon this ordinance, shall be punished by the Court authorities' confiscating such barrels of beer, without fail.

Should, however, an innkeeper in the country, city or market-towns buy two or three pails of beer (containing 60 Mass) and sell it again to the common peasantry, he alone shall be permitted to charge one Heller more for the Mass or the Kopf, than mentioned above. Furthermore, should there arise a scarcity and subsequent price increase of the barley (also considering that the times of harvest differ, due to location), WE, the Bavarian Duchy, shall have the right to order curtailments for the good of all concerned.

— Bavarian Reinheitsgebot of 1516 (emphasis added) Eden, Karl J. (1993). "History of German Brewing". Zymurgy. 16 (4).

== Purpose, significance, and effect ==
=== Purpose ===
The Bavarian order of 1516 was introduced in part to prevent price competition with bakers for wheat and rye. The restriction of grains to barley was meant to ensure the availability of affordable bread, as wheat and rye were reserved for use by bakers.

Although the Reinheitsgebot is a Bavarian law which explicitly excludes the use of wheat for beer brewing, wheat beers are prevalent in Bavaria. This is because the aristocratic Degenberger family received a special, exclusive right from Duke Wilhelm IV, who enacted the Reinheitsgebot, to brew and sell wheat beer, a favorite of the royal court. Eventually, the brewing privilege was leased out to private brewers starting in 1802. In 1872, Georg Schneider was commissioned to open a weissbier brewery, and his family still operates it today.

The rule may have also had a protectionist role, as beers from Northern Germany often contained additives that could not be grown in Bavaria.

Religious conservatism may have also played a role in adoption of the rule in Bavaria, to suppress the use of plants that were allegedly used in pagan rituals, such as gruit, henbane, belladonna, or wormwood. The rule also excluded problematic methods of preserving beer, such as soot, stinging nettle and henbane.

=== Significance and continuity ===
While some sources refer to the Bavarian law of 1516 as the first law regulating food safety, this is inaccurate, as earlier food safety regulations can be traced back as far as ancient Rome. Similarly, some sources claim that the law has been essentially unchanged since its adoption, but as early as the mid-1500s Bavaria began to allow ingredients such as coriander, bay leaf, and wheat. Yeast was also added to modern versions of the law after the discovery of its role in fermentation.

The Reinheitsgebot remains the most famous law that regulates the brewing of beer, and continues to influence brewing not only in Germany, but around the world. Many sources have described the Reinheitsgebot as the earliest extant instance of a consumer protection law.

=== Effect on beer diversity in Germany ===
Modern versions of the law have contained significant exceptions for different types of beer (such as top-fermented beers), for export beers, and for different regions. The basic law now declares that only malted barley/wheat/rye, hops, water and yeast are permitted. The Reinheitsgebot strictly forbids the use of extenders such as rice, maize, sorghum and other grains favored by American brewers to give a lighter taste as well as being less expensive to brew.

In response to the growth of craft breweries globally, some commentators, German brewers, and even German politicians have argued that the Reinheitsgebot has slowed Germany's adoption of beer trends popular in the rest of the world, such as Belgian lambics and American craft styles. In late 2015, Bavarian brewers voted in favor of a revision to the beer laws to allow other natural ingredients. Many brewers still follow the original 1516 purity law as it is considered to be a part of the national identity.

== History ==
Until the mid-20th century, the Reinheitsgebot was relatively unknown and applied unevenly across Germany. In the mid-20th century, Bavarian brewers rallied around the Reinheitsgebot to protect themselves against competition amid European market integration.

=== Predecessors ===
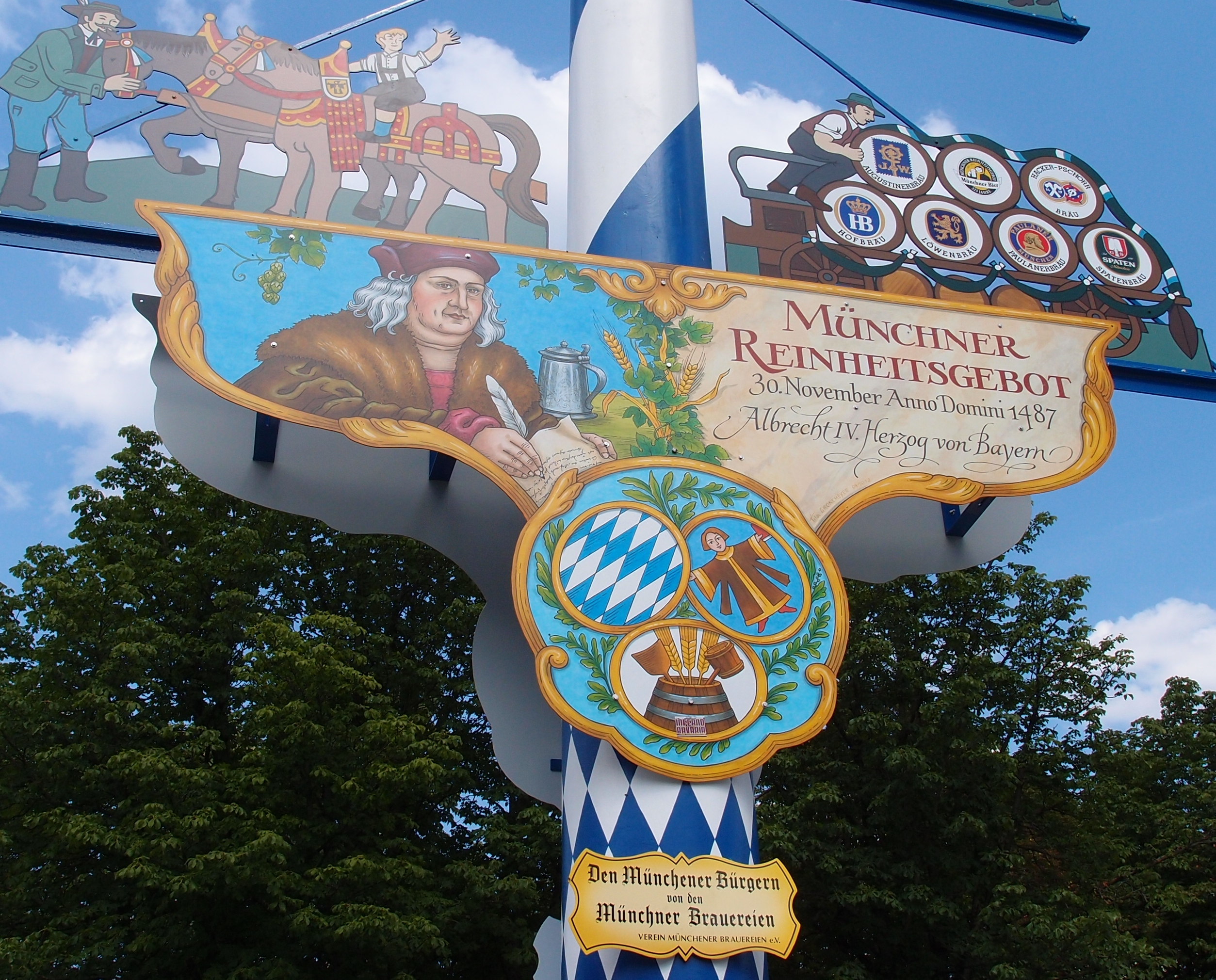
Sign celebrating the 1487 Munich Reinheitsgebot

The earliest documented mention of beer by a German nobleman is the granting of a brewing licence by Emperor Otto II to the church at Liege (now in Belgium), awarded in 974. A variety of other beer regulations also existed in Germany during the late Middle Ages, including in Nuremberg in 1293, Erfurt in 1351, and Weißensee in 1434.

=== Broader adoption ===
The Bavarian order of 1516 formed the basis of rules that spread slowly throughout Germany. Bavaria insisted on its application throughout Germany as a precondition of German unification in 1871. The move encountered strong resistance from brewers outside Bavaria, and imperial law of 1873 taxed the use of other ingredients (rather than banning them) when used by Northern German brewers. It was not until 1906 that the law was applied consistently across all of Germany, and it was not formally referred to as Reinheitsgebot until the Weimar Republic.

In 1952, the basic regulations of the Reinheitsgebot were incorporated into the West German Biersteuergesetz (Beer Taxation Law). Bavarian law remained stricter than that of the rest of the country, leading to legal conflict during the 1950s and early 1960s. The law initially applied only to bottom-fermented ("lager") beers, but brewers of other types of beer soon accepted the law as well.

Outside of Germany, the Reinheitsgebot was formally incorporated in Greek law by the first Greek king, Otto (originally a Bavarian prince). German brewers at the Tsingtao Brewery in the German colony in Qingdao, China also followed the law voluntarily.

=== Modern changes ===
In March 1987 French brewers sued and, in the case of Commission v Germany (C-178/84), the European Court of Justice found that the Reinheitsgebot was protectionist, and therefore in violation of Article 30 of the Treaty of Rome. This ruling concerned only imported beer, so Germany chose to continue to apply the law to beer brewed in Germany. (Greece's version of the Reinheitsgebot was struck down around the same time.) General food safety and labeling laws may also apply.

After German reunification in 1990 the Neuzeller Kloster Brewery, a former monastery brewery in the East German town of Neuzelle, Brandenburg, was warned to stop selling its black beer as it contained sugar. After some negotiations the brewery was allowed to sell it under the name Schwarzer Abt ("Black Abbot") but could not label it 'Bier'. This decision was repealed by the Federal Administrative Court of Germany through a special permit, and after legal disputes lasting ten years (known as the "Brandenburg Beer War") Neuzeller Kloster Brewery gained the right to call Schwarzer Abt 'Bier' again.

The revised Vorläufiges Biergesetz (Provisional Beer Law) of 1993, which replaced the earlier regulations, is a slightly expanded version of the Reinheitsgebot, stipulating that only water, malted barley, hops and yeast be used for any bottom-fermented beer brewed in Germany. In addition, the law allows the use of powdered or ground hops and hop extracts, as well as stabilization and fining agents such as PVPP. Top-fermented beer is subject to the same rules, with the addition that a wider variety of malted grains can be used, as well as pure sugars for flavor and coloring.

The law's applicability was further limited by a court ruling in 2005, which allowed the sale of beer with different ingredients as long as it was not labeled "beer". The law thus became a labeling standard.

Exceptions to the current rules can be sought, and have been granted to allow gluten-free beer to be labeled as beer despite the use of different ingredients.

== Use in beer marketing ==
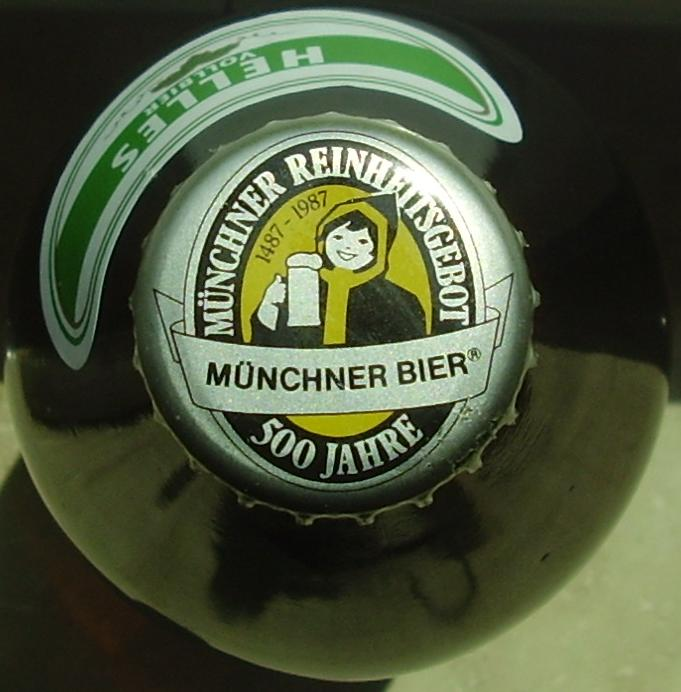
Some German brewers continue to use the word Reinheitsgebot in labeling and marketing.

Because of strong German consumer preferences, labeling beer as being compliant with Reinheitsgebot is believed to be a valuable marketing tool in Germany. German brewers have used the law to market German beer internationally, including a failed attempt to have the law added to the UNESCO list of intangible cultural heritages. Breweries in Norway often follow the same rules as in the Reinheitsgebot. Some breweries outside Germany also claim to be compliant with the Reinheitsgebot as part of their marketing, such as:

- Bierstadt Lagerhaus in Denver, Colorado
- WEST Brewery in Glasgow, Scotland
- Kloud in Korea
- Gordon Biersch in California
- Red Oak Brewery in Whitsett, North Carolina
- Olde Mecklenburg Brewery in Charlotte, North Carolina
- Schulz Bräu in Knoxville, Tennessee
- Namibia Breweries in Windhoek, Namibia
- Rosenstadt Brewery in Portland, Oregon
- Penn Brewery in Pittsburgh, Pennsylvania
- Bitte Schön Brauhaus in New Hamburg, Ontario
- Steam Whistle Brewing in Toronto, Ontario
- Okanagan Spring Brewery in Vernon, British Columbia
- New Glarus Brewing Company in New Glarus, Wisconsin
- Bohemian Brewery in Salt Lake City, Utah
- Chinggis Beer in Mongolia
- Eisenbahn in Brazil
- Brewery Becker in Brighton, Michigan
- Bierkeller Brewing Company in Columbia, South Carolina
- Cedar Springs Brewing in Cedar Springs, Michigan
- Küsterer Brauhaus in Grand Rapids, Michigan

For some vegans the Reinheitsgebot can be seen as a strong indication that the beer marked as such is vegan. This is in absence of legislation in the UK and elsewhere which require beers to be labelled with all their ingredients and nutritional information.

== See also ==
- Beer in Germany
- List of brewing companies in Germany
