= Clyde Common =

Restaurant in Portland, Oregon, U.S.

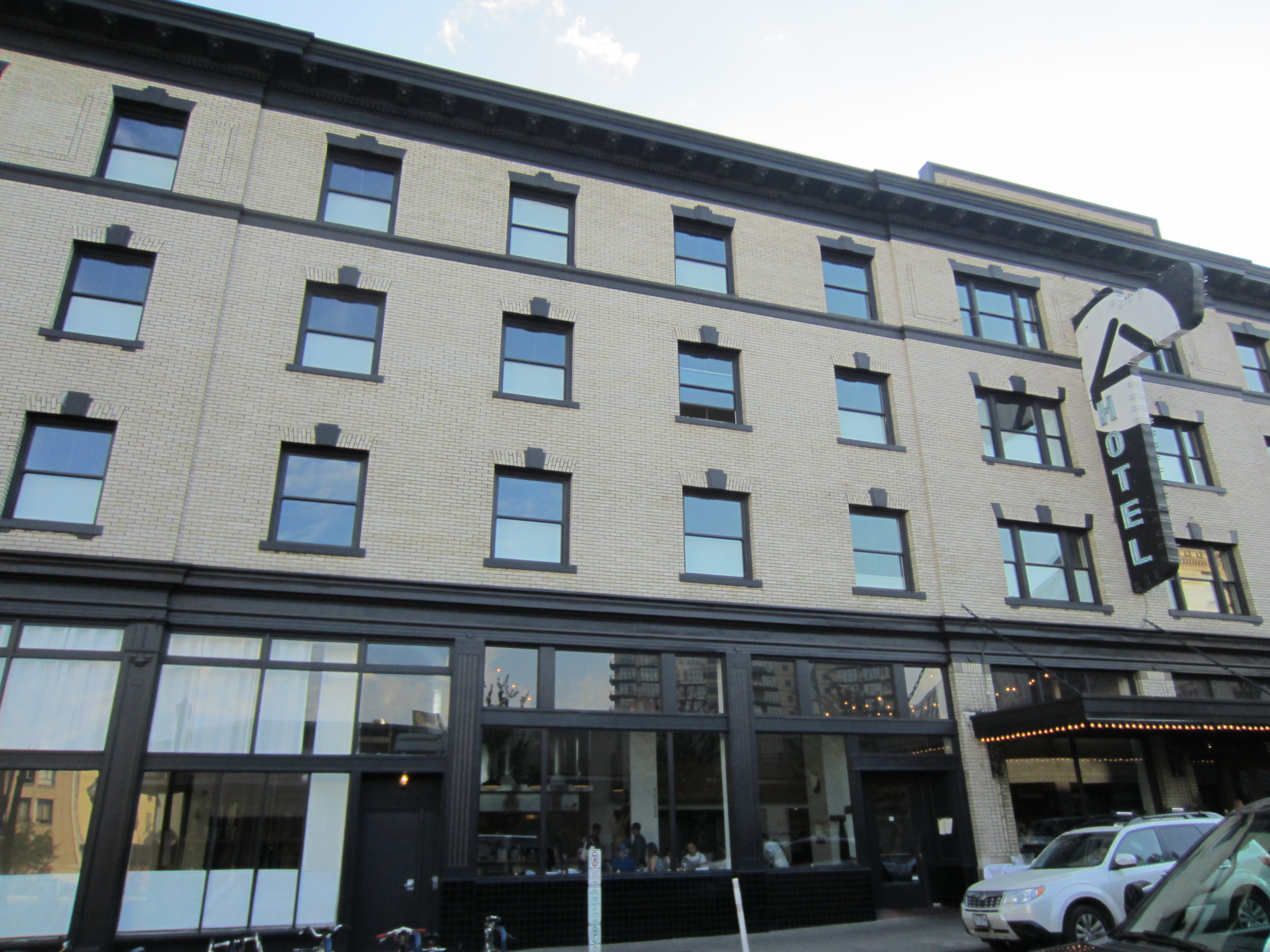
- The restaurant's exterior in the Clyde Hotel building then operated by Ace Hotel, in 2012
- Interactive map of Clyde Common

Restaurant information
- Established: 2007
- Closed: January 2022
- Owners: Matt Piacentini; Nate Tilden
- Head chef: Carlo Lamagna
- Location: 1014 SW Harvey Milk Street, Portland, Multnomah, Oregon, 97205, United States
- Coordinates: 45.522000°N 122.681601°W
- Website: clydecommon.com

Clyde Common was a restaurant and market in Portland, Oregon, United States. The business opened in 2007. In 2020, Clyde Common closed temporarily due to the COVID-19 pandemic, reopening in July with outdoor dining and as a market. The bar and restaurant became known as Clyde Tavern, and the part of the former dining area was called Common Market. Clyde Common closed permanently in January 2022.

The restaurant's bar, as led by Jeffrey Morgenthaler, was influential in its creations and helped lead the craft cocktail movement.

== Description and history ==
Matt Piacentini and Nate Tilden were co-owners. They opened the restaurant in the ground floor of the Clyde Hotel (then known as the Ace Hotel as part of the Ace Hotel group) in downtown Portland in 2007. Tilden also owns part of the restaurant and meat company Olympia Provisions. In May 2014, Carlo Lamagna replaced Johnny Leach as head chef.

In 2020, the restaurant closed temporarily during the COVID-19 pandemic. Clyde Common re-opened in July with outdoor seating and as a market. Chis DiMinno served as executive chef.

Clyde Common closed permanently in January 2022. Submarine Hospitality is slated to open Stone's Throw in the space in early 2024.

== Reception ==
Clyde Common was a semifinalist in the James Beard Foundation Award's Outstanding Bar category in 2012, 2013, and 2015, and a finalist in the same category in 2014 and each year from 2016 to 2018. The restaurant was included in The Oregonian's 2017 list of Portland's best restaurants. In late 2018, Brian Panganiban of Willamette Week said, "This downtown stalwart is still a hub for good food and a prime place for people watching... Clyde remains quintessential Portland cool." Joe Streckert included Clyde Common in Portland Mercury's 2019 list of "100 Portland Happy Hours: Downtown".

== See also ==
- COVID-19 pandemic in Portland, Oregon
- Impact of the COVID-19 pandemic on the restaurant industry in the United States
