= Olympia Provisions =

- Formerly: Olympic Provisions, OP Wurst
- Industry: Charcuterie, restaurant
- Founded: December 1, 2009 in Portland, United States
- Founders: Elias Cairo; Michelle Cairo; Tyler Gaston; Nate Tilden; Martin Schwartz
- Headquarters: 123 Southeast 2nd Ave, Portland, Oregon, United States
- Number of locations: 5 restaurants, 1 production plant
- Area served: United States
- Products: Charcuterie, salami, sausages, cured meats, ham, bacon, pickles
- Owners: Elias Cairo; Michelle Cairo; Nate Tilden; Martin Schwartz
- Website: www.olympiaprovisions.com

Olympia Provisions (formerly Olympic Provisions) is an American meat and restaurant company that produces artisan charcuterie based in Portland, Oregon.

== Background and history ==
Founded in 2009 as Olympic Provisions, the company began as Oregon's first USDA salumeria in a 900 square foot production facility attached to a European-inspired restaurant in the Olympic Cereal Mill building. The owners came from a variety of backgrounds, with Nate Tilden also co-owning Clyde Common and Elias Cairo having background as a chef and first generation Greek-American. The idea began when Elias Cairo decided he wanted to open a meat plant inside of a restaurant, and he gathered a group of cofounders which included his sister Michelle, Tilden, Martin Schwartz, and Tyler Gaston. Nate Tilden and Elias Cairo worked together at Castagna prior to opening Olympia Provisions, where Cairo served as head chef. The company began by selling their salami exclusively at farmers' markets and in their restaurant. After receiving nationwide recognition they needed to expand their production facility to meet their demand. In April 2011, Olympia Provisions opened a second restaurant alongside a 4,000 square foot production facility. Two years later, Olympia Provisions had outgrown its second production facility, and in February 2014 production moved to a 34,000 square foot building two blocks from the Southeast restaurant.

=== Name change ===
In September 2014, the company received a cease and desist notice from the International Olympic Committee, which holds the trademark for the word "olympic" in order to "protect Olympic corporate sponsors against dilution of the value". The company had performed a name search and an LLC search when they first opened, but no trademark issue arose during their research. Originally named after the Olympic Cereal Mill building which housed its first restaurant and production facility, the company agreed to a deal which allowed them to phase out and rebrand to Olympia Provisions throughout 2015.

== Restaurants ==
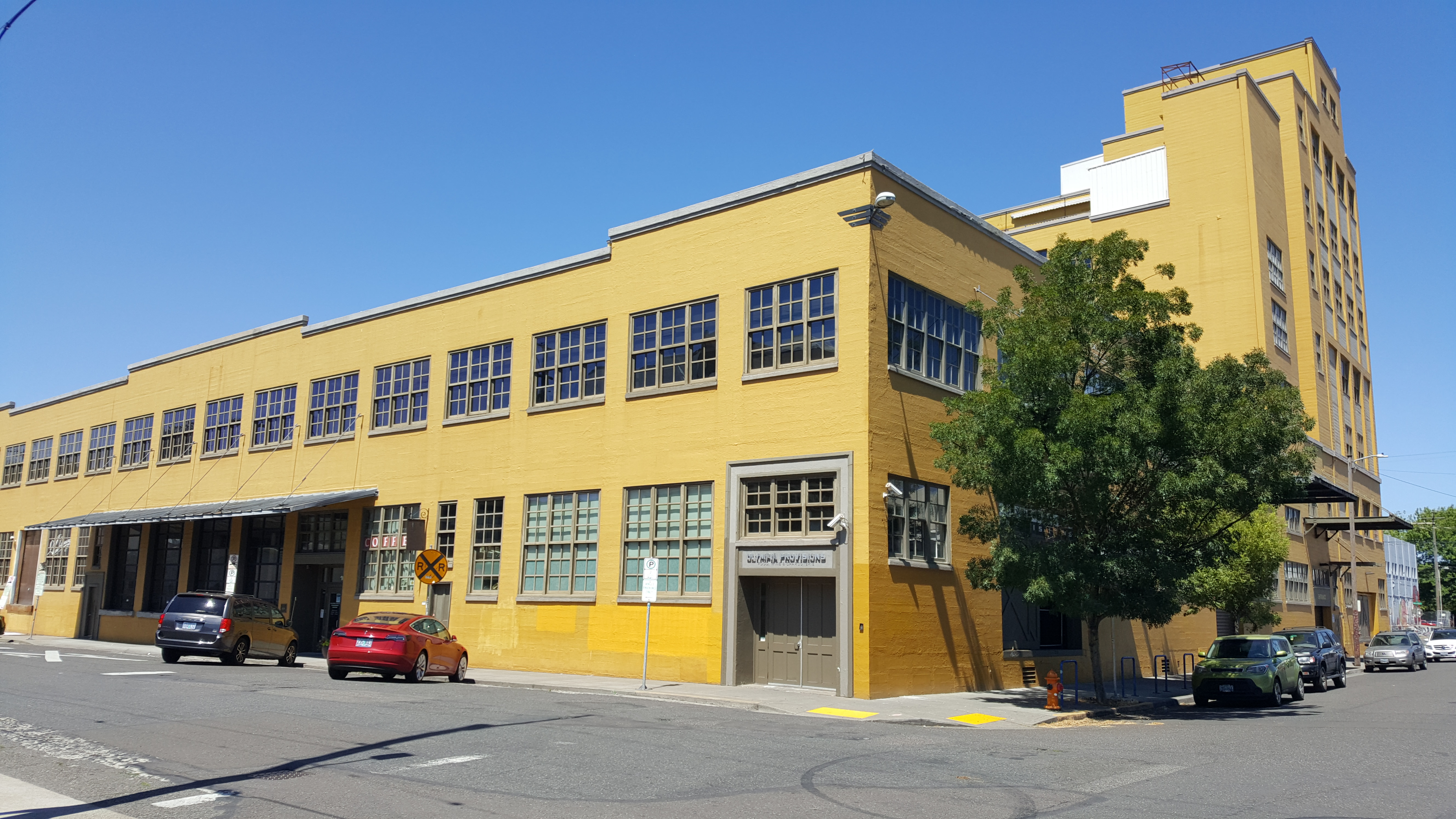
Exterior of Olympia Provisions Southeast, 2020

The company currently owns two European-style restaurants in Portland which share the company name. They are known as Olympia Provisions Southeast and Olympia Provisions Northwest. The first restaurant opened in 2009 in Southeast Portland. Their second restaurant opened in April 2011 in Northwest Portland. In 2018, restaurant manager and sommelier, Jessica Hereth, was named as one of Food and Wine magazine's Sommeliers of the Year.

=== Olympia Provisions Public House ===
In early 2016, Olympia Provisions opened a small bar-restaurant called OP Wurst, located in Pine Street Market. The restaurant focused on frankfurters, sausages, and beer. Later that year, they opened another OP Wurst in Oregon City at Oregon City Brewing. In March 2017, a third location, and the first OP Wurst located in a stand-alone building, opened on Division Street in Southeast Portland. This third location replaced Honky Tonk Taco, an unrelated taco shop started by Olympia Provisions owners Tilden, Schwartz, and Gaston, which had closed after only three months. The location has an outdoor patio, which the bar-restaurant frequently uses to host events, and in the winter hosts a Christmas tree lot. OP Wurst was rebranded as Olympia Provisions Public House in May 2018, which serves food based on owner Elias Cairo's apprenticeship in Switzerland. This was partially because customers did not recognize that OP Wurst was connected to the Olympia Provisions brand.

=== Melty and Meaty Sandwich Eatery ===
On May 4, 2018, Olympia Provisions and Tillamook Cheese collaborated and opened a food truck in Pioneer Courthouse Square in Downtown Portland. The truck sells six types of grilled cheese sandwiches using Olympia Provisions' meat and Tillamook's cheeses.

== Cookbook ==
Olympia Provisions released its first cookbook on October 27, 2015. The book was written by owner Elias Cairo and co-author Meredith Erickson . It was published by Ten Speed Press. The book follows Cairo through Switzerland, where he completed his apprenticeship as a young adult, and includes recipes from the restaurants, the meat plant and his time in Switzerland. It is split into two parts, with one part focusing on meats and another part focusing on recipes from the Olympia Provisions restaurants.

== Reception ==
Michael Russell ranked Olympia Provisions number 9 in The Oregonian's 2025 list of Portland's 40 best restaurants. Katherine Chew Hamilton and Brooke Jackson-Glidden included Olympia Provisions in Eater Portland's 2025 list of the city's best restaurants and food cart pods for large groups.

Olympia Provisions has won fifteen Good Food Awards, and at one time had more than any other entrant.

In December 2025, a consumer reported finding metal in their ready-to-eat kielbasa sausages. About 2,000 lbs of Olympia Provisions' products were recalled for possible contamination with metals. In May 2022, Olympia Provisions products were recalled for having pistachio, a tree nut allergen that is required by law to be labeled. They also had a recall for undeclared pistachios in August 2019.

Year	Nominated work	Category	Award	Result	Notes	Ref.
2011	Loukanika	Charcuterie	Good Food Award	Won		
2011	Saucisson d'Arles	Charcuterie	Good Food Award	Won		
2011	Pork Liver Mousse	Charcuterie	Good Food Award	Won		
2011	Pickled Corno di Toro Peppers	Pickles	Good Food Award	Won		
2011	Saveur 100		Saveur 100	Won		
2012	Chorizo Navarre	Charcuterie	Good Food Award	Won		
2013	Lomo Di Parma	Charcuterie	Good Food Award	Won		
2014	Pickled Corno di Toro Peppers	Charcuterie	Good Food Award	Won		
2014	Oprah's Favorite Things		Oprah's Favorite Things	Won		
2015	Salami Cotto	Charcuterie	Good Food Award	Won		
2015	Salami Etna	Charcuterie	Good Food Award	Won		
2016	Rigani Loukaniko	Charcuterie	Good Food Award	Won		
2017	Landrauchschinken	Charcuterie	Good Food Award	Won		
2018	Salami El Rey	Charcuterie	Good Food Award	Won		
2018	Sommelier of the Year		Food & Wine	Won	This award was given to Jessica Hereth	
2019	Saucisson Sec	Charcuterie	Good Food Award	Won		
2019	Saucisson Aux Noisettes de Oregon	Charcuterie	Good Food Award	Won		
2019	Green Peppercorn Pate	Charcuterie	Good Food Award	Won		
2020	Rosette de Oregon	Charcuterie	Good Food Award	Won		
2020	Chorizo Rioja	Charcuterie	Good Food Award	Won		
2020	Salami Capri	Charcuterie	Good Food Award	Won		
