= Ace Hotel =

Hotel group

- Type: Private
- Industry: Hospitality
- Founded: 1999; 27 years ago
- Founder: Alex Calderwood; Wade Weigel; Doug Herrick
- Headquarters: Los Angeles, California; New York City, New York
- Number of locations: 9
- Area served: North America, Japan, Australia, Greece
- Key people: Brad Wilson (president)
- Parent: Prince Hotels, Seibu Holdings, Seibu Group
- Website: www.acehotel.com

Ace Hotel is a chain of hotels headquartered in Los Angeles and New York City. Founded in 1999 in Seattle, it operates hotels internationally on four continents, with locations in Manhattan and Brooklyn, New York City; Palm Springs, California; Seattle, Washington; Kyoto, Japan; Toronto, Canada; Sydney, Australia and Athens, Greece, with a hotel soon to open in Fukuoka, Japan.

== History ==
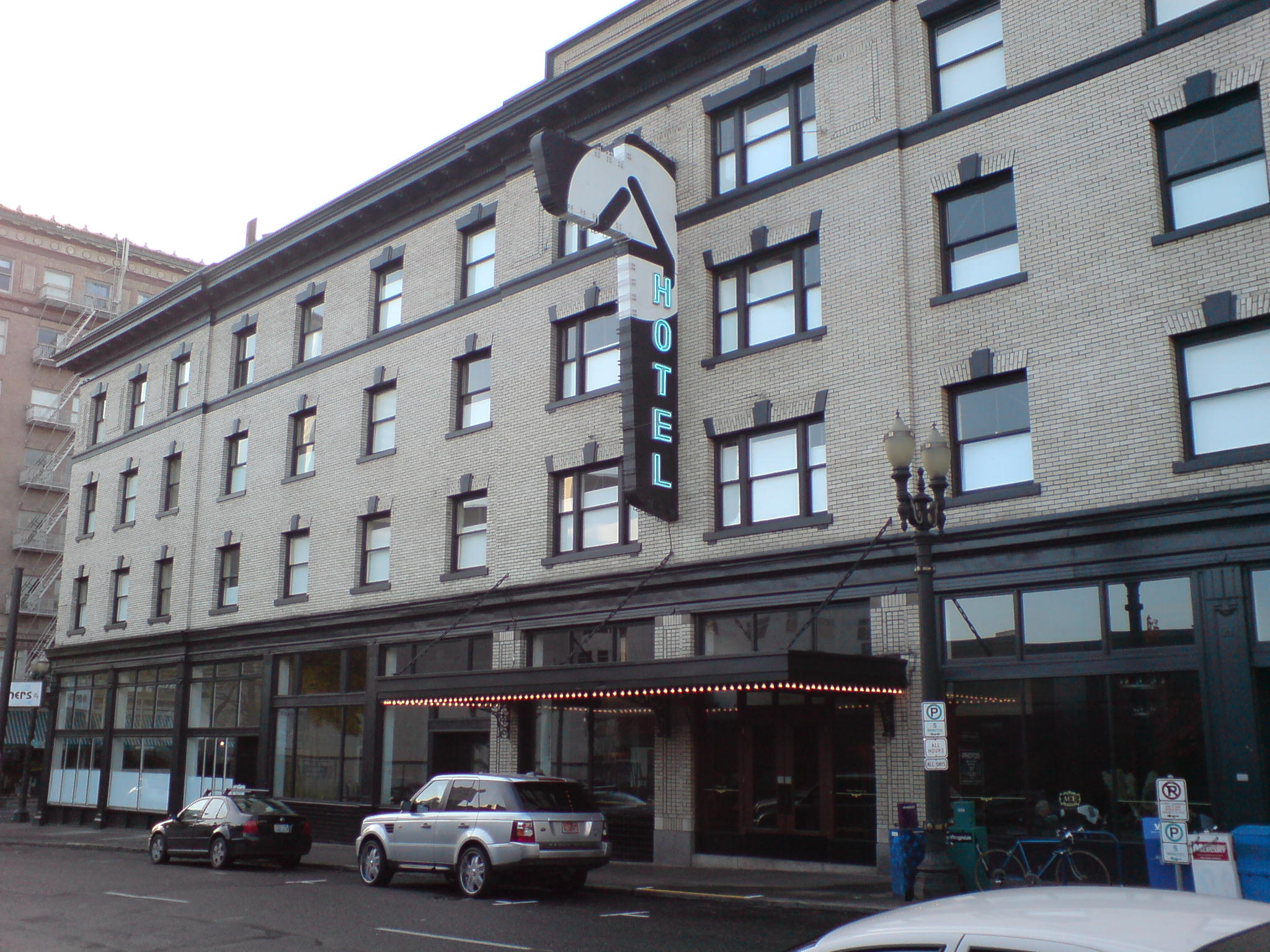
Former Ace Hotel Portland (now The Clyde Hotel by Kasa Living)

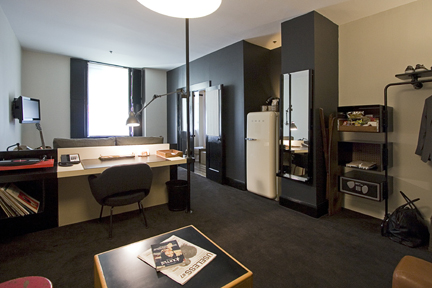
Guest room at Ace Hotel New York

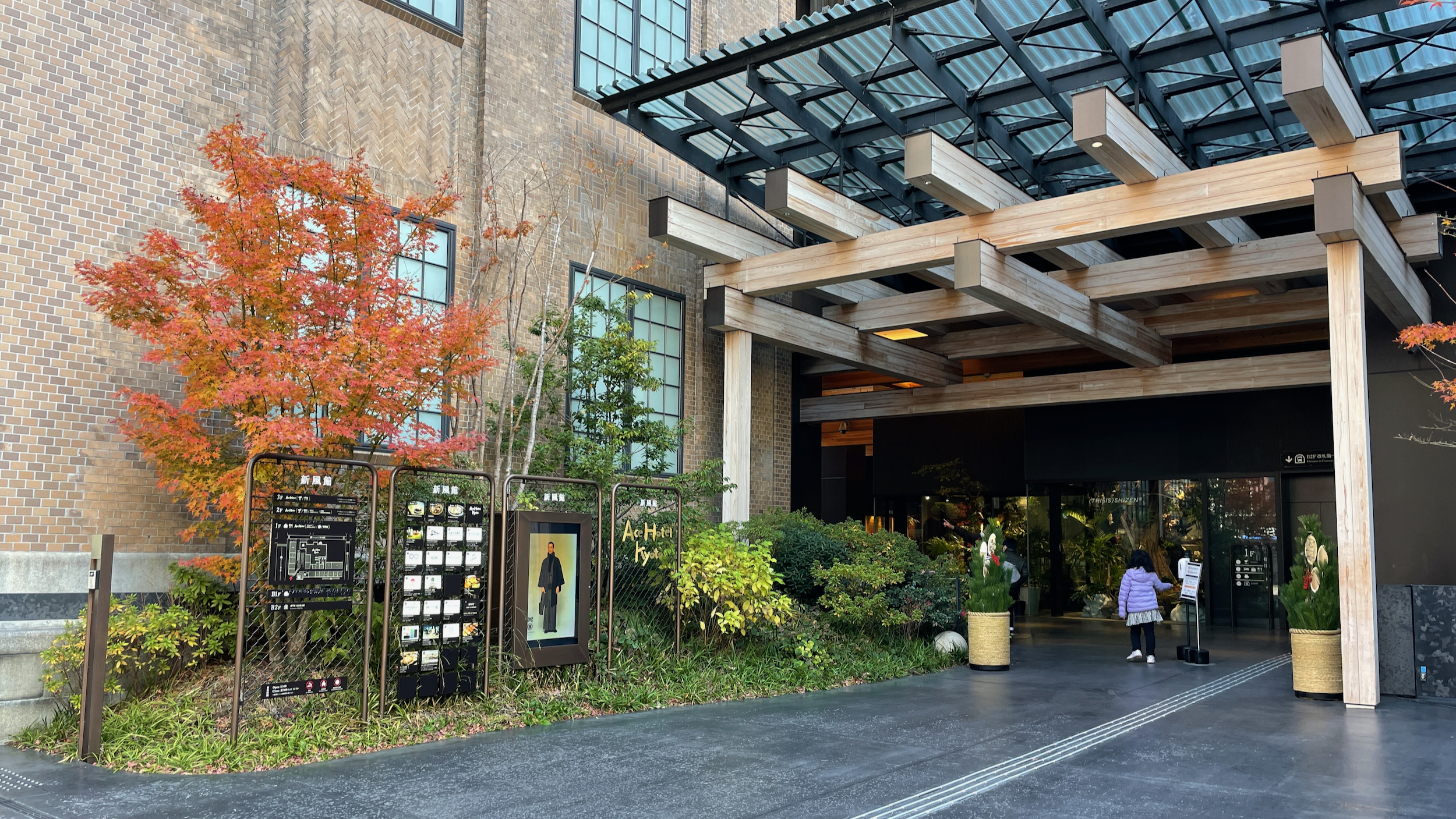
Ace Hotel Kyoto

In 1999, the first Ace Hotel was opened in Seattle. Friends Alex Calderwood, Wade Weigel, and Doug Herrick purchased a halfway house and transformed it into an affordable hotel that would appeal to the creative class. Calderwood and Weigel had previously founded Rudy's, a reinvigorated traditional barbershop concept, in Seattle, which eventually expanded to more than a dozen locations. They also founded the experiential marketing company Neverstop, and the audiovisual arts platform ARO.Space with Pearl Jam co-founder Stone Gossard and Kung Faux creator Mic Neumann, who is credited for bringing in such artists as Kaws and Shepard Fairey to decorate the walls of various Rudy's and Ace Hotel locations.

In 2006, the group opened a second hotel in Portland, Oregon, followed by properties in Palm Springs, California, and New York City, in 2009.

Kelly Sawdon was a Partner and Chief Brand Officer at Ace Hotel from 2007 to 2020, overseeing the brand's global creative vision, strategic partnerships, and the direction of Atelier Ace, the in-house creative studio.

In 2013, an Ace Hotel opened in the Shoreditch neighborhood of London, where Calderwood had defined a goal of opening a new Ace Hotel every "one to two years", before his death at age 47 on November 16, 2013.

In 2014, a downtown Los Angeles location of the Ace Hotel opened in a former theatre, followed by locations in Pittsburgh in 2015, New Orleans in 2016, and Chicago in 2017.

In 2020, an Ace Hotel location opened in Kyoto, Japan that was designed by Kengo Kuma. In September 2020, it was announced that Ace Hotel London Shoreditch would not reopen after closing due to the COVID-19 pandemic.

In 2021, Ace Hotel opened a second New York City location, in Brooklyn, and in 2022 it debuted new properties in Toronto, Canada and Sydney, Australia.

In November 2024, a new location debuted in Athens, Greece.

In September 2025, Ace Group International, with its eight-property portfolio and in-house design studio Atelier Ace, was acquired by Japan's Seibu Prince Hotels Worldwide for $90 million.

== Locations ==
According to Calderwood, the style and furnishing of each Ace property are designed to reflect its location, with an eye towards re-imagining properties that are "challenged."

- Ace Hotel & Swim Club Athens
- Ace Hotel Brooklyn
- Ace Hotel Kyoto opened on June 11, 2020, in a building originally designed by Tetsuro Yoshida for the Kyoto Central Telephone Company in 1926. The registered Taishō era property was redesigned by Kengo Kuma.
- Ace Hotel New York worked with Roman and Williams to redesign the former Hotel Breslin, a 1904 building in Midtown Manhattan.
- Ace Hotel & Swim Club in Palm Springs, CA is a converted Howard Johnson's motel, formerly a Westward Ho. King's Highway, the hotel's on-site diner, is a converted Denny's. There are two bars, the Amigo Room, and poolside, the Short Bus. The remodel was a collaboration with L.A.-based design firm Commune.
- Ace Hotel Seattle is a former Salvation Army halfway house located in the Belltown neighborhood.
- Ace Hotel Sydney
- Ace Hotel Toronto

Under development:

- Ace Hotel Fukuoka is expected to open in 2027.

Former locations:

- The American Trade Hotel is a restored five-story stucco building in the Casco Viejo historical district of Panama City. It debuted in 2013 and was associated with Ace Hotels for a number of years after its opening.
- Ace Hotel Chicago closed in 2021.
- Ace Hotel London was in London's Shoreditch arts district, on the site of the original Shoreditch Empire music hall. The group's first Ace-branded location outside the US, Ace Hotel London Shoreditch closed in September 2020.
- Ace Hotel Downtown Los Angeles opened in January 2014 in the historic United Artists Building, with 180 rooms and a restored United Artists Theater performance venue. It closed in 2024.
- Ace Hotel New Orleans opened in March 2016 in a 1928 Art Deco building in New Orleans' Warehouse District. It closed in 2024.
- Ace Hotel Pittsburgh opened in an historic YMCA building in the city's East Liberty neighborhood in December 2015, and closed in 2021 where the hotel joined Kasa and became The Maverick by Kasa.
- Ace Hotel Portland opened in 2006 at the former Clyde Hotel in downtown Portland. In its former incarnation, the hotel's lobby served as the setting for a scene from the film Drugstore Cowboy. The property is listed on the National Register of Historic Places. The hotel left Ace in 2024 to join the Kasa hotel group, and became the Clyde Hotel by Kasa.

== In popular culture ==
The 2011 episode "Blunderbuss" of the sketch comedy series Portlandia had a sketch set at the "Deuce Hotel", where the obnoxiously hip staff hand out complimentary turntables and typewriters to all guests; it was a parody specifically of Ace Hotel Portland.

Rapper Noname mentions the Ace Hotel in London in her 2018 song "Ace."

Bon Iver makes a reference to the Ace Hotel Los Angeles in the song "33 "GOD"" on the album 22, A Million.
