= Sour mix =

Yellow-green mixer used in cocktails

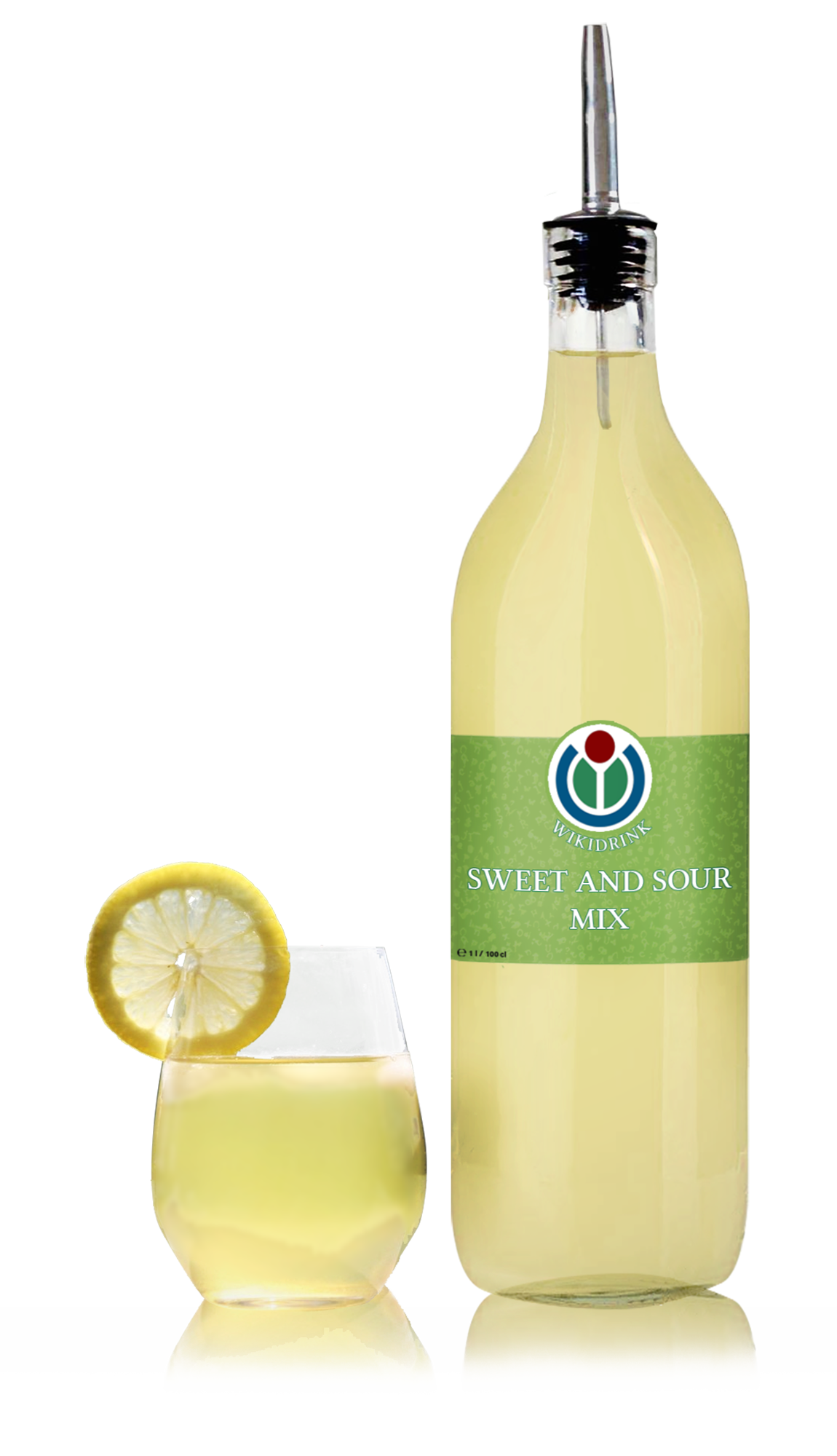
A generic bar bottle of sour mix, served with a lemon wheel

A sour mix (also known as a sweet-and-sour mix) is a non-alcoholic drink mixer used to provide a set mix of acidic and sweet components to cocktails. While a traditional recipe consists of lemon and/or lime juice mixed with equal parts simple syrup, prepackaged commercial varieties can vary and often contain artificial flavors, colors, and/or preservatives. The primary purpose of sour mix is to simplify beverage making by replacing two separate ingredients (a sweetener and a sour citrus juice) with a single, pre-blended ingredient.

A sour mix can be mixed with liquor(s) to make a sour drink; the most common are vodka sour (vodka) and whiskey sour (whiskey). It may also be served neat or with juice, club soda, etc., as a soft drink.

Pre-mixed versions are available and are used in many bars. These typically consist of a powder that must be rehydrated by adding water before use.

== See also ==
- List of cocktails
- Tom Collins
