= Haitian cuisine =

Culinary tradition

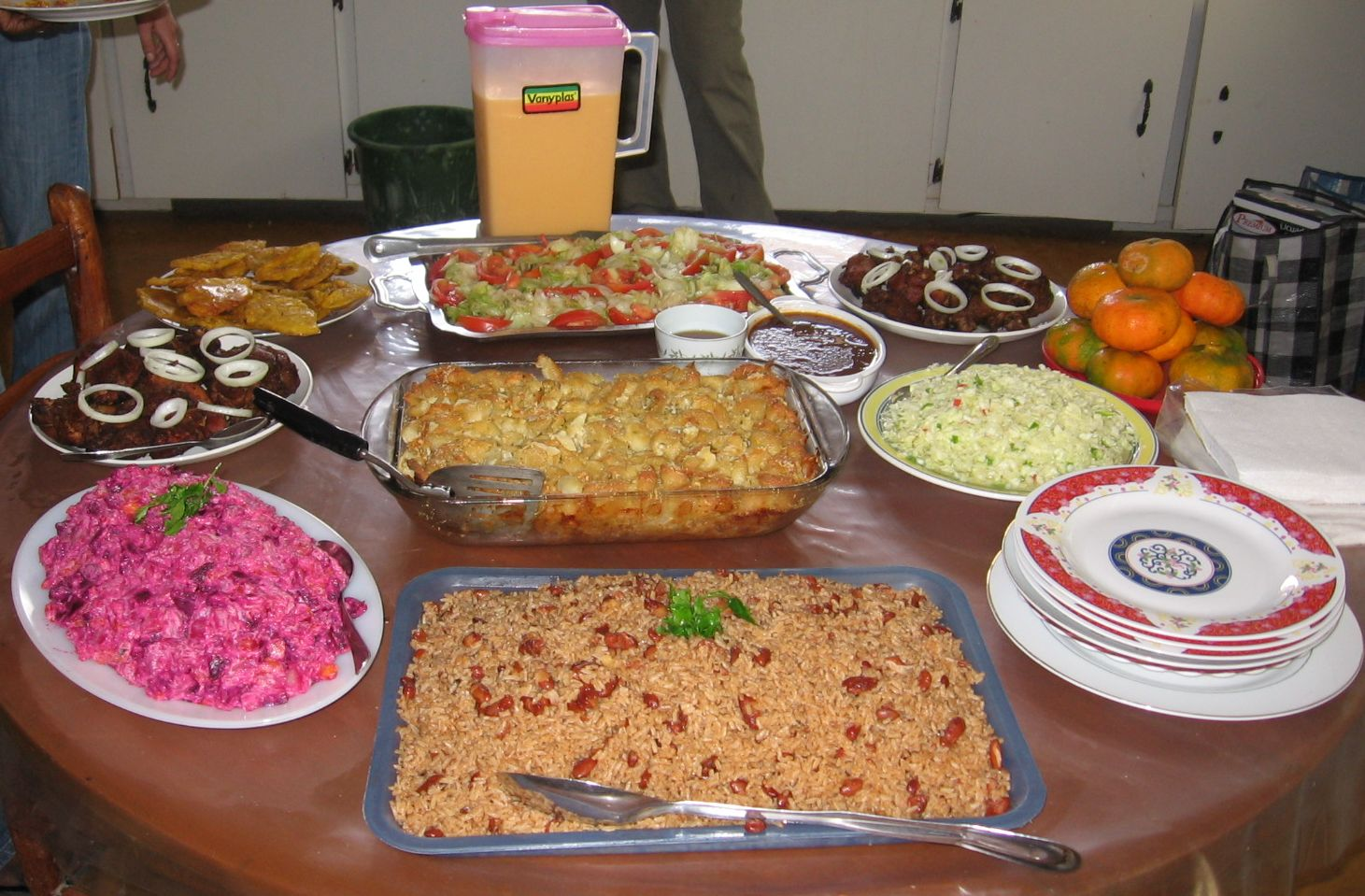
Haitian food

Haitian cuisine is a Creole cuisine that originates from a blend of several culinary styles that populated the western portion of the island of Hispaniola, namely African, French, Indigenous, Spanish, and Levantine influences. Haitian cuisine has some similarities with "criollo" (Spanish for 'creole') cooking and similar to other Caribbean cuisine, but differs in several ways from its regional counterparts. Flavors are bold and spicy, demonstrating African and French influences, with notable derivatives coming from Indigenous and Spanish techniques.

Levantine influences have made their way into the mainstream culture, due to an Arab migration over the years forming a community of shared Arab descent. Years of adaptation have led to these cuisines to merge into Haitian cuisine.

== History ==
=== Pre-colonial cuisine ===
Haiti was one of many Caribbean islands inhabited by Indigenous peoples, including the Taíno, speakers of an Arawakan language called Taíno. The barbecue originated in Haiti. The word 'barbecue' derives from the word barabicu, found in the language of the Taíno people of the Caribbean and entered European languages in the form barbacoa. Specifically, the Oxford English Dictionary translates the word as "framework of sticks set upon posts".

Gonzalo Fernández de Oviedo y Valdés, a Spanish explorer, was the first to use the word "barbecoa" in print in Spain in 1526 in the Diccionario de la Lengua Española (2nd Edition) of the Real Academia Española. After Columbus landed in the Americas in 1492, the Spaniards found native Haitians roasting animal meat over a grill consisting of a wooden framework resting on sticks and a fire made underneath so that flames and smoke would rise and envelop the animal meat, giving it a certain flavor. The same framework was used as a means of protection against the wild that may attack during the middle of the night while at sleep. The barbecue not only survived in the Haitian cuisine, but was introduced to many different parts of the world and has numerous regional variations.

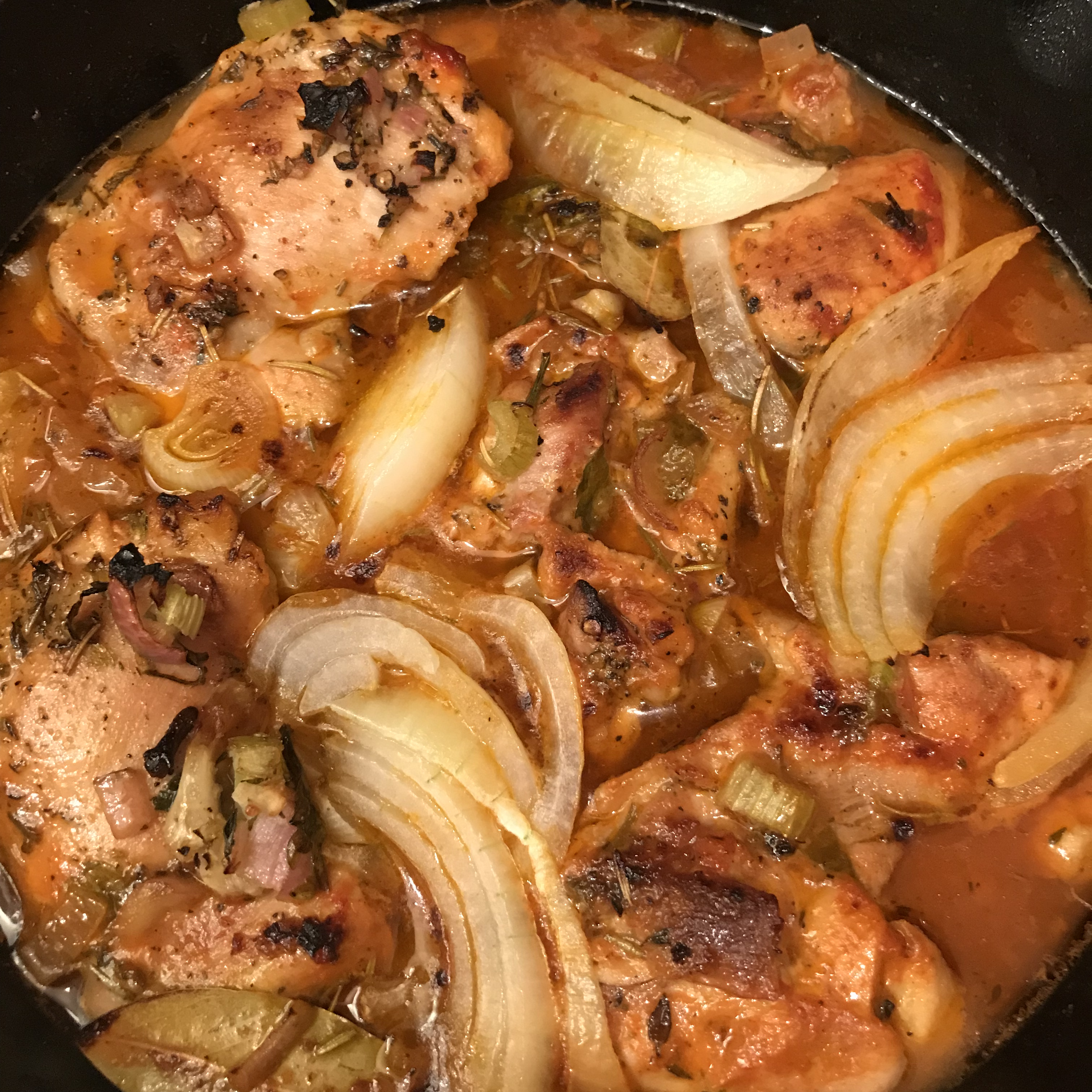
Poul nan sòs (chicken in sauce)

=== Colonial cuisine ===
Christopher Columbus landed at Môle Saint-Nicolas on 5 December 1492, and claimed the island he named La Isla Espanola (later named Hispaniola) for Spain. The Spanish established sugar plantations and made the natives work as slaves; however, the harsh conditions and infectious diseases brought over by the Spanish sailors nearly wiped out the indigenous population by 1520 as the natives lacked immunity to these new diseases, The Spaniards imported slaves from Africa to work these plantations instead. The Africans introduced okra (also called gumbo; edible pods), ackee (red and yellow fruit), taro (an edible root), pigeon peas (seeds of an African shrub), and various spices to the diet. In 1659, the French had established themselves on the western portion of the islands of Hispaniola and Tortuga by the way of buccaneers. The Treaty of Ryswick of 1697 allowed the French to acquire the western portion of the island from the Spanish they had neglected. By the 1700s, the French had situated control comfortably, successfully cultivating sugarcane, coffee, cotton, and cocoa from the African slave labor. When the Haitian Revolution ended and the First Empire of Haiti was established in 1804, thousands of refugees from the revolution, both whites and free people of color (affranchis or gens de couleur libres), fled to New Orleans, often bringing African slaves with them, doubling the city's population. They also introduced such Haitian specialties as red beans and rice and mirliton (or chayote; a pear-shaped vegetable) to the Louisiana Creole cuisine.

Since independence from France, the French influence has remained evident in the Haitian society, not only in the usage of the language but in the contributions to the cuisine. French cheeses, breads and desserts are still common foods found at local stores and markets.

== Common ingredients ==
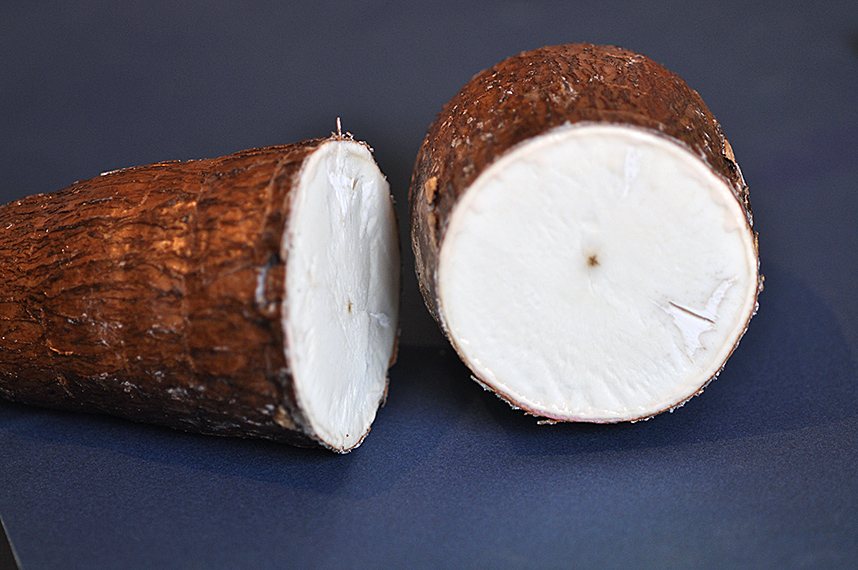
A cross-section of cassava

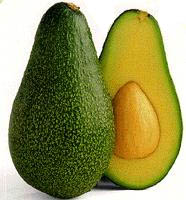
Avocado fruit (cv. 'Fuerte'); left: whole, right: in section

Common ingredients for preparing cuisine include:

- Apricot
- Avocado
- Basil
- Banana
- Bay leaf
- Beef
- Beetroot
- Black bean
- Black pepper
- Bouillon cube
- Breadfruit
- Bulgur wheat (locally known as "blé")
- Cabbage
- Calabaza (a squash, also called "West Indian pumpkin")
- Carrot
- Cashew nuts
- Cayenne pepper
- Cassava (locally known as 'cassave')
- Chayote
- Chicken
- Chicken broth
- Chickpeas
- Chives
- Cinnamon
- Cloves
- Coconut
- Coconut milk
- Codfish
- Conch
- Condensed milk
- Coriander
- Cornmeal
- Corn starch
- Cow foot
- Crab meat
- Dewberry
- Dried and salted cod
- Dried black trumpet mushroom (locally called "djon-djon")
- Eggplant
- Eggs
- Epis
- Evaporated milk
- Ginger
- Goat meat
- Grapefruit
- Green peas
- Grenadine
- Ground cloves
- Guava
- Habanero peppers
- Herring
- Hominy
- Jerk spice
- Kidney beans (also called "red beans")
- Lamb meat
- Lard
- Leek
- Lemon
- Lima bean
- Lobster meat
- Malanga (also called "accra")
- Mango
- Millet
- Molasses
- Mushroom
- Mustard
- Okra
- Onion
- Oxtail
- Papaya
- Passion fruit
- Parsley
- Pigeon peas
- Pineapple
- Pinto bean
- Plantain
- Polenta
- Pork
- Quenepe
- Rhum
- Rice
- Rosemary
- Salted beef
- Salted fish
- Scotch bonnet
- Shallot
- Shrimp
- Soursop
- Sour orange
- Spinach
- Star anise
- Sugarcane
- Sugarcane juice
- Sweet potato
- Tamarind
- Taro root
- Tomato sauce
- Vanilla extract
- Vinegar
- Watercress
- Yam

== Common foods ==
Haitian cuisine is often lumped together with other regional islands as "Caribbean cuisine", although it maintains a unique flavor. It involves the extensive use of herbs and the liberal use of peppers. A typical dish would be a plate of riz collé aux pois (diri kole ak pwa), which is rice with red kidney beans (pinto beans are often used as well) glazed with a marinade as a sauce and topped off with red snapper, tomatoes and onions. It is often called the Riz National, considered to be the national rice of Haiti.

Rice is occasionally eaten with beans alone, but more often than not, some sort of meat completes the dish. Bean purée or sauce pois (sos pwa) is often poured on top of white rice. The traditional Haitian sauce pois is less thick than Cuban black bean soup. Black beans are usually the beans of choice, followed by red beans, white beans, and peas. Chicken is frequently eaten, as are goat meat (cabrit) and beef (boeuf). Chicken is often boiled in a marinade consisting of lemon juice, sour orange, Scotch bonnet pepper, garlic and other seasonings, then subsequently fried until crispy.

Légume Haïtien (or simply "légume'" in Haiti) is a thick vegetable stew consisting of a mashed mixture of eggplant, cabbage, chayote, spinach, watercress and other vegetables depending on availability and the cook's preference. It is flavored with épice, onions, garlic, and tomato paste, and generally cooked with beef or crab. Légume is most often served with rice, but may also be served with other starches, including mais moulin (mayi moulen), a savory cornmeal porridge similar to polenta or grits), petit mil (cooked millet), or blé (wheat).

Other starches commonly eaten include yam, sweet potato, potato, and breadfruit. These are frequently eaten with a thin sauce consisting of tomato paste, onions, spices, and dried fish.

Tchaka is a hearty stew consisting of hominy, beans, joumou (squash), and meat (often pork).

Boulette are bread-bound meatballs seasoned in Haitian fashion.

Haitian spaghetti is often served in Haiti as a breakfast dish and is cooked with hot dogs, dried herring, seeds, and spices, then served with tomato sauce and sometimes raw watercress.

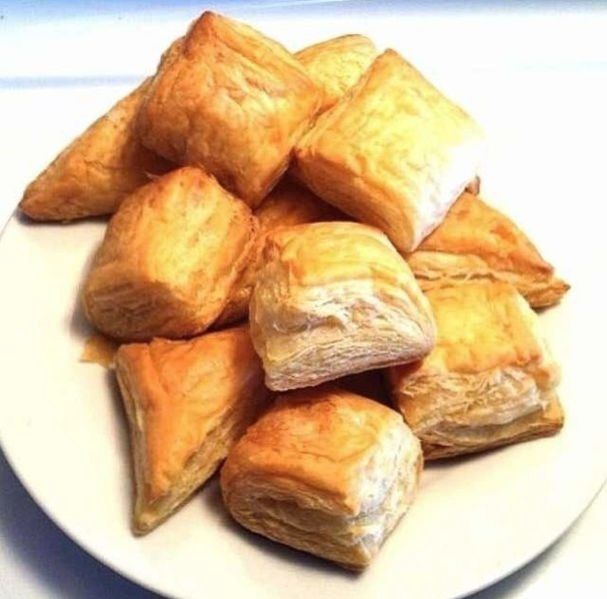
Haitian patties

One of the country's best-known appetizers is the Haitian patty (pâté), which are made with either ground beef, chicken, salted cod, smoked herring (food), and ground turkey surrounded by a crispy or flaky crust. Other snacks include crispy, spicy fried malanga fritters called accra (akra), bananes pesées, and marinade, a fried savory dough ball. For a complete meal, they may be served with griot (fried pork), tassot cabrit (fried goat meat) or other fried meat. These foods are served with a spicy slaw called pikliz which consists of cabbage, carrot, vinegar, Scotch bonnet pepper, and spices. Fried foods, collectively known as fritaille (fritay), are sold widely on the streets. Haitian fries and sweet Haitian vanilla bean marshmallows are also popular appetizers in Haiti.

=== Regional dishes ===
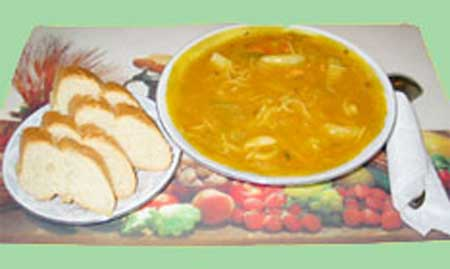
Bowl of soup joumou and bread

Regional dishes also exist throughout Haiti. In the area around Jérémie, in the Grand'Anse department at the southwest tip of the country on the Gulf of Gonâve, a dish called tonmtonm, which is steamed breadfruit called lam veritab mashed in a pilon, is eaten. Tonmtonm is swallowed without chewing, using a slippery sauce made of okra (kalalou), cooked with meat, fish, crab, and savory spices. Tonmtonm is very similar to West African fufu. Another regional dish called poul ak nwa (poulet aux noix de cajou), chicken with cashew nuts, is from the north of the country, in the area around Cap-Haïtien.

Waves of migration have also influenced Haitian cuisine. For example, immigrants from Lebanon and Syria brought kibbeh, which has been adopted into Haitian cuisine.

The flavor base of much Haitian cooking is epis, a combination sauce made from cooked peppers, garlic, and herbs, particularly green onions, thyme, and parsley. It is also used as a basic condiment for rice and beans and is also used in stews and soups.

Bouillon cubes are often used by Haitian cooks, especially with the increasingly imported Maggi brand.

== Food by departments ==
Department	Dish
Artibonite	Lalo stew and white rice
Centre	Goat meat and turkey meat
Grand'Anse	Tonmtonm with okra stew
Nippes	
Nord	Chicken stew with cashew nuts and djondjon rice
Nord-Est	
Nord-Ouest	
Ouest	Rice and peas with griot, Haitian patties, Haitian spaghetti
Sud-Est	Poisson gros-de-sel
Sud	Conch and fish

== Beverages and drinks ==
=== Beer ===
Beer is one of several common alcoholic beverages consumed in Haiti. The most consumed brand of beer in Haiti is Prestige, a mild lager. Prestige is brewed by Brasserie Nationale d'Haiti (owned by Heineken).

=== Rum ===
Haiti is known internationally for its rum. Rhum Barbancourt is a well-known producer. Haitian rum follows the French Caribbean rum tradition in that the distilleries use sugarcane juice directly instead of molasses like other types of rum, hence the added "h" in rhum to differentiate. The rum is marketed in approximately 20 countries and uses a process of distillation similar to the process used to produce cognac.

=== Clairin ===
Clairin (Haitian Creole: kleren) is a distilled spirit, made from cane sugar, that undergoes the same distillation process as rhum, but is less refined. It is sometimes referred to as a white rhum because of the similar qualities. It is considered to be a cheaper option than standard rhum in Haiti. It is also used in Vodou rituals.

=== Crémas ===
Crémas, also spelled Crémasse (Haitian Creole: kremas), is a sweet and creamy alcoholic beverage native to Haiti. The beverage is made primarily from creamed coconut, sweetened condensed or evaporated milk, and rum. The rum used is usually dark; however, white rum is used frequently as well. Various other spices are added for additional flavoring such as cinnamon, nutmeg, anise, as well as miscellaneous ingredients such as the widely used vanilla extract or raisins. Recipes vary from person to person with a few differences in ingredients here and there. However, the overall look and taste are the same. The beverage possesses a creamy consistency similar to a thick milkshake and varies from off-white to beige in color. It is a very popular drink, served regularly at social events and during the holidays. It is usually consumed along with a sweet pastry of some sort. The drink is often served cold; however, it can be served at room temperature. The beverage has become recently marketed in Haiti as well as the United States.

=== Non-alcoholic ===
Due to its tropical climate, juice is a mainstay in Haiti. Juices from many fruits are commonly made and can be found everywhere. Guava juice, grapefruit juice, mango juice, along with the juices of many citrus fruits (orange, granadilla, passion fruit, etc.) are enjoyed. Juice is the de facto beverage because of its variety of flavors, easy production, and widespread accessibility. Malt beverages, which are non-alcoholic drinks consisting of unfermented barley with molasses added for flavor are commonly drunk. Fruit champagne flavored Cola Couronne, is arguably the most popular soda in Haiti and its diaspora, as it is a stapled beverage since 1924. Cola Lacaye is also another brand of soda that comes in a variety of flavors including fruit cola. In the more urban areas of the nation, American beverages such as Coca-Cola and PepsiCo are also enjoyed. Milkshakes (or milkchèyk) are also drunk regularly. Sweet, strong coffee is enjoyed throughout the nation. Since 1898, one of the oldest coffee brands, Café Selecto and the more recent Rebo, both offer popular blends. Haitian coffee has a classic and rich taste of chocolatey sweet with mellow citrus highlights. Jus Papaye is a Haitian papaya juice milkshake flavored with vanilla. Akasan is a popular drink in Haiti made with milk, corn flour, anise stars, vanilla and cinnamon.

== Desserts ==
Many types of desserts are eaten in Haiti ranging from the mild to sweet. Sugarcane is used frequently in the making of these desserts, although granulated sugar is also used often. A shaved ice dessert, fresco, is similar to an Italian ice, but consists primarily of fruit syrup. Pain patate (pen patat) is a soft sweet bread made using cinnamon, evaporated milk, and sweet potato. It is usually served cold from the refrigerator but it can also be eaten at room temperature. Akasan is a thick corn milkshake with a consistency similar to that of labouille (labouyi), a type of cornmeal porridge. It is made using many of the same ingredients as pain patate consisting of evaporated milk, and sugar. Dous Makòs is a Haitian vanilla fudge. Dous Kokoye Graje is a fudge made of shaved coconut. Bonbon Amidon, also known as Haitian starch cookies, are a sweet, dry, white cookie typically made for holidays and gatherings.

== List of Haitian dishes ==
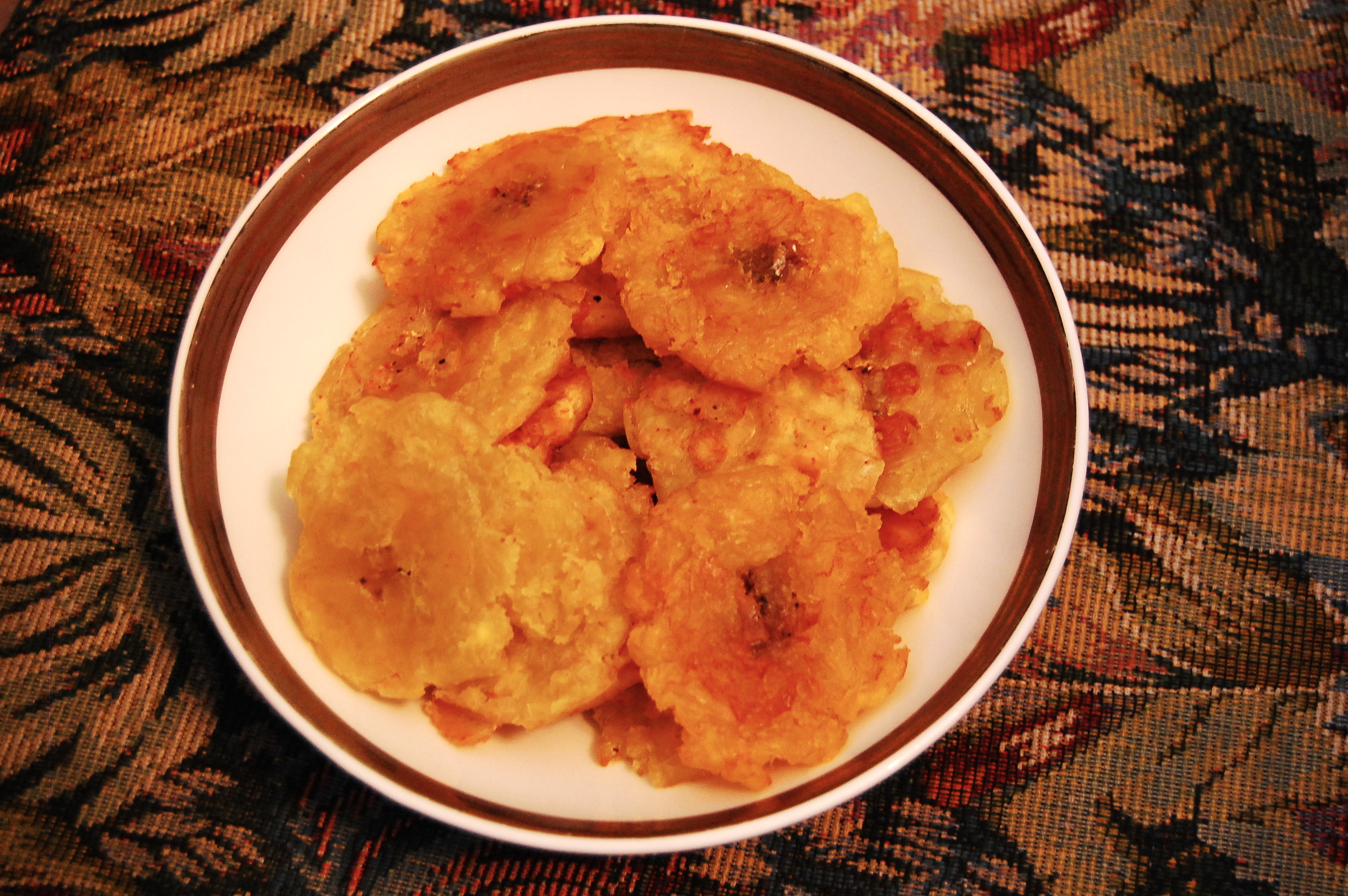
Double-fried plantain

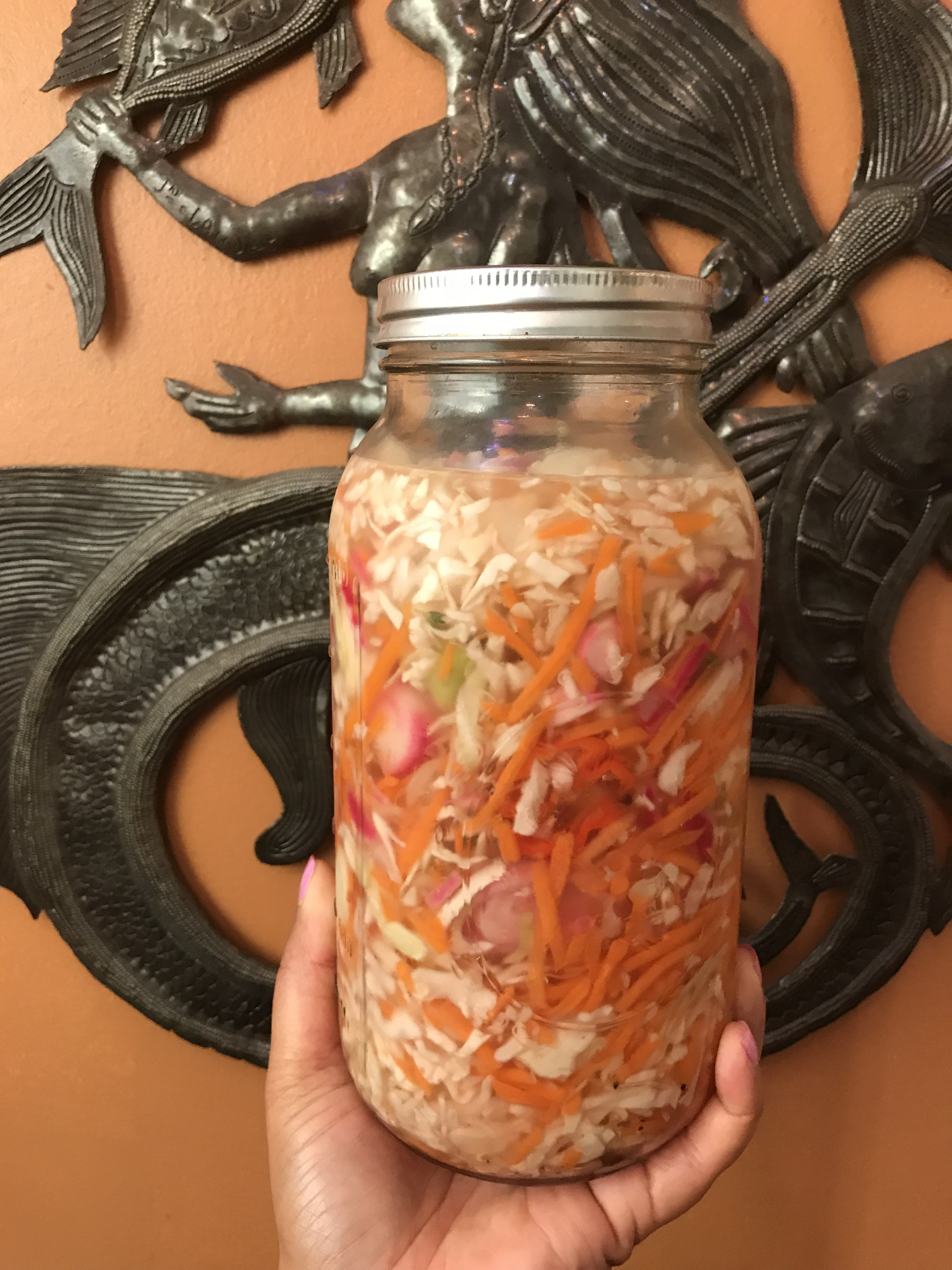
Haitian pikliz

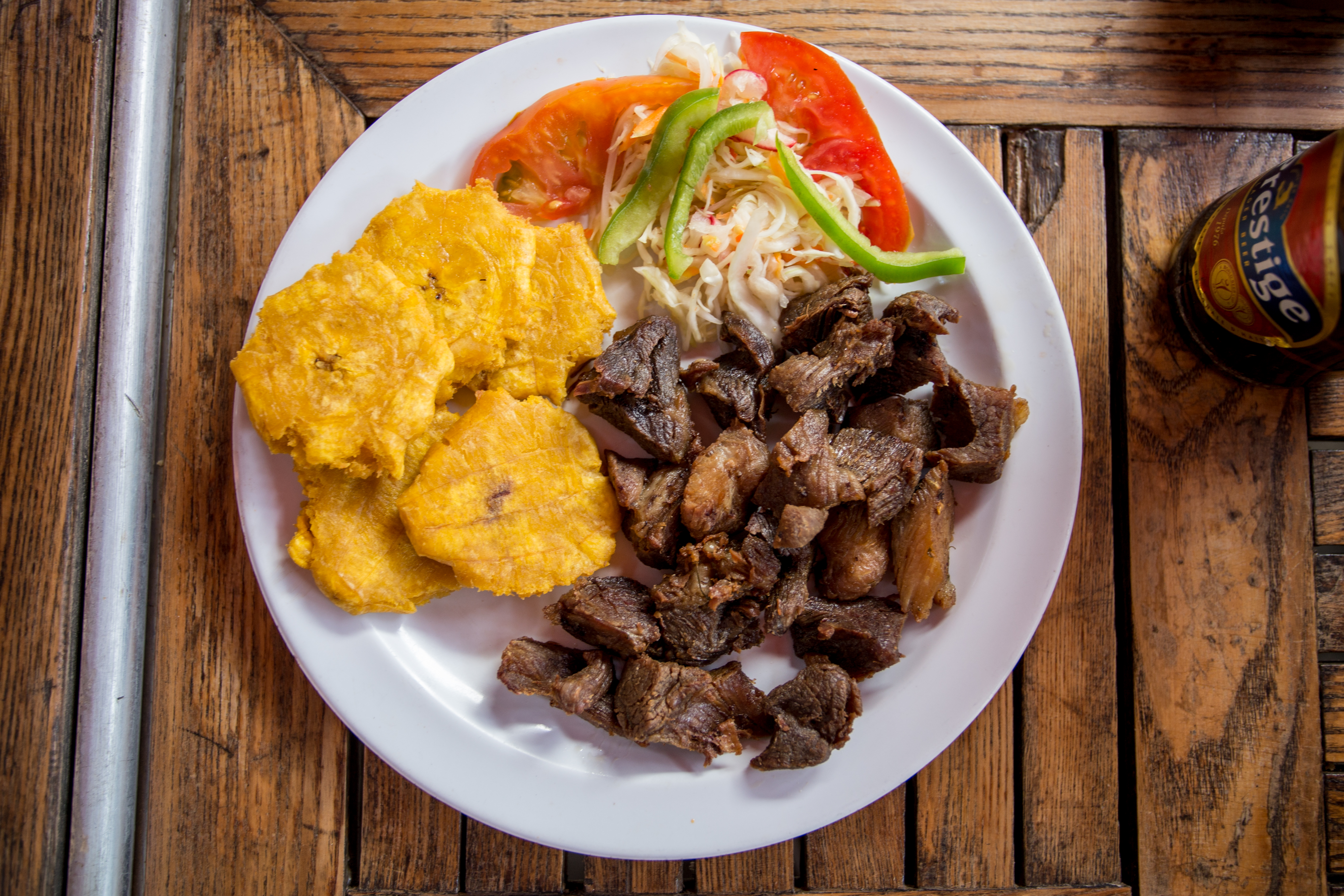
Griot served with fried plantains and pikliz

- Bouillon
- Brochette
- Cassave or kasav (flatbread made out of dried, processed bitter cassava, sometimes flavored with sweetened coconut)
- Chocolat des Cayes or Chokola La Kaye (homemade cocoa)
- Doukounou (cornmeal pudding; neither sweet or savory)
- Du riz blanche a sause pois noir or diri blan ak sos pwa nwa (white rice and black bean sauce)
- Du riz djon djon or diri ak djon djon (rice in black mushroom sauce)
- Du riz a légume or diri ak legim (rice with legumes)
- Du riz a pois or diri ak pwa (rice and beans)
- Du riz a pois rouges or diri ak pwa wouj (rice and red beans)
- Du riz ak pois Congo (rice with pigeon peas)
- Du riz a sauce pois or diri ak sos pwa (rice with bean sauce)
- Du riz a Lalo
- Griot (seasoned fried pork with scallions and peppers in a bitter orange sauce)
- Macaroni au Gratin (macaroni and cheese)
- Marinad
- Pain Haïtien (Haitian Bread)
- Pâté Haïtien (Haitian patty) - A very popular savory snack made with a delicate puff pastry stuffed with ground beef, salted cod (bacalao), smoked herring, chicken, and ground turkey topped with spices for a bold and spicy unique flavor.
- Peanut Pralines
- Picklese or Pikliz (a slaw-like condiment made with spicy pickled cabbage, onion, carrot, and Scotch bonnet peppers)
- Salade de Betteraves (Beet salad)
- Sauce Ti-Malice or Sos Ti-Malice (a spicy tangy sauce usually served over Griot or Cabrit)
- Soup joumou
- Tassot et bananes pesées or Taso ak bannann peze (Fried Goat and fried plantains)
- bannann peze
- Poul an Sòs (Chicken in Creole Sauce)
- Potato gratin
- Salad Rus (beets, potato and egg salad)

== See also ==
- Festival du Rhum Haiti
- Mud cookie
- Springfield, Ohio, cat-eating hoax
