= Fritay =

Haitian Street food

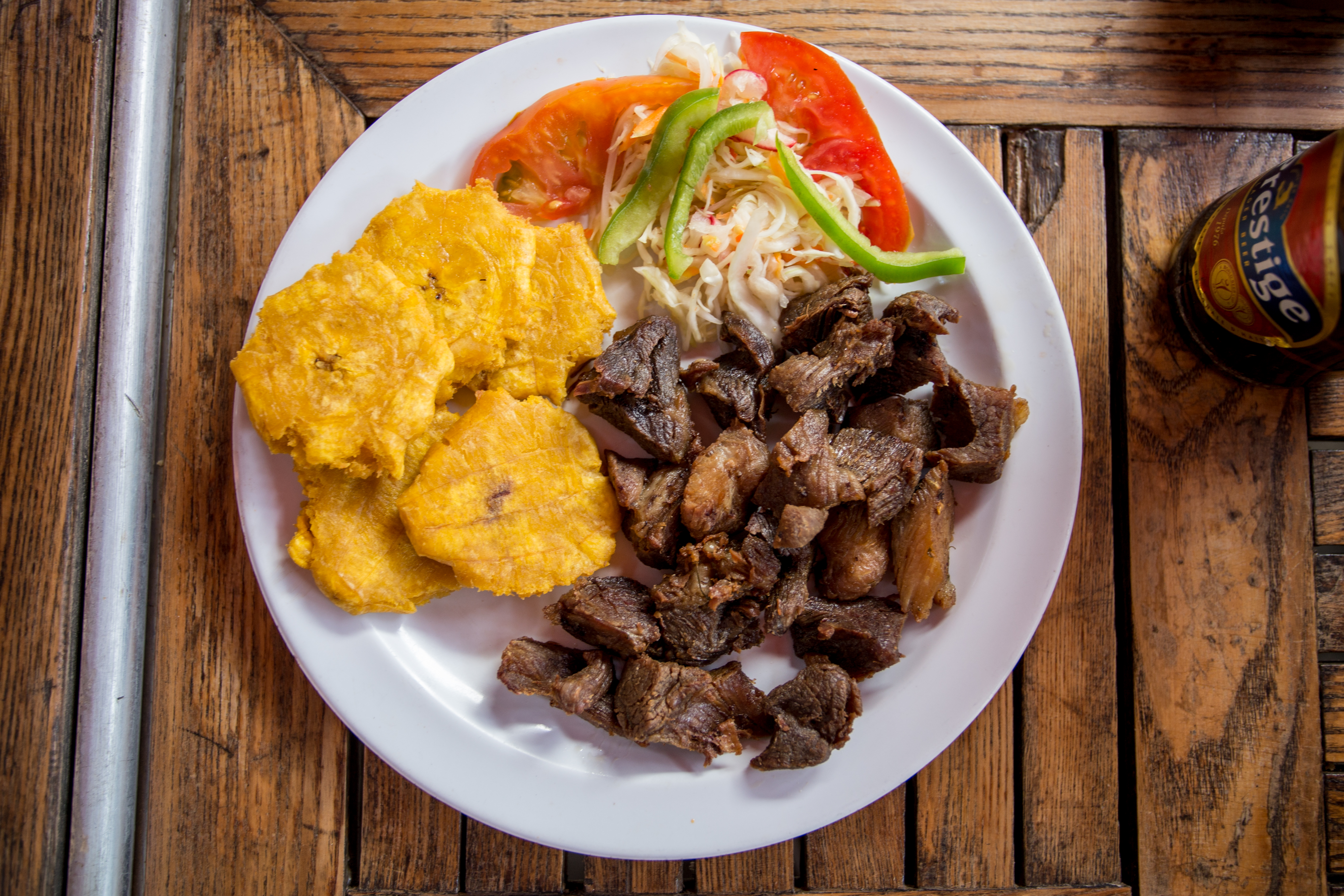
- Griot – National Dish in Haitian Cuisine.
- Alternative names: Friture Haïtienne
- Type: Street Food
- Place of origin: Haiti
- Region or state: Caribbean
- Associated cuisine: Haitian cuisine, Caribbean cuisine,
- Serving temperature: Hot
- Main ingredients: Fried meats with various Vegetables, served with Creole sauce and pikliz
- Variations: Numerous variations across Haiti

Fritay, (/friˈtaɪ/; Haitian Creole: Fritay; French: Friture Haïtienne) collectively known as Fritaille, are street foods and culinary styles associated with Haitian culture. Mostly fried foods, this cuisine has evolved through centuries of social and political change from influences of African, Arawak/Taino, European and Haitian influences. It is served at markets, celebrations, and festivals.

== History ==
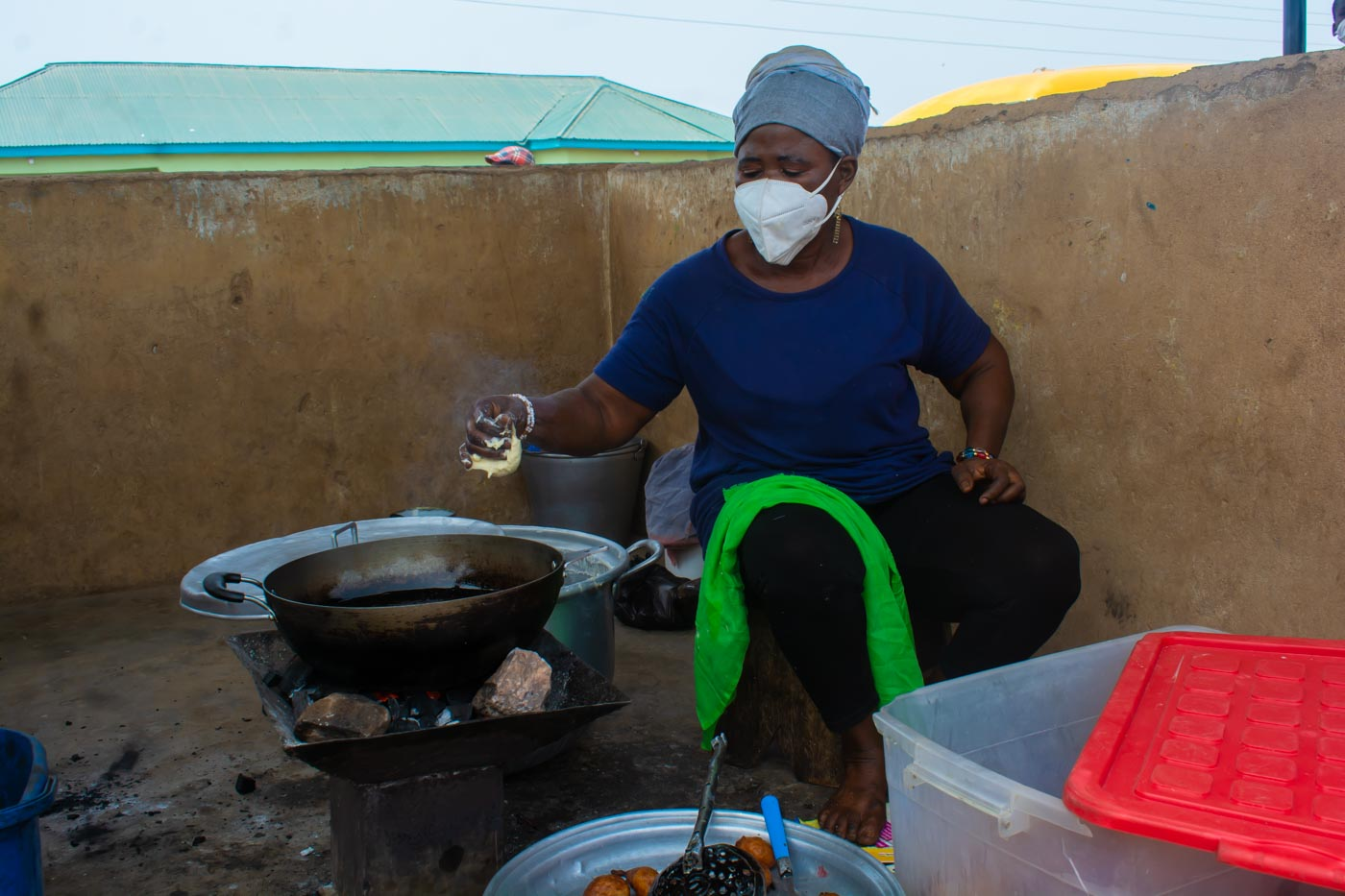
Woman Frying Breadfruit

Haitian barbecue (Haitian Creole: boukannen /bukã.nen/), has a rich history in Hispaniola (modern-day Haiti). It traces back to the Indigenous Taíno people's barabicu and separately to West and Central Africa. It is an essential element of Haitian cooking. The prevalence of street and festival venues made these Haitian foods convenient. It uses oils and conventional cooking methods to make a cohesive and distinct culture. All over Haiti, it is sought out in the evening out on the streets

== Griyo or Griot ==
Griot is chunks of pork shoulder marinated in citrus juice, epis and spices; then fried, baked, or both until crispy. It is traditionally served with Haitian Creole: Diri Kolè (Rice and Red Beans), pikliz and bananes pesées. It is especially popular during Fèt Gede; a significant Haitian festival, often called Haiti's "Day of the Dead" or "Festival of the Ancestors".

== List of dishes ==
- Poul Fri – Dish of seasoned chicken pieces that are coated and fried
- Griot – Dish in Haitian cuisine (Fried Pork)
- Tassot Koden or Tassot Dinde (Fried Turkey)
- Tassot Vyan Bèf (Fried Beef)
- Tassot Cabrit (Fried Goat)
- Fried or smoked Saucisse (Fried Sausage)
- Pwason fri – (Fried Snapper)
- Krab fri (Fried Crab) and Lobster
- Boulette – Dish of ground meat rolled into a ball and fried
  - Salmon Boulette
  - Turkey Boulette
- Lambi (conch salad)
- Akra or Accra – fritters made from malanga or Taro root
- Plantain soup
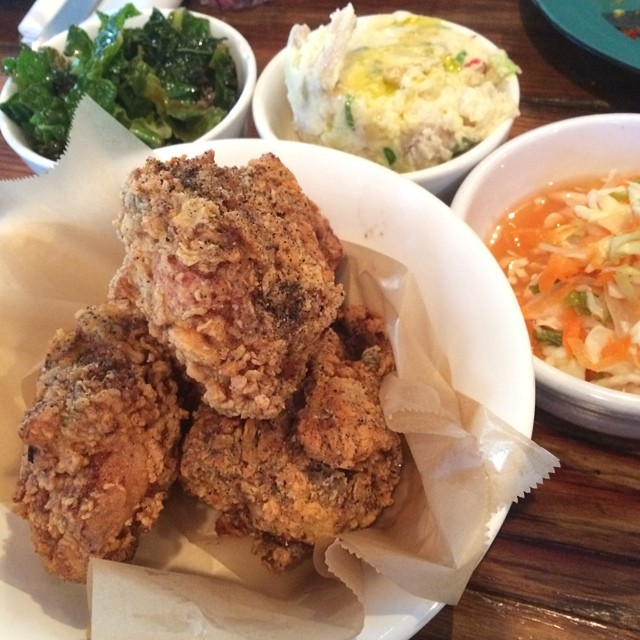
Fried Chicken

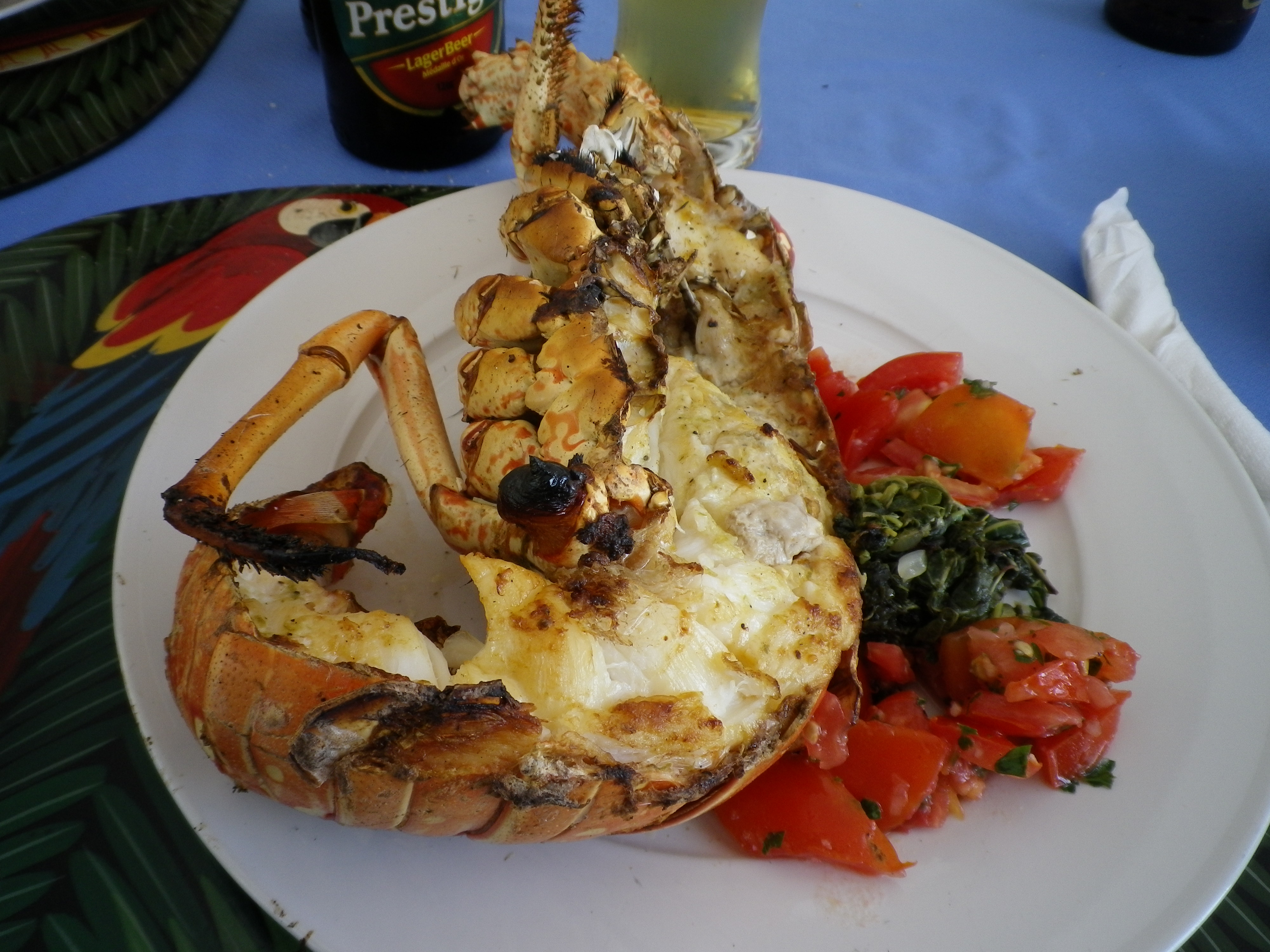
Fried Lobster

=== List of Snacks ===
- Bannann Peze Dous – Sweet Fried plantain
- Bannann Peze – Green Fried plantains
- Marinad – Herb seasoned fried flour fritters
  - Aronso (herring) filling
- Kokiyòl – Haitian Donuts
- Patat – Fried Potatoes/Sweet Potatoes or manyòk (Yucca)
- Salade Russe – Russian traditional dish with beets in the Haitian version of Olivier salad.
- Benyen De Kanaval (Beignet De Carnaval) Haitian beignets made with bananas.
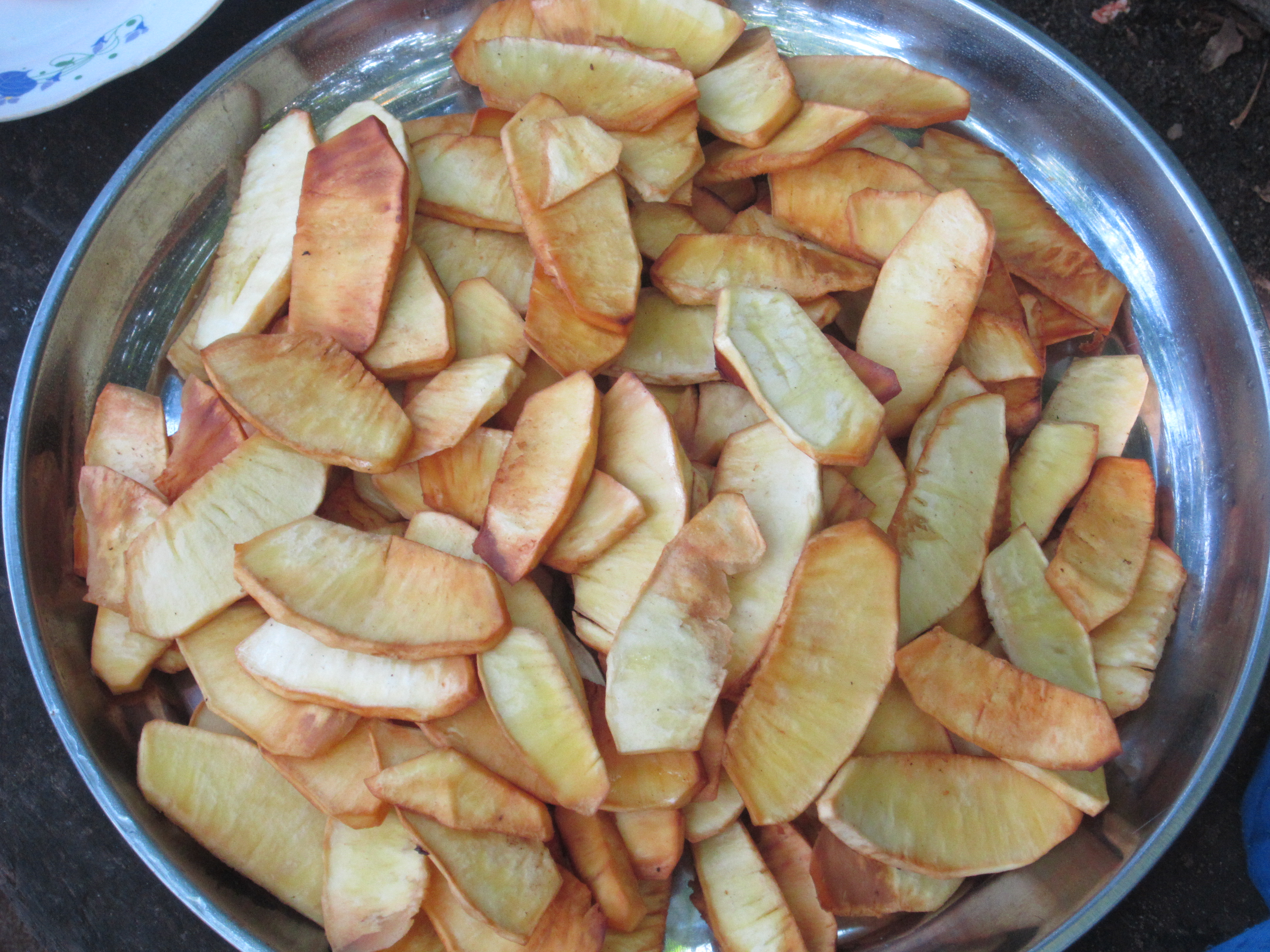
Lam veritab fri (Fried Breadfruit.

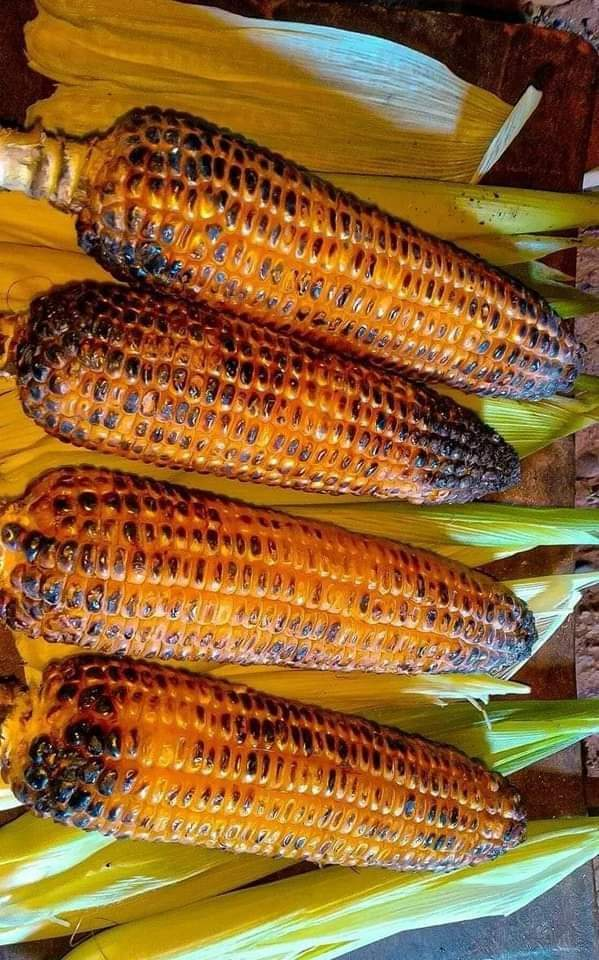
Mayi Boukannen - Roasted Corn

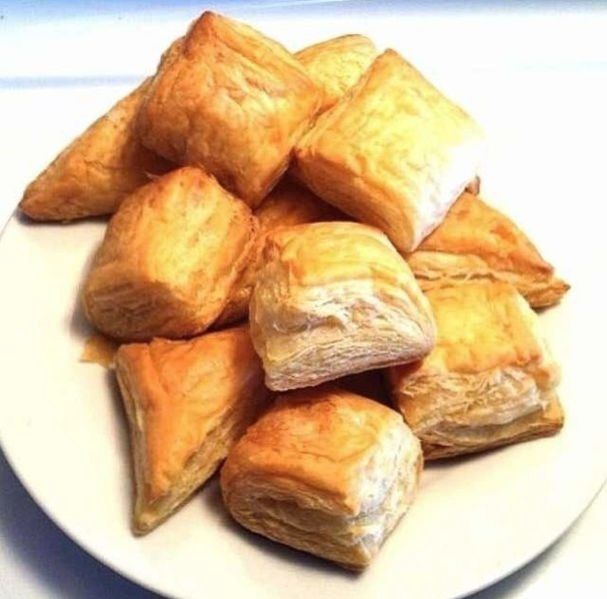
Haitian patty - (pâté).

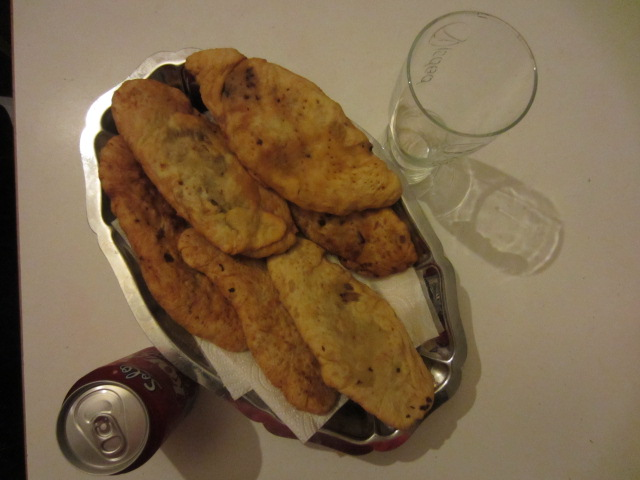
Pâté_Kòdé are deep-fried turnovers

== See also ==
- Haitian cuisine
- List of street foods
- Regional street food
- Caribbean cuisine
