= Haitian patty =

Haitian puff pastry

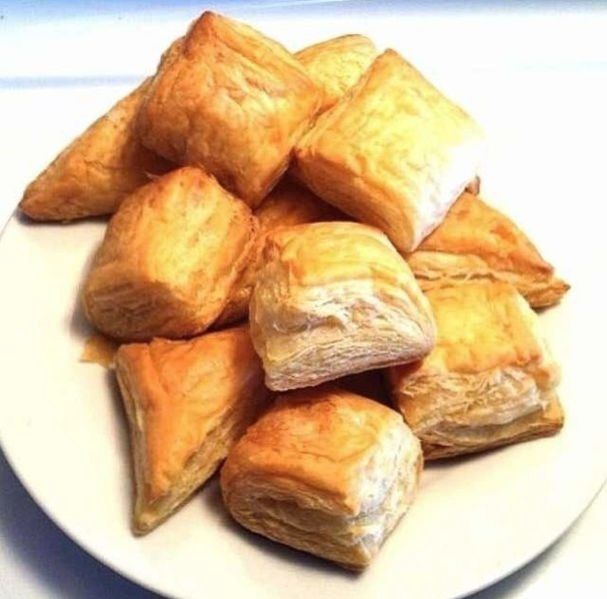
- Alternative names: Pâté Ayisyen
- Type: Pastry, Turnover
- Place of origin: Haiti
- Main ingredients: Puff pastry, savoury filling

A Haitian patty (French: pâté haïtien, Haitian Creole: pate ayisyen) is a puff pastry commonly filled with beef, fish or chicken seasoned with epis. They are widely available in American cities with significant Haitian diaspora communities, including Brooklyn, New York; Miami, Florida; and Boston, Massachusetts.

== Variations ==
The stuffing of the Haitian patty may be prepared with ingredients (which can be finely chopped or ground), such as beef, chicken, griot (marinated pork shoulder), salted cod, smoked herring (often finely chopped), vegetable mix, and lambi (conch).

== Pate kòde ==
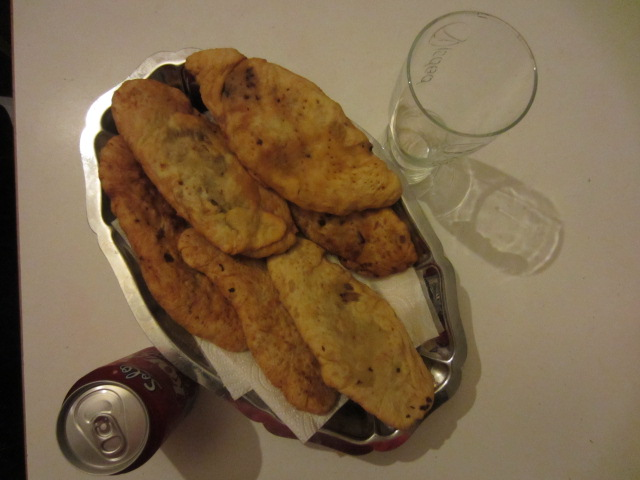
Pate kòde

Pate kòde (bunched patty) or pate chodyè (pot patty) is the street-food (fritay) version of the Haitian patty (Pâté Ayisyen). It is commonly served in a form of an empanada and is deep fried. The traditional stuffings used in the preparation of the Pate Kòde include diced meat accompanied with sautéed onions and green bell peppers, boiled eggs, pikliz, and shredded cabbage.

== See also ==
- Cuban pastry
- Pasteles
- Empanada
- Jamaican patty
