= Kremas =

Haitian alcoholic beverage

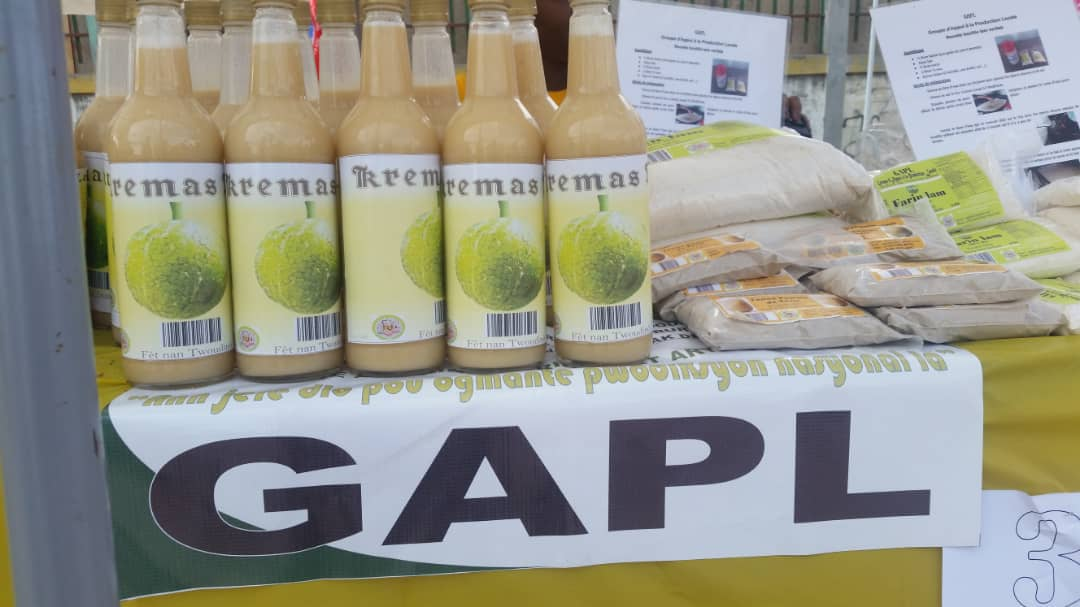
- Kremas for sale at a market in Haiti
- Other name(s): crémasse, crémas
- Origin: Haiti
- Ingredients: cream of coconut, condensed milk, Barbancourt rum, vanilla extract, lime juice, various spices (e.g. cinnamon, clove, and nutmeg), and sometimes tropical fruits (e.g, mango and pineapple)

Kremas (/ˌkreɪˈmɑːs/, from Haitian Creole), also known as crémasse (from French, pronounced [kʁɛ.mas]) and crémas, is a sweet and creamy alcoholic beverage found in Haitian cuisine. The main ingredients are cream of coconut, condensed milk, Barbancourt rum, vanilla extract, lime juice, and various spices. Recipes from different parts of Haiti and the Haitian diaspora call for different spices and may include tropical fruits. Kremas is typically drunk during the Christmas season.

== Ingredients and preparation ==
Kremas is made by mixing sweetened cream of coconut (a type of coconut milk not to be confused with coconut cream), condensed milk, Barbancourt rum, vanilla extract, lime juice, and spices such as cinnamon, clove, and nutmeg. The spices used vary between recipes, and regional variants may include fruits such as lemons, mangos and pineapples. Kremas served in northern Haiti often has pineapple flavoring, while in the south more coconut is used. Kremas specialty drinks with chocolate, strawberry, or almond flavoring are popular among Haitian Americans in Florida.

== Storage and serving ==
Kremas is usually bottled and may be kept in a refrigerator for a few days after mixing to enrich the flavors. It is typically served over ice cubes and shaken first if served from a bottle. It is a popular drink during the Christmas season.

Clairin, a spirit made from sugarcane, has traditionally been added to kremas.

== Similar drinks ==
Kremas is often compared to coquito, a Puerto Rican alcoholic beverage also made from rum and coconut milk, and also served during Christmas time.

== See also ==
- Rhum agricole
- Haitian cuisine
