= Damoiseau Rhum =

Distillery

Damoiseau
- Manufacturer: Damoiseau
- Origin: Guadeloupe
- Introduced: 1942
- Variants: Rhum blanc, rhum ambré et rhum vieux
- Website: Damoiseau Rum

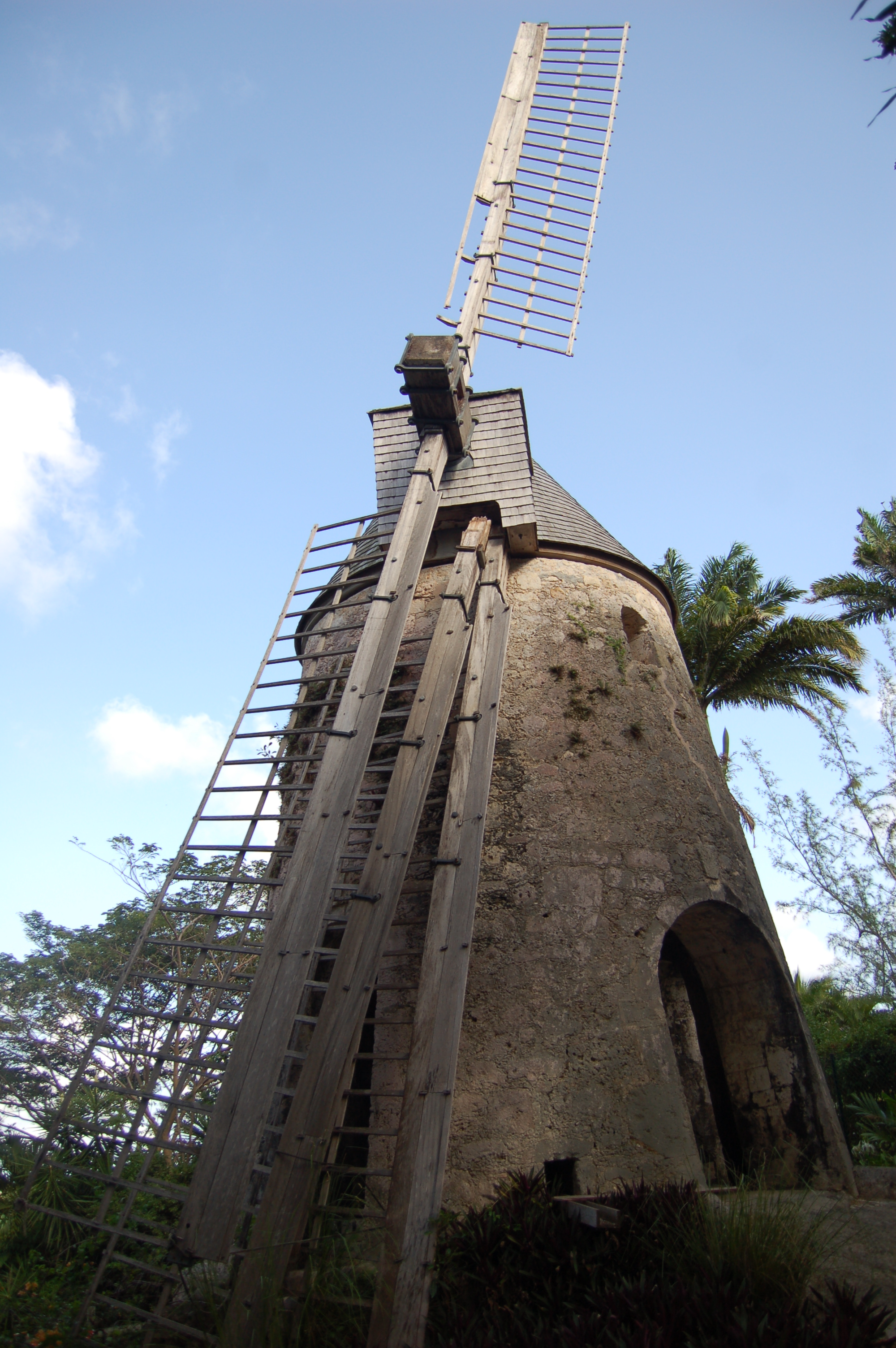
Windmill at the Damoiseau rum distillery, Le Moule, Guadeloupe.

Damoiseau is a rhum agricole distillery located in Le Moule, Guadeloupe. It is one of five distilleries in the Guadeloupe archipelago, and the only one in the Grande-Terre region. It has roots back to the 19th century and was originally founded as an agricultural estate. Damoiseau is the leading rum producer in Guadeloupe, producing more than 8 million litres per year and exported to more than 40 countries worldwide.

== History ==
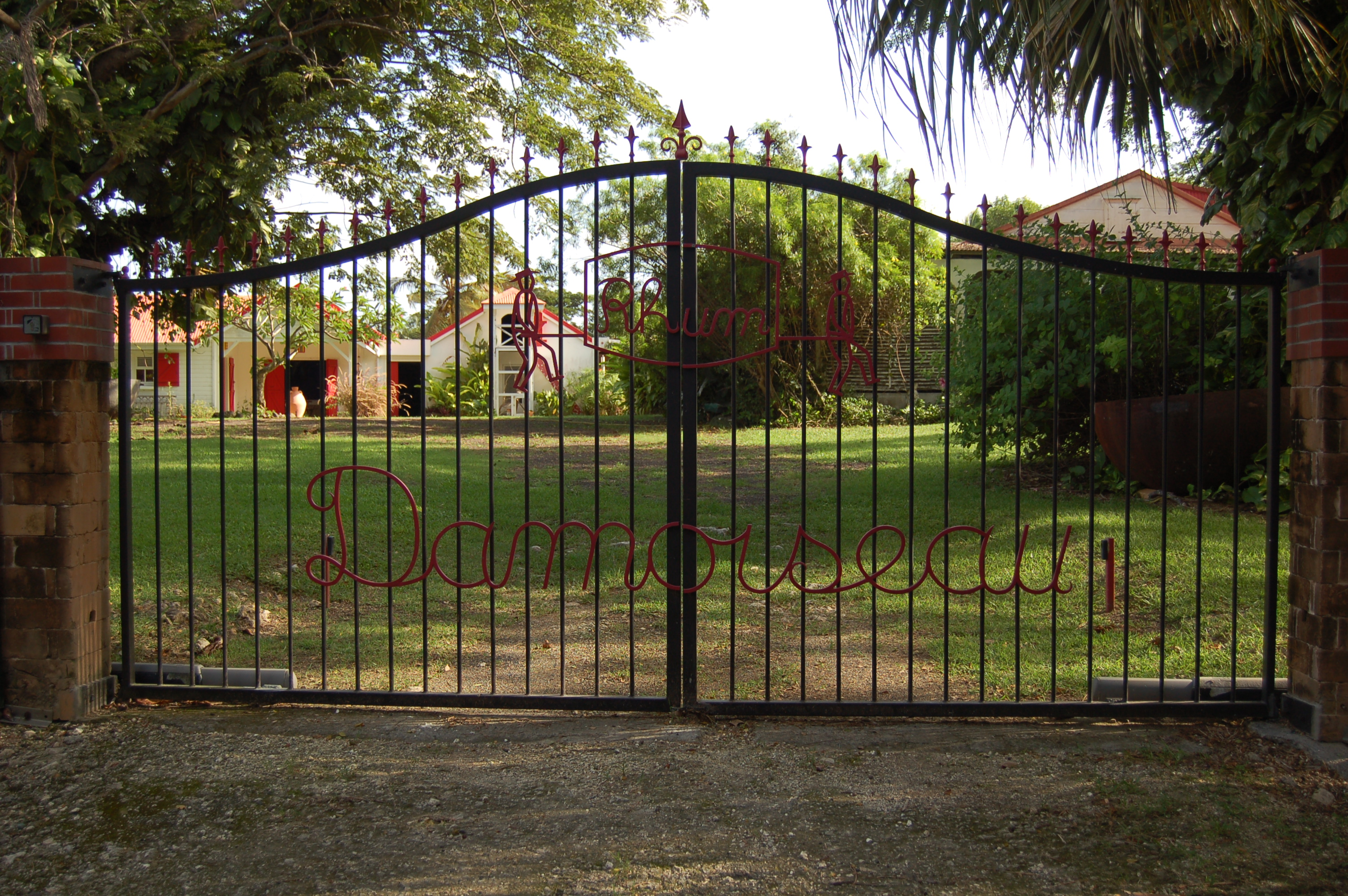
Entrance gate

The Bellevue estate, upon which the Damoiseau distillery is built, was originally founded as a sugar plantation by the Rimbaud family of Martinique at the end of the 19th century, after the emancipation of slaves in the French colonies. The estate was purchased by Roger Damoiseau in 1942 and transformed into a rhum agricole distillery, and is currently run by Roger's grandson, Hervé Damoiseau.

== Production ==
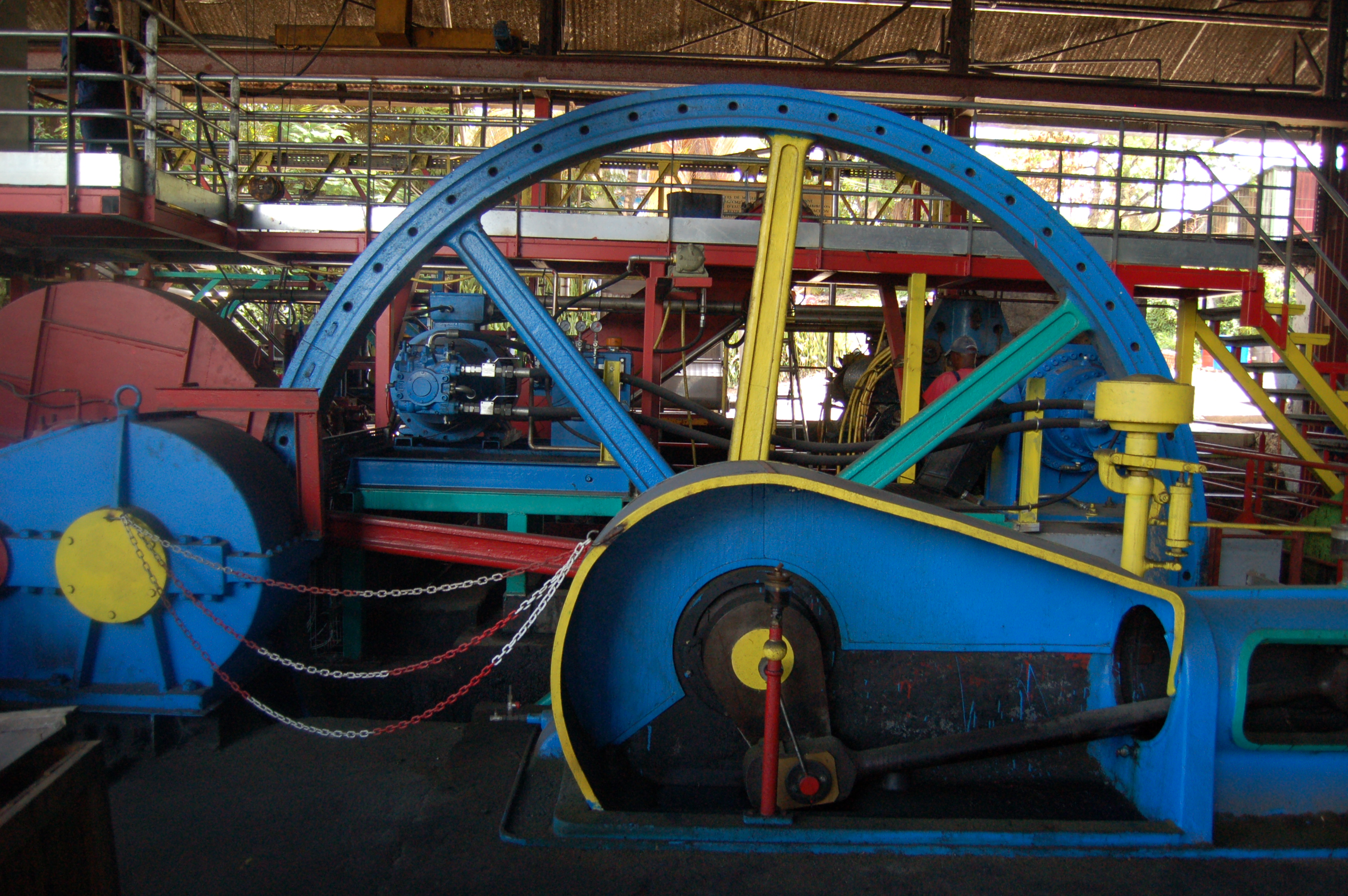
Factory machinery

Damoiseau rhums are produced from sugar cane that is harvested and crushed on the same day before fermenting for 24–36 hours. It is distilled in a continuous column still to between 86% and 88% alcohol, and then aged in charred oak barrels previously used for aging bourbon. After aging for six months or more than six years, the rum is diluted with local spring water to a consistent commercial proof and bottled.

In 2011, Damoiseau opened a bottling and storage facility near Pointe-à-Pitre International Airport in Les Abymes, Pointe-à-Pitre that is capable of storing up to 5 million bottles.

== Products ==
- Damoiseau Virgin Cane Rhum Agricole Blanc: (40% ABV) aged for six months in oak vats.
- Damoiseau Pure Cane Rhum 110: (55% ABV) aged for six months in oak vats.
- Damoiseau VSOP Rhum Vieux: (42% ABV) aged for a minimum of four years in ex-bourbon barrels.
- Damoiseau XO Rhum Vieux: (42% ABV) aged for a minimum of six years in ex-bourbon barrels.

== Recognition ==
In 2017, Damoiseau Virgin Cane won the gold medal for Rums Pure Juice & Blanc Agricole <50% ABV. Damoiseau XO Rhum Agricole received the Chairman's Trophy in the 2016 Ultimate Spirits Challenge.

== See also ==
- List of rum producers
- Ti' Punch
