= Diri djondjon =

Haitian dish of black mushrooms and rice

Diri djondjon (black mushroom rice) is a native dish of Haiti. It is essentially a meal consisting of rice made with edible black mushrooms called djondjon. The meal is more common in the northern region of the country and therefore can be considered a regional specialty.

When the mushrooms are boiled, they release a grayish-black coloring giving the rice its black color and the dish's distinctive flavor. The dish is often served with some sort of meat, whether it be fish, chicken, or shrimp (usually mixed in the rice).

== See also ==
- List of mushroom dishes
- Haitian cuisine
