= Dupré Barbancourt =

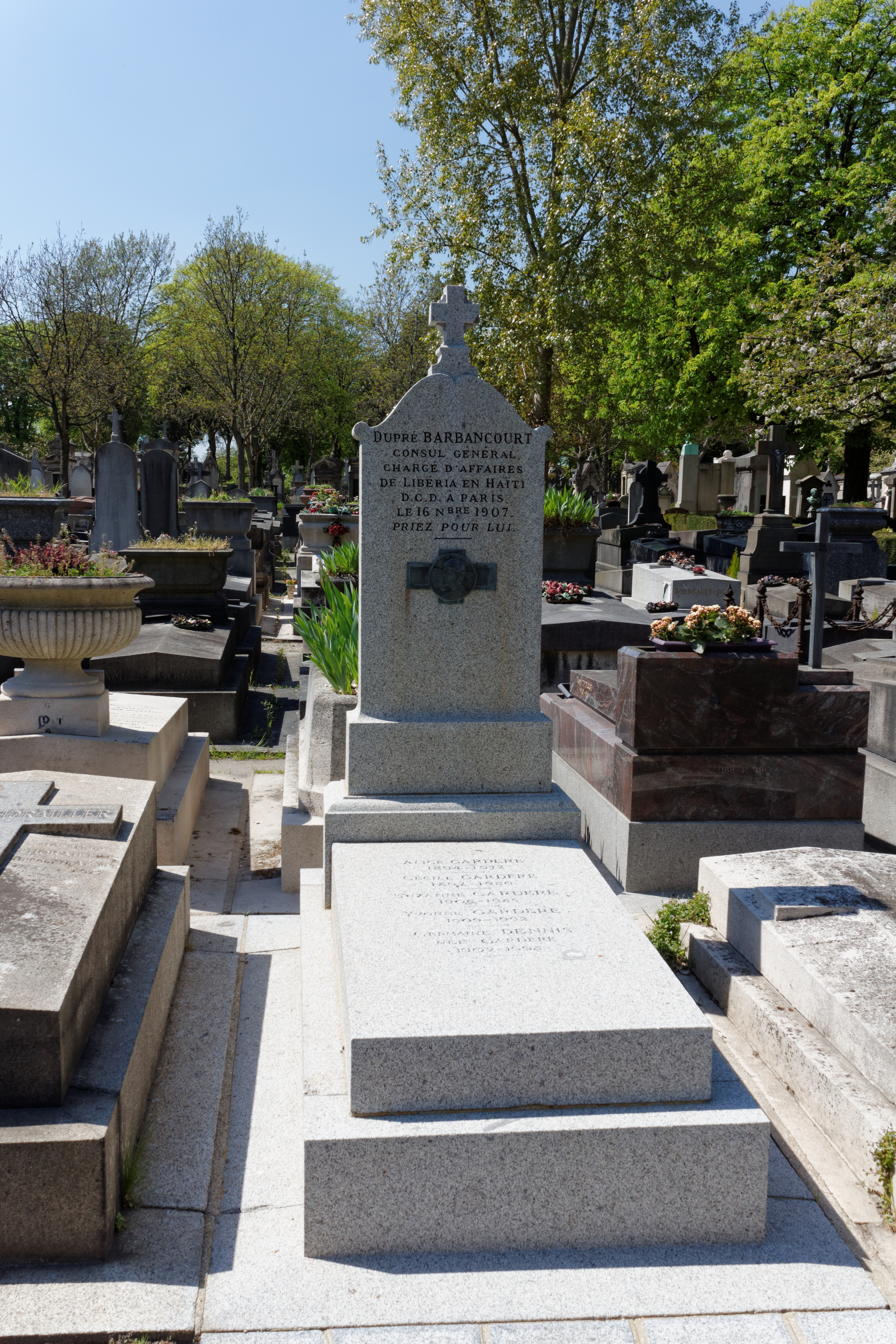
Dupré Barbancourt's tomb

Dupré Barbancourt (before ? – 1907) was the founder of the company Rhum Barbancourt and was also consul general of Liberia in Haiti.

He died in Paris and is buried in the Père Lachaise Cemetery (division 85).
