= Tchaka =

Haitian stew

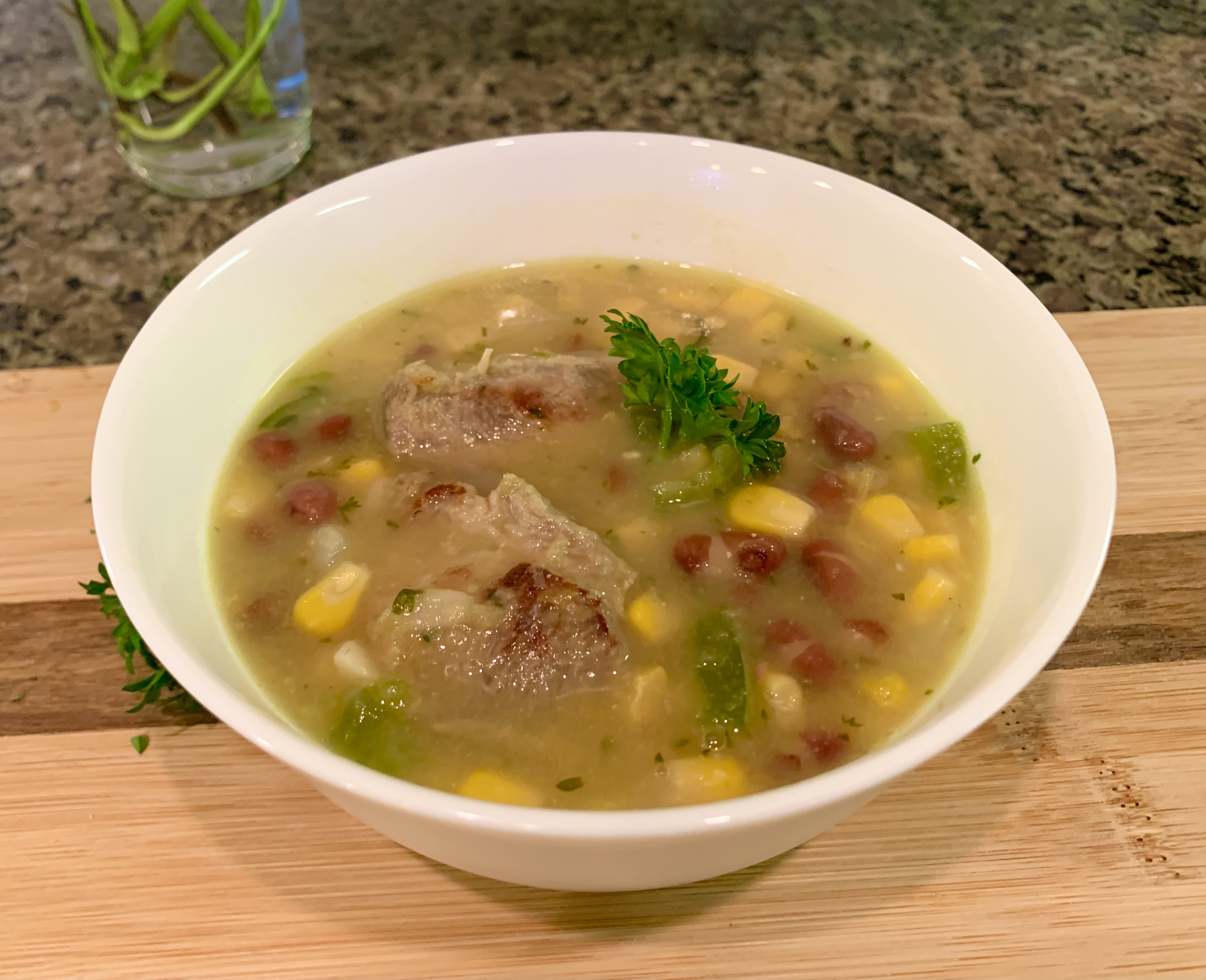
- Tchaka
- Alternative names: Chaka, tiaka, tyaka
- Type: Stew
- Place of origin: Haiti
- Main ingredients: Corn, beans, meat

Tchaka or Chaka is a Haitian stew made from hominy, beans, pumpkin (joumou), and meat (usually pork). The nutritious soup is also associated with festivities and family time.

== Background ==
Other names for the dish are tyaka, chaka, or tiaka depending on the region. Typical of Haitian cuisine, this dish has influences of many different cultures.

== Ingredients ==
The recipe is usually made with salted and smoked pork which imparts a great deal of flavor. This pork is from where most of the flavor comes. The parts of the pig that are used is traditionally the trotter, bacon, shoulder, palette, or loin.

Various beans can be used, including pinto, red kidney, small red, and dark red. Dried corn is used, where it can increase fourfold in volume when boiled in water.

== Preparation ==
Tchaka is relatively simple to make. However, it often requires several hours of preparation to allow flavors to develop and incorporate throughout the soup. Unlike other soups where the ingredients are prepared in the same pot, for tchaka, the ingredients are usually cooked separately before being combined. This is because the different ingredients have different cooking times. The red beans and corn are soaked for several hours. The pork is boiled then grilled in oil. Then the beans, corn, and meat are combined and simmered at low heat for about two hours. The tchaka is simmered to the desired consistency which is usually on the thicker side. Some add pumpkin to the tchaka, where a cooked piece of pumpkin is pureed and added to the other ingredients before simmering. The stew is served hot. It is sometimes served with a pickle on the side.

== Variations ==
Several other local variations exist which use beef, mutton, or crab instead of pork. Some recipes use coconut milk which provides a creamy consistency. Some recipes use squash, yam, or malanga.

== Culture and traditions ==
Tchaka is usually served during special occasions because it requires a relatively long time to prepare. For example, it can be served during family gatherings. It can also be served on November 1 for All Saints’ Day, on May 1 for Labor Day to honor Azakah Medeh, the loa of harvest and agriculture. In Haitian Vodou, tchaka was the favorite dish of this loa.

Tchaka was mentioned in a song by Haitian musician, Sydney Guillaume, when he wrote:

“Chofe dife! Nou pral manje tchaka! Chofe dife, brase mayi, pa bliye tisale, Nou pral manje yon bon tchaka. Nou pral voye monte yon bouyon tèt chaje” (“Light the fire! We will eat tchaka! Light the fire, mix the corn, don’t forget the salted pork, we will eat a delicious tchaka, we will cook an incredible stew”).

Haitians oftentimes cook tchaka during school vacations since it is protein-rich and thought to help with children's growth.

== See also ==
- List of soups
