= Coffee production in Haiti =

Haitian woman straining coffee

Coffee production in Haiti has been important to its economy since the early 18th century, when the French brought the coffee plant to the colony, then known as Saint-Domingue. It has been a principal crop of Haiti ever since. Alongside sugar, coffee long formed the backbone of early Haiti's economy. At the present day, coffee has fallen behind both mango and cocoa in terms of export value.

== History ==
Graph of coffee bean production in Haiti between 1961 and 2023

Coffee cultivation was first introduced to Haiti in 1715, as hardier plants from Martinique was later brought in and further developed.

The story of de Clieu's introduction of coffee comes from his account in the Année littéraire of 1774. According to this account, he arranged to transport a coffee plant (or perhaps several) from the greenhouses of the Jardin royal des plantes (which had originally received two plants from Holland in the 1710s) to Martinique in 1720. (Note: Some sources claim that one of the Dutch seedlings had originally came from Surinam.) According to de Clieu's account, water was rationed on the voyage, and he shared his ration with the seedlings. The story is repeated in many histories of coffee. However, a recent history points out that though it may well be true that de Clieu brought a seedling to Martinique, and perhaps even that he shared his water ration with it, coffee was already growing in the Western Hemisphere: in the French colony of Saint-Domingue since 1715 and in the Dutch colony of Surinam since 1718.

As a former French colony, coffee was first cultivated in Haiti (then Saint-Domingue) in 1734, and by 1788 it supplied half the world's coffee.

The conditions that the slaves worked in on coffee plantations were a factor in the soon-to-follow Haitian Revolution that broke out in 1791. By 1801, most plantations were burnt down. Haitian revolutionary Toussaint Louverture attempted to revive the production that declined 45% from 1789 levels and instituted a fermage system, similar to serfdom; confined to state-owned plantations. However, when Napoleon began to send troops between 1801–1803 in a failed attempt to regain the territory, the coffee plantations were again abandoned. When learning of the final defeat of his troops in 1803, Napoleon angrily shouted, "Damn coffee!" Damn colonies!".

Coffee in Port-au-Prince, Haiti (1928)

In 1920, Vice President of the National City Bank, John H. Allen, wrote about Haiti in "The Americas" and said:

Up to two years ago, Haitian coffee was never wanted in this market, whereas in Europe it was in strong demand. Recently, a demand has developed here for this excellent grade of coffee, which when properly prepared, is superior to the majority of other grades.

Coffee production has been hurt by natural disasters, as well as United States-led embargoes against the governments of François and Jean-Claude Duvalier. Duvalier's dictatorship made it so that the coffee farmers of Haiti were too afraid to come down from the mountains to sell their crops. The machinery began to rust and the skills needed to harvest the coffee trees were lost in the generations. Following the movement away from Haitian coffee production, Brazil moved in and took control of the world coffee market.

With brief comebacks in 1850 where coffee was a major export of Haiti, or in 1949 when it rose to the world's third major producer, the market has continued to go through continuous boom and bust cycles. Haiti's coffee competitiveness suffered internationally. The continuous shifts in the coffee market led to Haitians burning their coffee trees to make charcoal, hoping that would improve economic wealth. When Haiti was a main world contributor of coffee, 80 percent of the labour force was involved in agriculture. In the 1980s the percentage of the population that was involved in agriculture dropped to 66%. Those who were not involved in the agricultural aspect of the crop still took part in the production of coffee through marketing, or being middlemen or exporters.

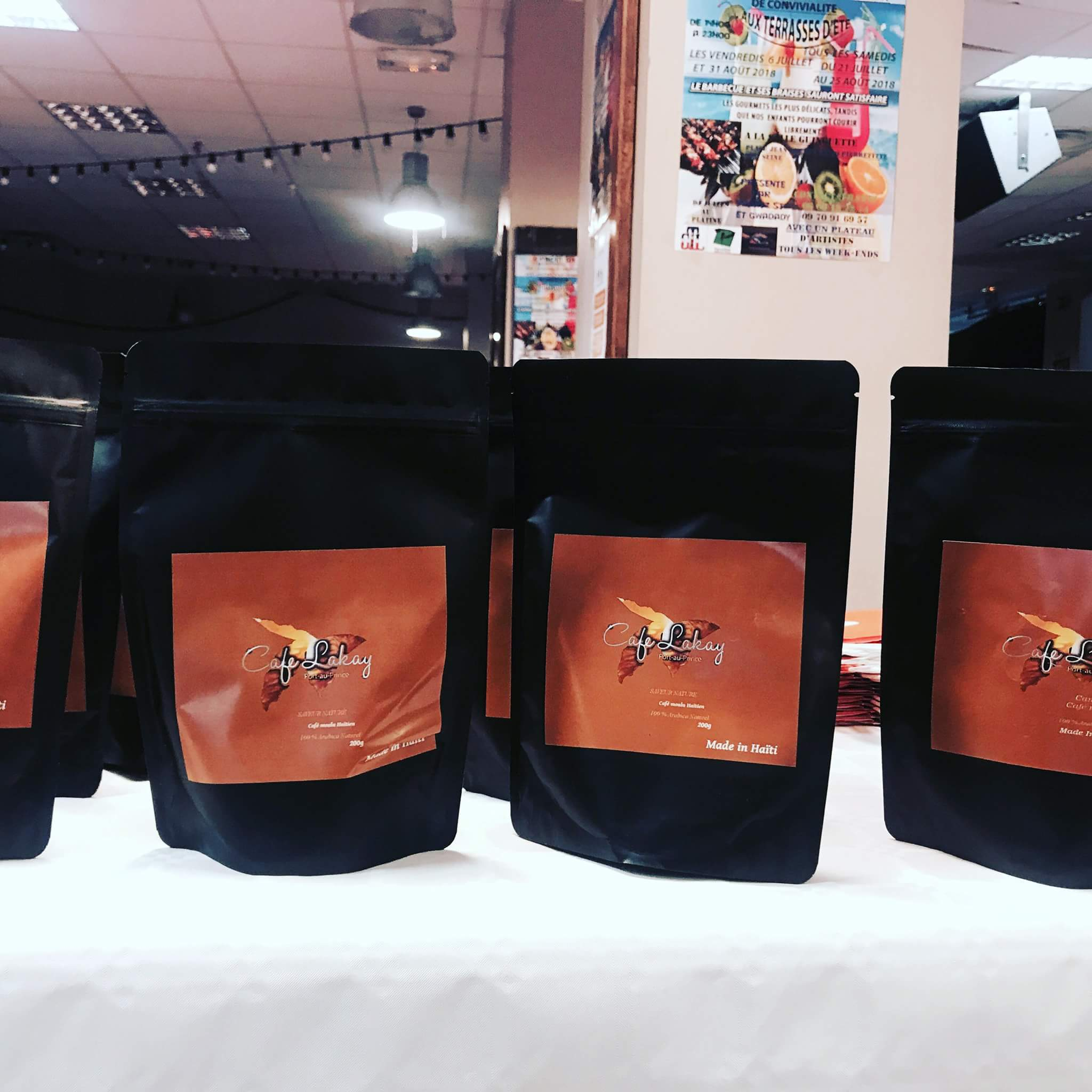
Fair-trade coffee in Haiti

In the 21st century, agriculture was penalized due to difficult climatic conditions. Haiti has suffered from soil erosion as well as deforestation, which affects the growth of coffee crops. In addition to ongoing cycles of floods and droughts, Haiti has been the victim of many natural disasters. In 2010, Haiti was hit by a 7.0 magnitude earthquake that left the country in desolation and played a big role in the decrease of coffee production.

However, the continual rise in demand has eased Haiti back into the world coffee scene through the implementation of fair trade policies that have contributed to its attempt at restoration. The profile of Haitian coffee has grown and has been advantageous for small-scale Haitian farmers, as specialty coffee has drawn the attention of a growing trend of socially-aware western consumers receiving a premium on the world market stage adopting strategies that have heightened its value, such as origin-labeling, high quality differentiation techniques such as fair trade, gourmet, and organic, in order to meet these demands and capitalizing on their higher willingness to pay.

== See also ==
- List of countries by coffee production
