= Pikliz =

Haitian condiment

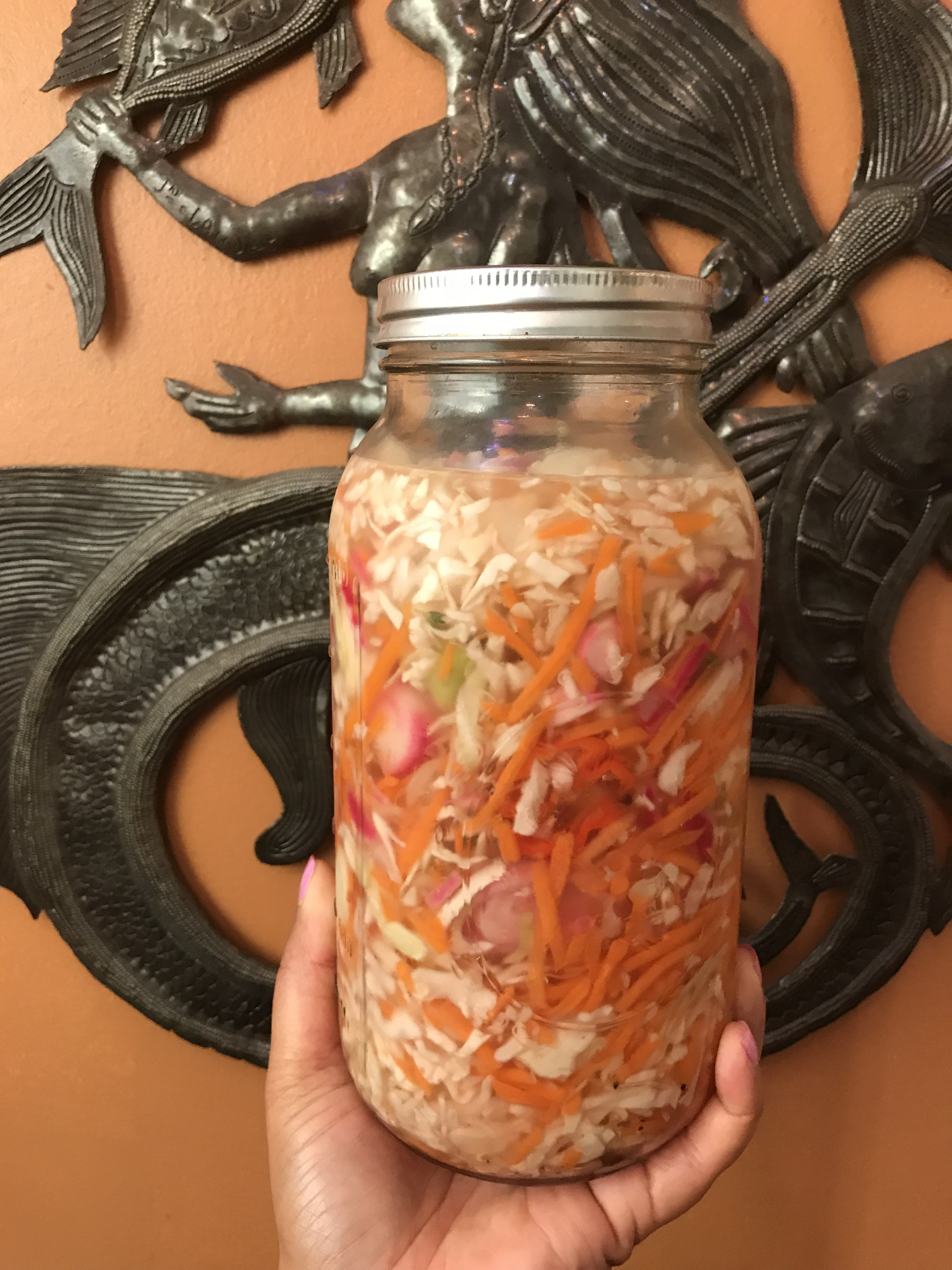
- Pikliz
- Alternative names: Picklese, Pickled scotch bonnet peppers, Haitian slaw
- Type: Condiment
- Place of origin: Haiti
- Main ingredients: Scotch bonnet peppers, carrots, onions, bell peppers, vinegar

Pikliz is a pickled condiment in Haitian cuisine. It can be eaten fresh or fermented for taste and health benefit. Pikliz (pronounced PEE-kleez) can be understood based on the word pickle and the French word piquer (meaning to sting). The base ingredients include cabbage, carrots, bell peppers, garlic, onion, and Scotch bonnet peppers, pickled in white vinegar and/or citrus juice.

The spicy dish is commonly served alongside other dishes to enhance the flavor. It is useful as a side condiment for fritay or fried foods such as griot (fried pork), tassot (fried beef), or bannann peze (fried plantains) and enhancing rice and beans.
It has traditionally been produced at the household level, but it is increasingly produced industrially as the number of Haitians living abroad also increases.

== Etymology ==
The name of the dish itself may be based on the French word piquer which means 'to sting'. Also known simply as piment la kay.

== Variations ==
- White Onions
- Red Onions
- Shallots
- Beetroot
- Habanero peppers
- Chicken stock

== See also ==
- Curtido
- Kimchi
- Fermented foods
- Pickled foods
