= Akasan =

Haitian beverage

Akasan (sometimes AK 100) is a popular Haitian beverage made from corn kernels, anise stars, vanilla and cinnamon. It is drunk either warm or cold, often as a breakfast beverage. Akasan is known for its rich sweetness and thickness.
