= Ti' punch =

Cocktail

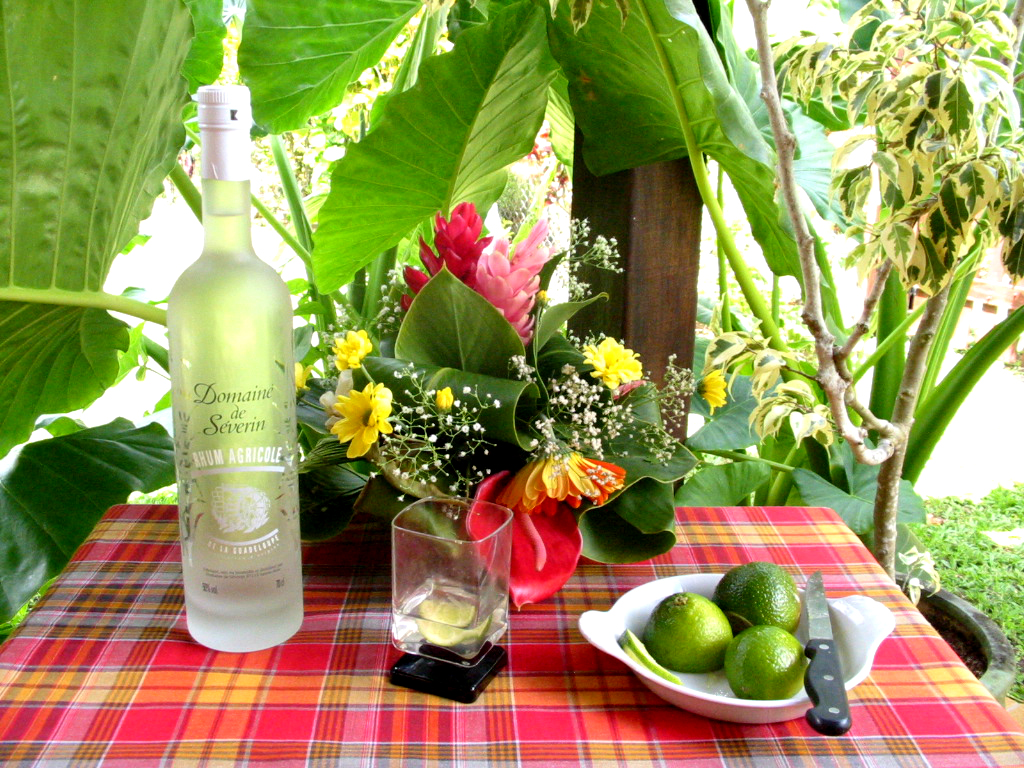
A Ti' punch layout, allowing guests to assemble their own drink.

Ti' punch (Haitian Creole: Ti ponch, [ti pɔ̃ʃ]; French: Petit Ponch) literally meaning "small punch", is a rum-based mixed drink that is especially popular in Martinique, Guadeloupe, Saint Martin, Haiti, French Guiana, Réunion, Saint Lucia, and other French-speaking Caribbean islands. It is also the national cocktail of Martinique and Guadeloupe. It is very similar to the daiquiri, which is usually identified with Cuba, and the caipirinha, identified with Brazil. The ti' punch is distinguished from these by its use of rhum agricole, and by typically having less lime juice.

The drink is traditionally made with white rhum agricole, lime, and cane syrup. While aged rhum agricole can be used in place of white rhum agricole, other fruit flavors may be added on top of the lime, and sugar may be substituted for cane syrup, a Ti' punch can only be made with rhum agricole.

== Service ==
Ti' punch is usually served as an apéritif. A popular tradition is that of chacun prépare sa propre mort ("each prepares their own death"), in which the bartender or host provides glassware, syrup, limes, and rum but does not prepare the drink so that each drinker may build their own to their taste. Ti' punch predates the wide availability of ice in the Caribbean, and both the traditional neat and contemporary iced preparation are prevalent today.

== See also ==
- Caipirinha – similar Brazilian drink
- Daiquiri – similar Cuban drink
