= Djondjon =

Haitian edible black mushroom

Djondjon (also spelled djon djon or djon-djon) is the common name for certain edible mushrooms used as a delicacy in some Haitian dishes, such as diri djondjon. The name djondjon does not refer to a single species of mushroom, but is rather a colloquial name for a group of several edible, taxonomically distinct species. However, some researchers suggest that the most common species is likely Psathyrella cf. hymenocephala. Species from the Cantharellus and Inocybe genera have also been identified within products sold at Haitian markets.

The mushrooms are also sold in some parts of the United States — Gene Yetter of the New Jersey Mycological Association and New York Mycological Society reported that in the year 2001 he found them being sold dried in New York for a few dollars per quarter ounce.

== Use in cooking ==
When cooked, djondjon mushrooms give the dish that they are in an "exquisite color, taste, and aroma." Before cooking, the inedible stems are removed from the dried mushrooms and only the caps are used. Djondjon are often served on top of a mixture of rice and pork or a mixture of rice and fish. Boiling the mushrooms releases a grayish-black color substance the water, which can then be used to flavor and color the dish they are mixed into. Dishes utilizing the fungi are often served in Haiti on special occasions, such as birthdays, weddings, or on Christmas.

Haitians living abroad will often buy the dried mushrooms from grocery stores located in areas with a large Haitian population, though sometimes they may use a flavored bouillon cube produced by the German company Maggi as an alternative.
