= Creole sauce =

Haitian, Creole, and New Orleans cuisine sauce

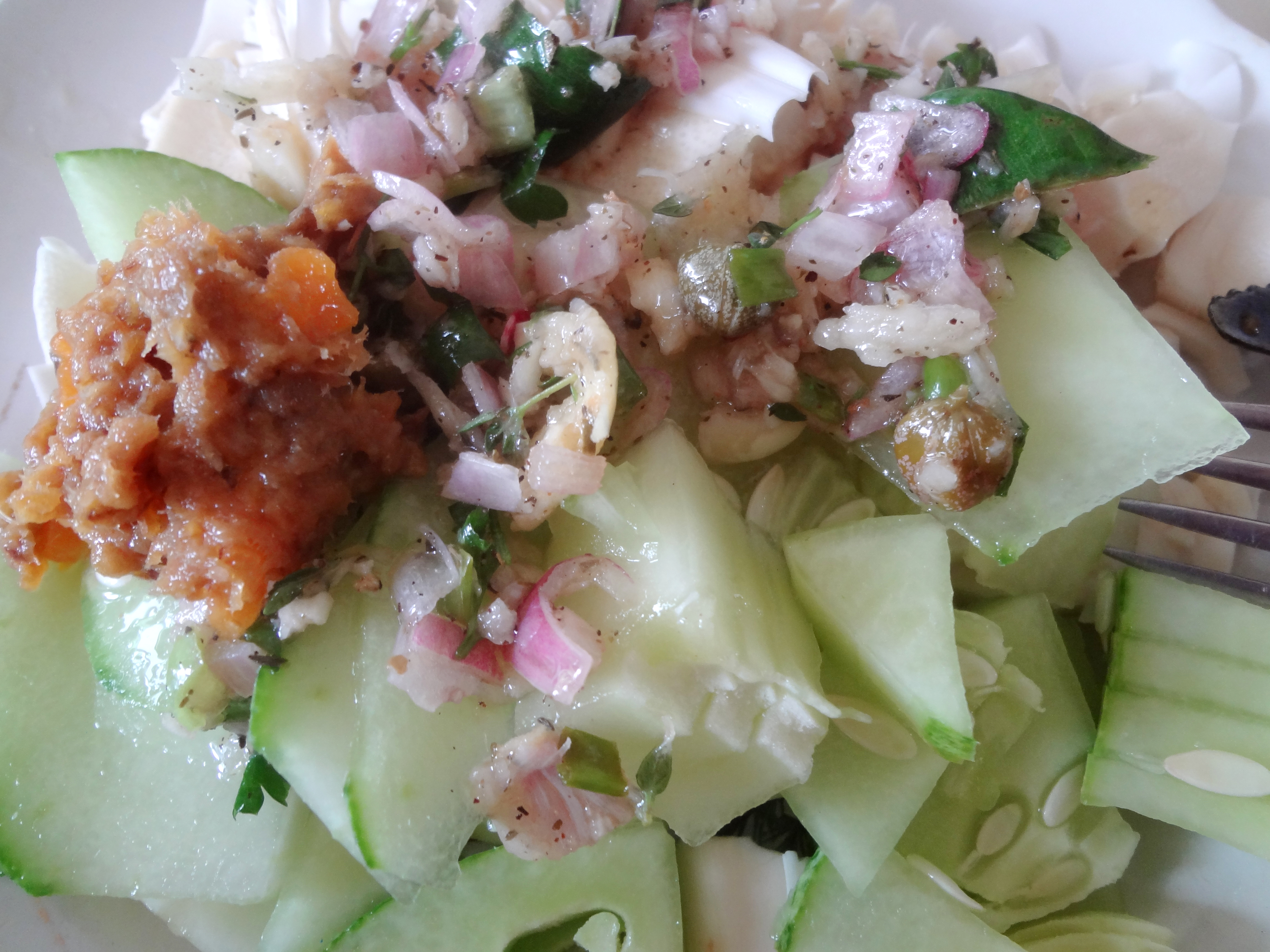
Salad with Creole sauce

Creole sauce, also referred to as "red gravy", creole tomato sauce, and sauce piquante in New Orleans, is a Creole cuisine, Haitian cuisine, and New Orleans cuisine sauce made by sauteeing vegetables in butter and olive oil. It is used in the American south. It is made with tomatoes, the Cajun holy trinity (celery, bell peppers, and onions), garlic, seasonings, and herbs. Stock (usually chicken) is also used, and it is seasoned with cayenne, hot sauce, bay leaf, salt, black pepper, thyme, and parsley.

== See also ==
- Creole cuisine
- Bahamian cuisine
