= Griot (food) =

Dish in Haitian cuisine

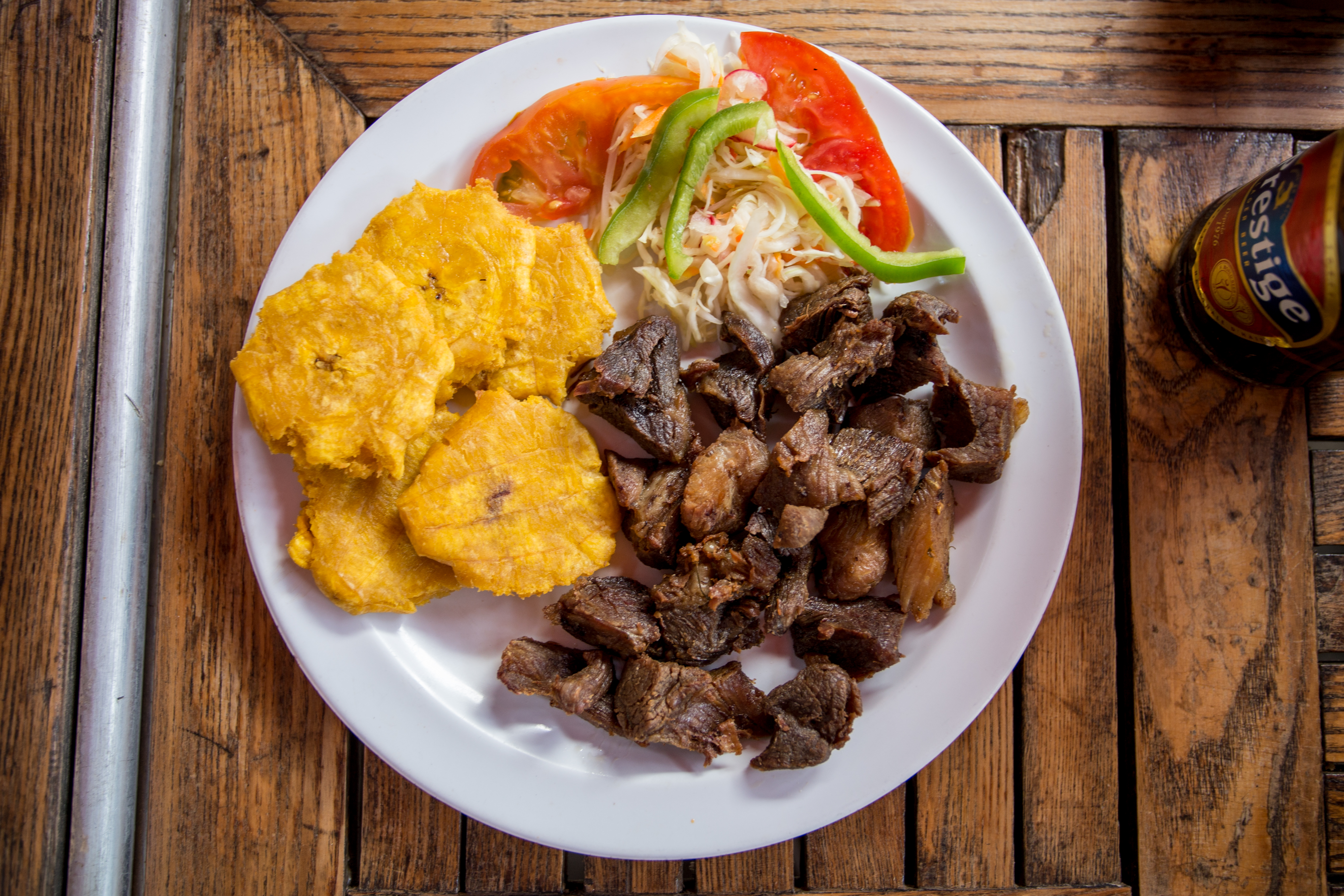
- Griot served with bannann peze and pikliz
- Place of origin: Haiti
- Serving temperature: Hot
- Main ingredients: Pork shoulder, citrus, scotch bonnet peppers
- Similar dishes: Carnitas, Pernil

Griot (/ɡriˈoʊ/; French: griot, Haitian Creole: griyo [gɣijo]) is a dish in Haitian cuisine. It consists of pork shoulder marinated in citrus, which is braised and then fried. It is commonly served at parties. Griot along with diri ak pwa wouj (red beans and rice) is considered by some to be Haiti's "national dish."

== Etymology ==
Griot may also be spelled griyo, or grillots.

== Preparation ==
Griot is usually made from pork shoulder. The meat is first washed then put in a mixture of citrus juices to add flavor. After being soaked in the citrus juices, the meat is marinated in epis, which is a mixture of Haitian herbs, vegetables, and spices. Next, the meat is either braised or roasted until tender. The cooking liquid produced is used in the preparation of an accompanying sauce, known as sòs ti-malis. Finally, the meat is deep-fried until golden-brown and crispy. Griot is almost always served with pikliz as well as rice or bannann peze.

== See also ==
- List of pork dishes
