= Epis =

Paste used in Haitian cuisine

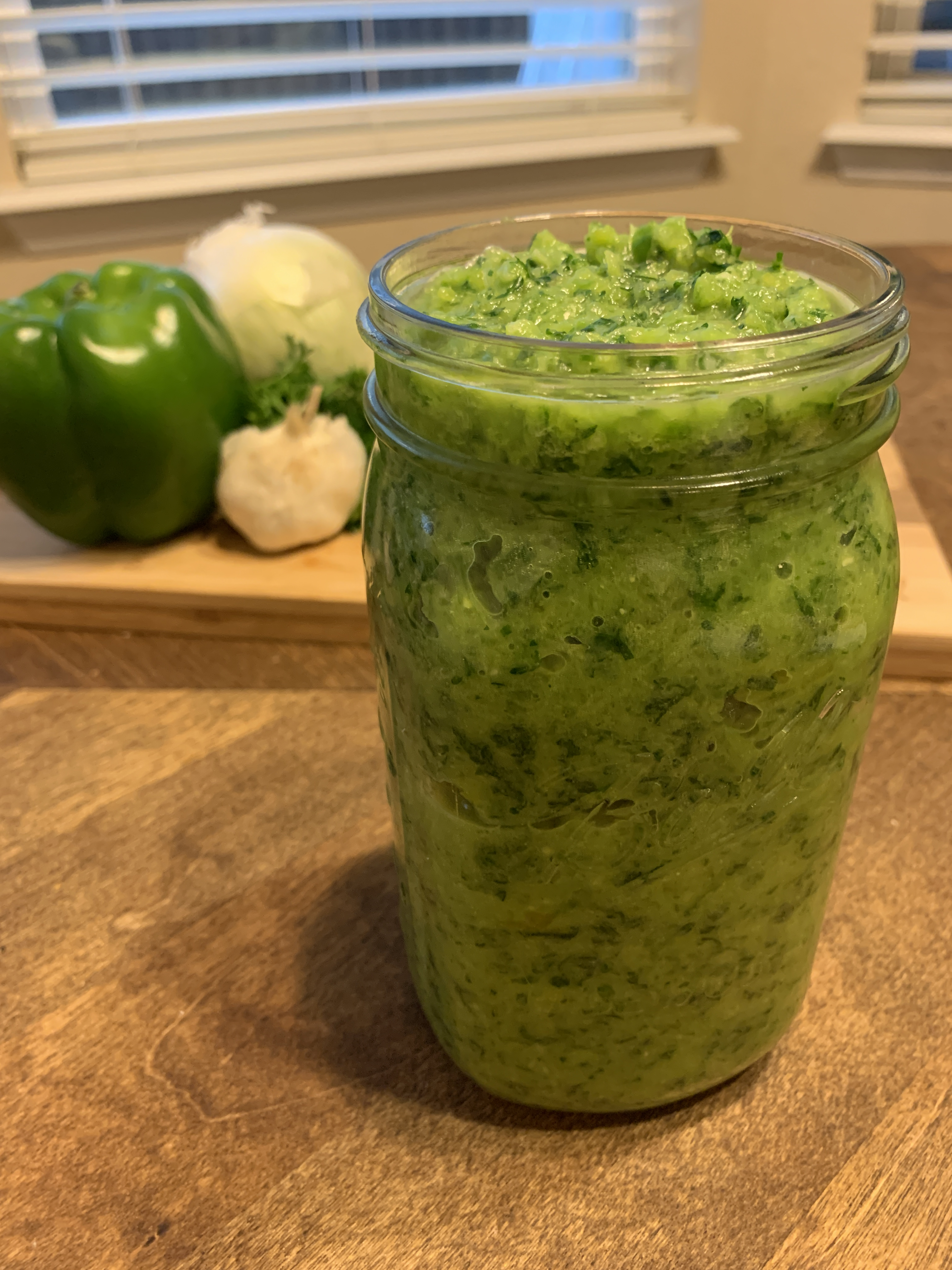
- Epis
- Alternative names: Epise, zepis
- Type: Flavor base
- Place of origin: Haiti
- Main ingredients: Bell peppers, garlic, citrus juice, parsley, and other herbs and spices

Epis (/ˈɛpiːs/; Haitian Creole: epis) is a blend of peppers, garlic, and herbs that is used as a flavor base for many foods in Haitian cuisine. Some refer to it as a pesto sauce. It is also known as epise and zepis. It is essential to Haitian cuisine.

== Background ==
Epis has Taino and African origins. It also has similarities to sofrito which is used in Hispanic cuisine. This use of a flavor base is common in Caribbean cuisine.

== Ingredients ==
Epis often contains parsley, scallions, garlic, citrus juice, and Scotch bonnet peppers. Many recipes also contain vinegar, cloves, thyme, allspice, bouillon cubes, and onion. Numerous recipes for epis exist, as traditionally, Haitian women would cook and have their personal epis recipe. Also, various regions have different recipes.

== Preparation ==
Traditionally, epis is made with a large wooden mortar and pestle (called munsh pilon). Today, it is often made with a blender. The ingredients are blended until the consistency is as smooth as desired.

== Use ==
It can be used as a marinade for meat. It can also marinate fish. It also is added to flavor a number of Haitian dishes. This includes rice and beans, soups, and stews. It is a convenient way to utilize flavors from fresh herbs and spices in everyday cooking. Many Haitians have epis available on hand to be used for various dishes.

=== Dishes ===
- Griot
- Haitian spaghetti

== Storage ==
Epis can last up to three months in the refrigerator, but this time will vary depending on the ingredients that are used. The acidity helps keep the ingredients from spoiling. Epis will last indefinitely in the freezer and will not transfer its odor to other freezer items. The epis can be distributed in an ice cube tray and frozen, so that the frozen cubes can be used in future cooking.

== See also ==
- Sofrito
- Holy trinity
- Tempering (spices)
- Mirepoix
- Sauce
