= Rhum Barbancourt =

Rum produced from Haitian sugar cane juice

Société du Rhum Barbancourt
- Type: Private
- Founded: 18 March 1862; 164 years ago
- Founder: Dupré Barbancourt
- Headquarters: Port-au-Prince, Haiti
- Area served: Worldwide
- Products: Rum
- Revenue: $45 million+ per year
- Owner: Delphine Nathalie Gardère, CEO
- Website: barbancourt.com

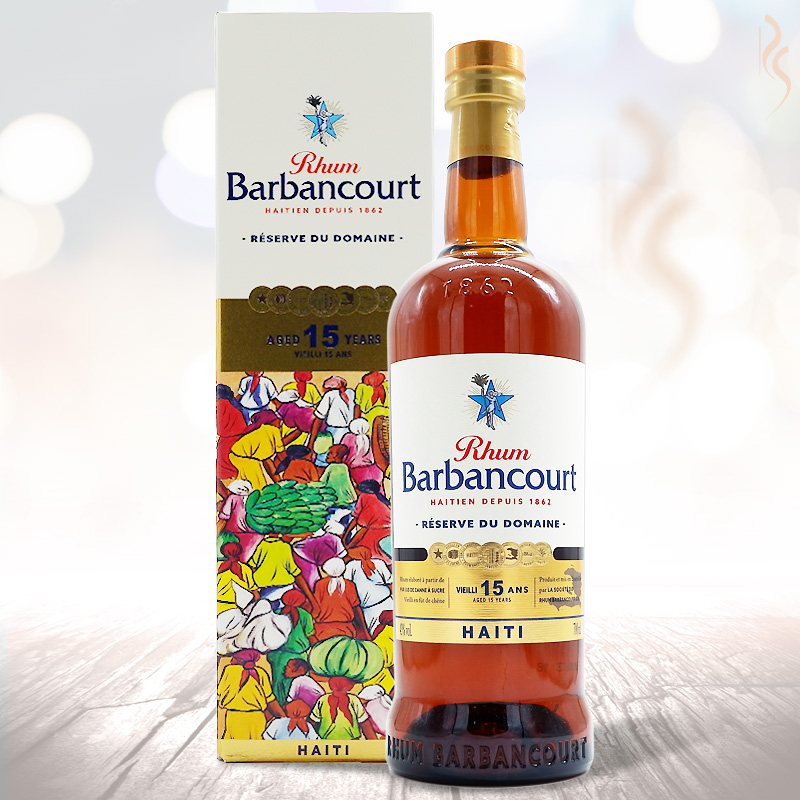

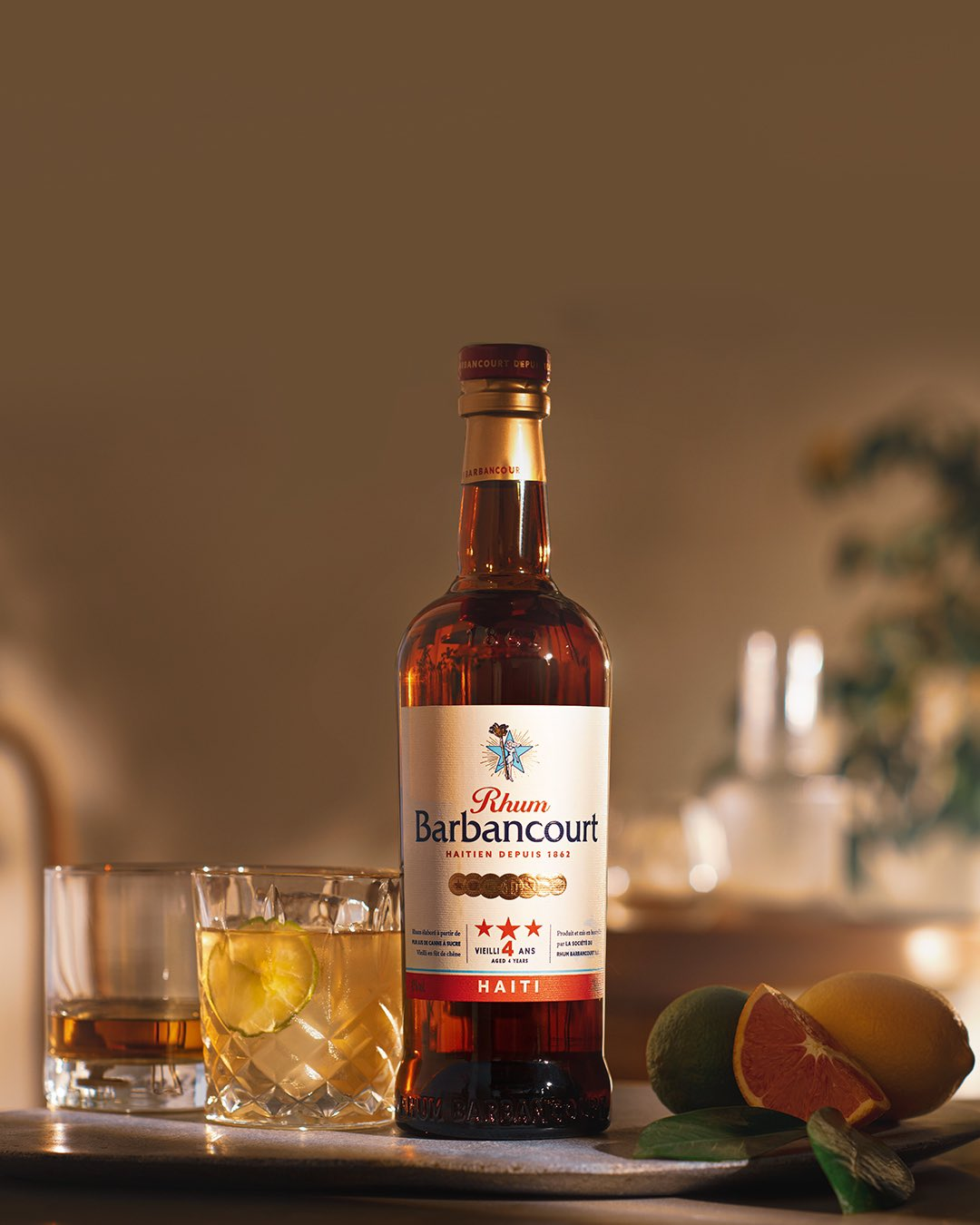

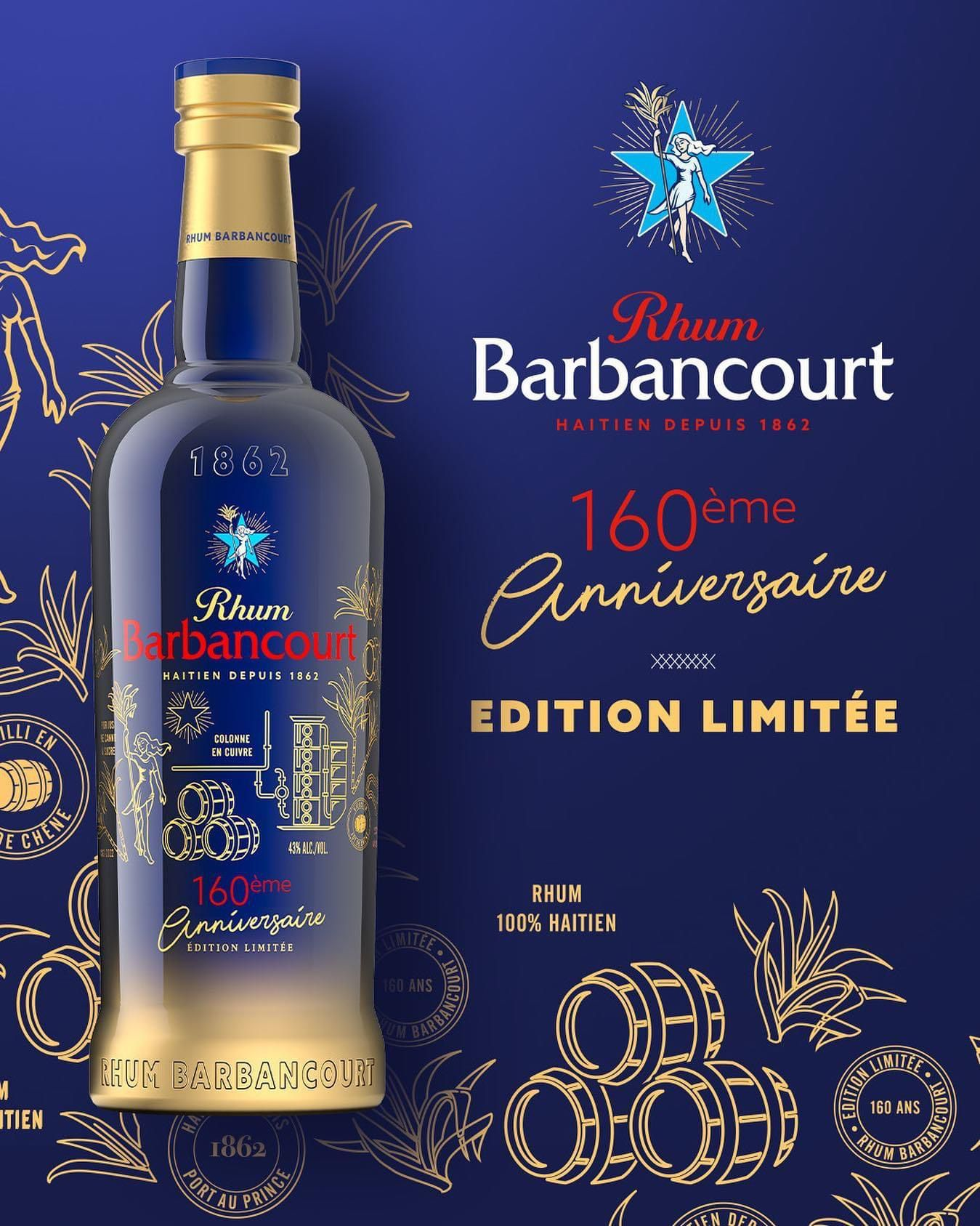

Rhum Barbancourt is rum produced from pure sugar cane juice and bottled in Haiti by Société du Rhum Barbancourt. The distillery is one of Haiti's oldest institutions, and its rum is the country's most famous export, widely regarded as among the finest rums in the world for over 150 years.

== Company history ==
The family business began on March 18, 1862, producing rum directly from sugar cane juice. Dupré Barbancourt, from the cognac-producing region of Charente founded the distillery in 1862. After learning how to make rum in December of that year, he soon began selling it for HTG 1.50 (USD $0.30) per gallon.

When Dupré Barbancourt died, the distillery passed to his wife Nathalie Gardère who managed it with the help of her nephew Paul Gardère. When she died, Paul then directed the company until his death in 1946, when his son Jean Gardère took up the baton, furthering the family tradition until 1990. When Jean passed, Thierry Gardère took over, becoming the fourth generation of the Gardère family to lead the company. Upon the death of Thierry Gardère on March 1, 2017, Delphine Nathalie Gardère succeeded her father as CEO of Barbancourt.

During the 2010 Haitian earthquake, two workers died, about 86 lost their houses, many aging barrels were destroyed, halting the rum production, and rum supply and prices were affected. By May 2010 however, production had already resumed.

In November 2020, Delphine Nathalie Gardère announced that she now owned 100% of the shares of Société du Rhum Barbancourt through a Leverage Buy-Out of all the other Gardère family members.

== Expansion and operations ==
In 1949, the company relocated to the heart of the sugar cane fields of the Domaine Barbancourt in the plaine du Cul-de-Sac region. By 1952, the successful company ramped up production, transforming itself from what once was a cottage industry into a major producer of high-quality rum. The rum is double distilled, using a process similar to that used to produce cognac.

Barbancourt is made directly from sugar cane juice rather than the sugar cane by-product molasses. This is similar to the rhum agricole of Martinique, which is strictly controlled by law. Fermenting fresh sugar cane juice provides a more flavorful product.

Barbancourt's products are highly regarded and have won many world competitions with excellent reviews from rum connoisseurs. The Réserve du Domaine / Estate Reserve is aged 15 years. Other popular products include the 5 Star Réserve Spéciale aged for eight years, the 3 Star Rhum aged four years, and a clear, white rhum, all made from fresh sugar cane juice.

Barbancourt's rums are marketed in 20 countries, namely the Caribbean, Europe, the United States, Canada, France, and Italy. Barbancourt is Haiti's best-known export.

== Barbancourt Leadership ==
1. Dupré Barbancourt 1862-1907
2. Nathalie Gardère (wife of Dupré Barbancourt) 1907-1928
3. Paul Gardère (nephew of Nathalie Gardère) 1928 - 1946
4. Jean Gardère (son of Paul Gardère) 1946 -1990
5. Thierry Gardère (son of Jean Gardère) 1990-2017
6. Delphine Nathalie Gardère (daughter of Thierry Gardère) 2017 to present.

== Products ==
- Rhum Barbancourt 3-Star (aged 4 years)
- Rhum Barbancourt 5-Star (aged 8 years)
- Rhum Barbancourt Estate Reserve (aged 15 years)
- White Rhum

== See also ==
- Rhum agricole
