= Rhum agricole =

Liquor

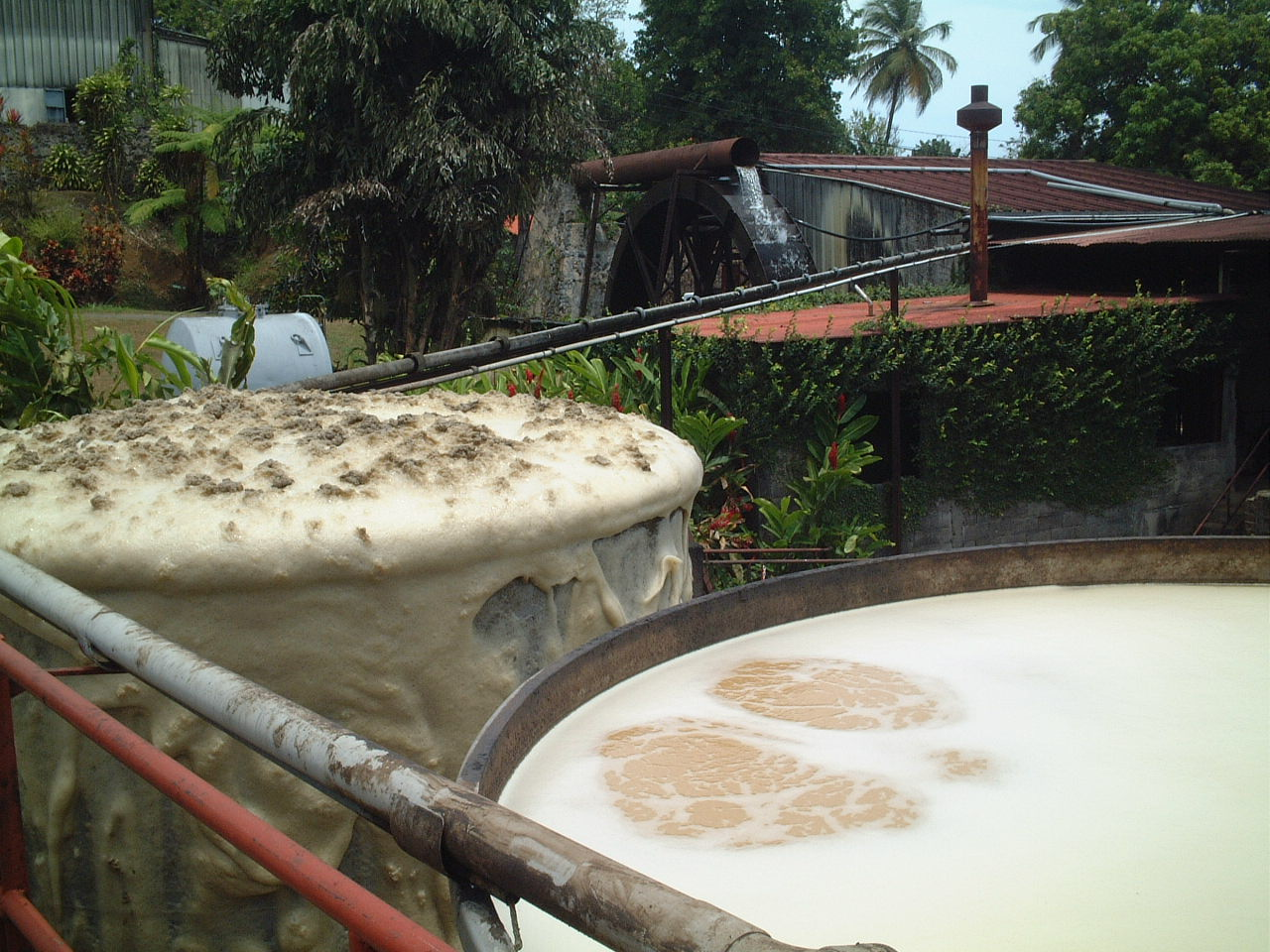
Sugarcane juice in fermentation tanks, Guadeloupe

Rhum agricole (French pronunciation: [ʁɔm aɡʁikɔl]) is the French term for sugarcane juice rum, a style of rum originally distilled in the French Caribbean islands from freshly squeezed sugarcane juice rather than molasses. The term agricole, which translates to 'agricultural', differentiates this rum from rum made with molasses in French-speaking locales.

== Overview ==
Cane juice rum mostly comes from Haiti, Martinique, and the Guadeloupe islands of Marie-Galante, Grande-Terre, and Basse-Terre, but is made throughout the Caribbean including in Trinidad, Panama, the Dominican Republic and Grenada; in the Indian Ocean on Mauritius and Réunion Island; and in the Pacific Ocean on the islands of Hawaii and French Polynesia, and in Vanuatu.

Most rum is made from molasses, a byproduct of sugar refining. When France began to make sugar from sugar beets around 1811, sugar prices dropped and the debt-ridden sugar factories in the French Caribbean could not survive solely on sugar production. Fresh cane juice was now available for fermenting and distilling into rum. Martinican producers of cane-juice rums made entirely in Martinique and meeting certain production standards are entitled under French law to the appellation d'origine contrôlée (French protected designation of origin) "AOC Martinique Rhum Agricole". This designation is unique to Martinique and does not define the category of cane juice rum or rhum agricole.

La Martiniquaise was founded by Jean Cayard in 1934 as an importer of Martinique rums and is now the second largest liquor company in France. There are four distilleries in Basse-Terre, Guadeloupe, including Bologne founded by the father of the Chevalier de Saint-Georges. In Grande-Terre, Guadeloupe, there is Distillerie Damoiseau and in Marie-Galante there are Distillerie Bellevue, Distillerie Bielle, and Distillerie Poisson (also known as Rhum du Père Labat).

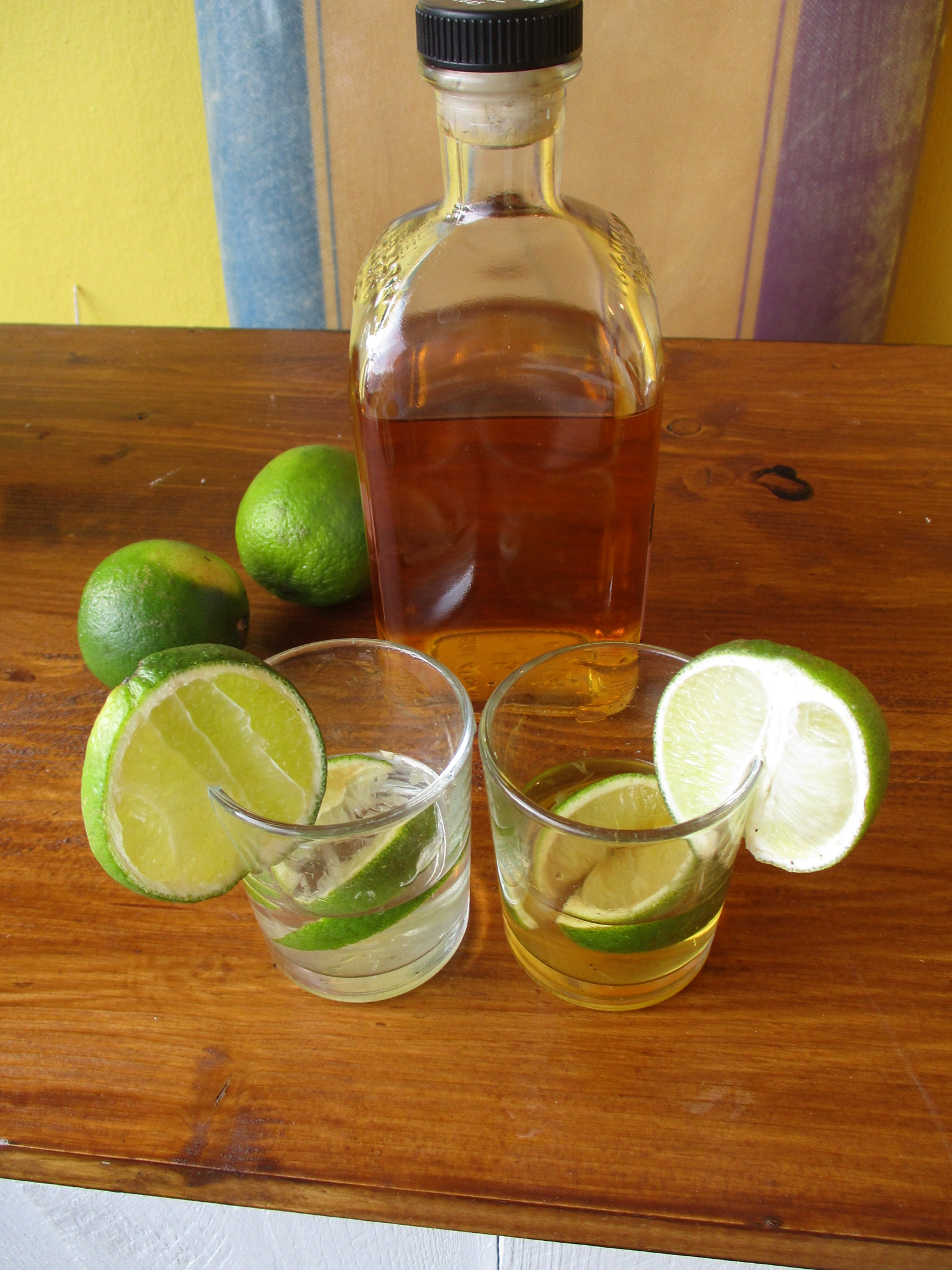
Ti' punch, a rhum agricole cocktail, made from rhum blanc (left) and rhum ambré (right)

The rest of the Caribbean produces cane juice rums of varying ages. Most notable are the Barbancourt rums of Haiti which are aged to four, eight, and fifteen years. There are five hundred village cottage industry producers of clairin. A form of cane juice rum first appeared in Brazil where it is called cachaça. With the burgeoning craft distilling scene, new world styles of rhum agricole are appearing. New World rhum agricole distilleries include The Distillery Phuket (which produces Chalong Bay Rum) and Lamai Distilleries in Thailand and Chamarel in Mauritius. With the closure of Hawaii's crystalline sugar producing mills, some artisanal distilleries have opened which continue production of cane for rhum agricole.

Rhum agricole is also produced in Taiwan.

== See also ==
- Cachaça
- Clairin
- Ti' punch
