= National Rums of Jamaica =

Jamaican rum distillery

National Rums of Jamaica, Ltd.
- Type: Private
- Industry: Distilled beverages
- Founded: 1980
- Key people: Martha Miller (CEO)
- Products: Rum
- Website: https://monymuskrums.com/

National Rums of Jamaica is a private company, founded in 1980 to serve as a holding company for failing Jamaican rum distilleries, and to legally separate them from the sugar estates that own them. It is one of the largest producers of rum in the Caribbean and exports 60% of the island's bulk rum, mostly to major brands such as Diageo's Captain Morgan and Sazerac's Myers's Rum. The company is jointly owned in equal shares by the state-run Sugar Company of Jamaica (SCJ), the West Indies Rum Distillery, and Demerara Distillers, following partial privatization from the SCJ's original complete ownership. Currently, NRJ owns the Long Pond Distillery outright, and 73% of Clarendon Distillers Ltd., and it owned Innswood Distillery until it was shuttered. Besides supplying bulk rum, NRJ also ages and sells rum under its own house brand, Monymusk.

== History ==
=== Clarendon/Monymusk ===
The Monymusk Estate (Monymusk) was a sugar plantation and sugarcane mill located in Lionel Town, Clarendon Parish at the southern end of Jamaica. Originally established in 1755, rum has been produced at Monymusk since between 1794 and 1807, and sugar has been produced at the sugar factory since 1901.

In 1884, Monymusk was purchased by Appleton Estate owner Colonel Charles James Ward. Ownership was transferred to the Lindo Brothers in 1916, who created the Applemony brand of rum, a portmanteau of Appleton and Monymusk. In 1928, the estate was sold to Clarendon Plantation, Ltd., who sold it to United Fruit Company the following year. Despite producing rum for over 200 years, the vast majority of it is sold to third parties rather than to its own house brand. In 1936, the estate was again sold to a joint venture between WISTCO and Clarendon Plantation, Ltd., before Clarendon Plantation, Ltd. sold its share to WISTCO the following year in 1937.

A new distillery was built at Monymusk in 1938, and then another distillery was built in 1949. In 1976, the state-run Sugar Company of Jamaica (SCJ) took over the estate to prevent its collapse, and in 1978 the rum operations were separated from the sugar operations and renamed to Clarendon Distillers Ltd. (Clarendon). In 1980, the SCJ merged Clarendon with Long Pond and Innswood under the umbrella company National Rums of Jamaica. From 2006-2009, following the government's partial divestment from NRJ and with investment by the European Union's Caribbean Rum Sector Program, Clarendon was upgraded with a new fermentation building and a multi-column still, a 25,000 L (5,500 imp gal; 6,600 US gal) copper double-retort pot still, a new boiler and 500kW steam turbine, water treatment plant, wastewater disposal system, and spray pond, though the nearby older 1949 distillery remains in operation as well. The sugar factory at Monymusk provided molasses for the distillery until it shut down around 2018.

Currently, National Rums of Jamaica only owns 73% of Clarendon, with the remaining 27% owned by Diageo.

=== Long Pond ===
The Long Pond Estate was a sugar plantation and rum distillery located in Trelawny Parish, nearby Hampden Estate. Like Hampden Estate, Long Pond Estate also began operations in 1753 and was also a source of John Crow Batty, a harsh and strongly-flavored blend that became popular with locals, made from the discarded distillation cuts that were stolen by distillery workers. Long Pond Estate was originally owned by Sir Simon Haughton Clarke. By 1878, or 1921, the estate was sold to Messr's Sherriff and Company Ltd., a group of Scottish distillers.

In the early to mid 1900s, other nearby estates were consolidated under Long Pond Estate, and in 1953, the estate was acquired by the Jamaican government, before being sold to Seagram the same year, who renamed it to Trelawny Estates Ltd., in order to supply the rum for their new rum brand, Captain Morgan. Around this time, the estate also absorbed Vale Royal Estate (unrelated to Vale Royal), continuing their VRW mark. In 1977, the Jamaican government again bought Trelawny Estates Ltd. and renamed it to National Sugar Company of Long Pond, before divesting from it in 1980, selling the distillery as Long Pond Distillers, Ltd. (Long Pond) to National Rums of Jamaica (NRJ). After Seagram sold its liquor brands to Diageo, the Jamaican rums used for making Captain Morgan are now made at Clarendon. In 2009, Everglade Farms Ltd., which also owns Hampden Estate, purchased National Sugar Company of Long Pond, but Long Pond Distillers, Ltd. remains owned by NRJ. After investing far more money than they had originally planned and not seeing profits, the Long Pond Sugar Factory was shut down in 2016 by the Hussey family.

Due to environmental concerns regarding the inability to dispose of the dunder left over after distillation, Long Pond was shut down in 2012. On July 26, 2017, production restarted at Long Pond, but less than a year later, on July 16, 2018, Long Pond was devastated by a fire which began in a cane field of the neighbouring abandoned Long Pond Sugar Factory, where spent sugarcane was burned, which spread to the warehouse and the fermentation plant, destroying 65,000 L (14,000 imp gal; 17,000 US gal) of rum and the fermentation tanks. The distillery was again shut down until September, before it partially reopened, creating a limited number of rums, with the fermentation plant not reopening until 2022. In 2021, Long Pond created its own house brand, Long Pond, and released their first bottling, a 15-year-old ITP mark.

=== Innswood ===
Innswood Distillery (Innswood) was a rum and gin distillery located in St. Catherine Parish, in the south of Jamaica. It was founded by Edwin Charley in 1956, and alcohol has been produced at Innswood since 1959, making brands such as Old Reid Unique Jamaica Rum and Gordon's Gin. In 1980, the distillery was sold to National Rums of Jamaica (NRJ). The distillery stopped producing rum c. 1992, and on December 31, 1996, the NRJ officially announced the end of its rum distilling operations, transitioning to producing rectified spirits for rubbing alcohol and cosmetic uses, but some buildings continue to be used as aging warehouses for Clarendon and Long Pond rums intended to be bottled under the Monymusk brand.

=== National Rums of Jamaica ===
National Rums of Jamaica was formed in 1980 as a state-run holding company for failing rum distilleries to prevent the collapse of Jamaica's sugar and rum production. It was specifically created to take control of Clarendon, Long Pond, and Innswood as subsidiaries of the SCJ. During the Great Recession, amid worsening financial conditions, SCJ divested two-thirds of its ownership of NRJ to the West Indies Rum Distillery and Demerara Distillers, with all three entities now owning equal thirds of the company.

In January 2021, Martha Miller became the CEO of NRJ, becoming the first female CEO in the history of the Jamaican rum industry.

==== The battles over Jamaican GI ====
Following the latest amendments to the Jamaican rum GI, issued by JIPO in 2024, NRJ filed a complaint with the Jamaican Fair Trading Commission, alleging anti-competitive practices, and has filed a lawsuit with the Supreme Court, arguing that the power to amend the GI Act is exclusive to the Registrar of Industrial Property, and so the changes made by Shantal English, a hearing officer at JIPO, are illegal. On September 19, 2025, the Supreme Court sided with NRJ and issued a temporary injunction against the changes made to the GI by JIPO, not allowing the SPA to process any applications under the new GI certification.

Unlike some distilleries, such as Appleton Estate and Worthy Park, the distilleries under NRJ heavily depend on exporting rum to be blended and aged outside of the country, and NRJ asserts that this GI exists to stifle the competition of J. Wray & Nephew, the biggest player in Jamaican rum.

== Production ==
=== Clarendon ===
Most of the molasses used by Clarendon is imported, with only 30% originating in Jamaica. The molasses for the column still is fermented in four 200,000 L (44,000 imp gal; 53,000 US gal) steel tanks that are cooled by a giant heat exchanger. The column still condenser is cooled by water, which is cooled by being sprayed into the air at the spray pond.

Unlike some other Jamaican distilleries, Clarendon's rums are typically low to medium ester, with the heavy mark topping out at 600 g/hLAA. It distils with both pot and column stills, allowing for a higher production volume of around 15,000,000 L (3,300,000 imp gal; 4,000,000 US gal) of absolute alcohol annually (25% from the two pot stills and 75% from the 200,000 L (44,000 imp gal; 53,000 US gal) Indian Disti-Chem column still), making it one of the most productive distilleries in the world. There are two double-retort pot stills at Clarendon: the older 24,000 L; 6,400 US gal (5,300 imp gal) Blair, and the newer 2009 30,000 L; 7,900 US gal (6,600 imp gal) Disti-Chem. There used to be two more pot stills, but the two oldest that are 80 years old were transferred to Long Pond. The two pot stills can make two marks: light and heavy, with the light mark having a short fermentation of 30-40 hours, while the heavy mark's molasses ferments for weeks in twenty-four 95,000 L (21,000 imp gal; 25,000 US gal) open air tanks, before being transferred to a metal tank to ferment even longer; around a month in total. The cuts for heads, tails, and hearts are made with a spirit safe, and the rum exits at 85-86% ABV. The rum exits the column still at 94-96% ABV. Clarendon distils only between January and October each year.

=== Long Pond ===
The molasses used for rum production is stored in a 910,000 L; 240,000 US gal (200,000 imp gal) tank, and cane vinegar and dunder are also used for the wash. For heavy rum, muck and lime salts are also added (in a process originally patented by Jamaican chemist H. H. Cousins in 1906), and fermentation happens for 2-3 weeks in open tanks with wild yeast, while for lighter rums, fermentation is only 36-48 hours long and active dry yeast is used.

Long Pond distillery has been known for its high-ester, pungent, "funky" rums, up to the legal limit of 1,600 g/hLAA. It exclusively distils using five double-retort pot stills (3 original John Dore and 2 Blair from Clarendon), four with capacities of 16,000 L (3,500 imp gal) and one with a 6,800 L; 1,800 US gal (1,500 imp gal) capacity, which limits their production volume to only 1,000,000 L (220,000 imp gal; 260,000 US gal) of alcohol annually. The distillate exits the pot stills at 86-87% ABV, and all pot stills are capable of producing both high and low ester marks. The distillery has an old twin-column Blair still, however it suffered a catastrophic failure around 2009 and lays in disrepair.

The plant manager at Long Pond is Kevin Barnett.

=== Innswood ===
Rum at Innswood was produced on continuous column stills. There used to be a pot still used to make Gordon's Gin, but it is dismantled and in disrepair. Today, the only rum operations are blending and aging, as well as a cooperage and offices to support the warehouse.

=== National Rums of Jamaica ===
NRJ has a house brand, Monymusk, which is a blend of rums from both Clarendon and Long Pond. The rums are barreled for aging at around 70% ABV. The master blender for Monymusk is Derrick Dunn.

== Products ==
=== Clarendon ===
90-95% of rum produced at Clarendon is sold to Diageo, to make Captain Morgan, and Sazerac, to make Myers's Rum, which amounts to 60% of Jamaica's bulk rum exports. The remaining portion sold to third parties, or blended to make Monymusk, NRJ's house brand of rum.

=== Long Pond ===
Long Pond's rums are almost entirely sold as bulk rum to third parties or to make the Monymusk blend for NRJ, but they recently released their first house-brand 15 year aged ITP rum.

=== National Rums of Jamaica ===
- Monymusk Plantation Special Gold Rum - 40% ABV - A blend of rums aged in charred ex-bourbon barrels.
- Monymusk Plantation Classic Gold Rum - 40% ABV - A blend of rums aged for 5 years in charred ex-bourbon barrels.
- Monymusk Special Reserve - 40% ABV - A blend of rums aged for 10 years in charred ex-bourbon barrels.
- Monymusk Plantation Whispering Breeze - 40% ABV - A coconut-flavored rum liqueur.
