= Luca Gargano =

Italian entrepreneur and rum expert

Luca "Ruruki" Gargano
- Born: 1956 (age 69–70); Genoa, Italy
- Occupation: CEO
- Employer(s): La Maison & Velier (LM&V)
- Known for: Discovering abandoned Caroni rum, popularizing Haitian clairins, founding the Triple "A" wine movement, and the Gargano rum classification system.
- Awards: Mejor experto de ron (2014), Best Rum Influencer of the Year (2016), Rum Producer of the Year (2022)

Luca Gargano (born 1956) is an Italian businessman who is the CEO of Velier, a Genoa-based importer and distributor of wines, spirits, and Caribbean rums. He has contributed to the rum industry by acquiring and bottling the last known stocks of the defunct Caroni distillery in Trinidad, introducing Haitian clairin to international markets, popularizing Hampden Estate in Jamaica, and developing the Gargano rum classification system. Gargano advocates for transparency, terroir, and traditional production methods in rum and wine, and has been a prominent critic of additives and misleading labeling practices in the rum industry. His efforts have transformed Velier from a small family company to an internationally recognized enterprise, and have earned him multiple awards and co-bottling partnerships with major distilleries.

== Early life and career ==
Luca "Ruruki" Gargano was born in Genoa, Italy, in 1956 (age 69–70). His grandfather owned a farm in the countryside, which he visited often as a young child, and described his childhood as one "before chemicals". When he was 18 years old, he started working for Spirit SpA, Italy's largest spirits importer, where his father worked as a general manager. The owner convinced him to become an ambassador for the Martinique rhum agricole brand Saint-James. He stated that his love of rum began with his first trip to Martinique later that year in 1975. At age 26, he became the marketing director at Spirit SpA, and he declined an opportunity to work as marketing director for Fininvest, owned by future Italian Prime Minister Silvio Berlusconi. Instead, Gargano decided to chase his passion for rum, and a year later in 1983, at age 27, he purchased a stake in Velier, a small Genoese family-run importer of wines and spirits.

== CEO of Velier ==
Upon purchasing a stake in Velier in 1983, Gargano refocused the company toward exclusively importing exotic Caribbean rums, such as Havana Club from Cuba, making Velier the first in Italy to import rums from the New World. This decision turned Velier from a small operation generating €300,000 per year, to a successful company generating nearly €100 million in revenue. He teaches the history of rum and how to determine a rum's quality. In 1994, Velier initiated the "Movida del Rum", a rum movement in Italy, by importing Caribbean rums to the country. In 2001, Gargano founded the Triple "A" wine movement, emphasizing character and terroir over the increasing commercialization and standardization of Italian wine. In 2014, Gargano published Atlas Du Rhum, a French-language atlas of plantations, distilleries, and rum tastings. In 2016, Velier entered a joint venture with La Maison du Whisky to form La Maison & Velier (LM&V). In 2021, Velier launched Habitation Velier Mhoba, the first pure pot still cane juice rum from South Africa.

Besides rum, Velier also imports and distributes wines and Cuban cigars.

== Contributions to rum industry ==
=== Philosophy and advocacy ===
Gargano believes that the best rums are made in batches at a single distillery, aged in the climate of that distillery, or preferably, in the distillery itself, and then bottled without blending or additives, and that a rum containing additives such as sugar will never be a great rum. He has been a vocal critic of industrial rum production, which he argues prioritizes volume and cheapness over flavor and authenticity. Gargano has criticized the practice of using specific distillery or country-of-origin names on bottles when the rum has not been fully aged in that location, arguing that differences in climate make aging location a meaningful quality distinction that consumers deserve to know. In an interview, Gargano said "the AOC, which comes from the culture of wine in France and Italy, is not born to protect. It's born to recognize ... a specific quality of a product. ... So, it's not Barbados rum [if it's aged outside of Barbados]. We have this understanding for other spirits, so why not for rum?" Gargano considers himself the opposite of most independent bottlers, claiming that they just email distilleries in the Caribbean from Europe, while he has spent decades traveling to Caribbean distilleries in person.

=== Bottling pure single rum ===
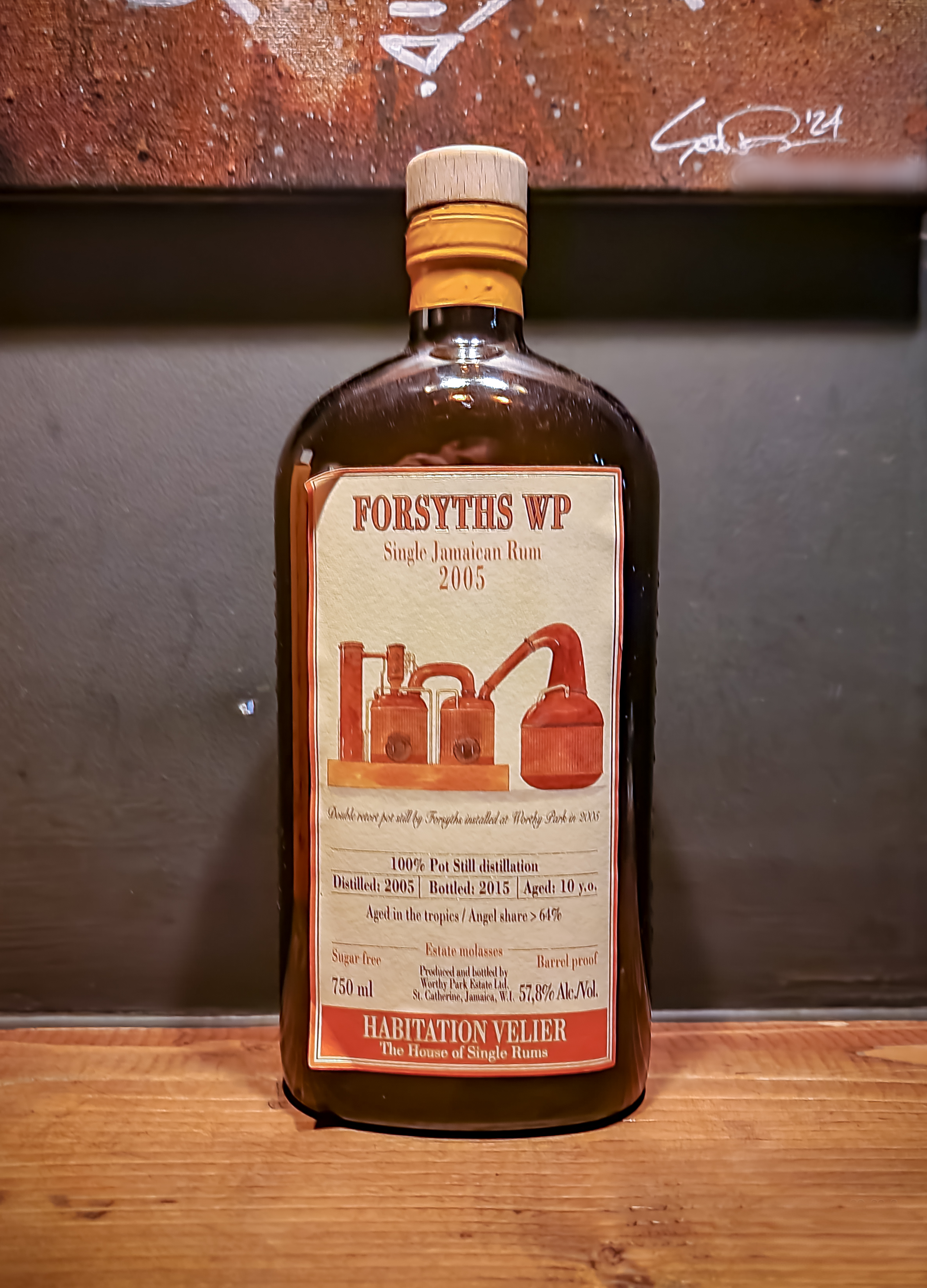
A single rum from Worthy Park in Jamaica, distributed by Habitation Velier

In 1999, Gargano visited Demerara Distillers Ltd. (DDL) for the first time, and was impressed by the 250 year old pot stills present at the distillery, finding the production very artisanal, unlike the industrial manufacturing of Spanish-style rums. After meeting with DDL chairman Yesu Persaud, Gargano befriended him and gained access to very old DDL stock. This allowed him to bottle and release a series of Demerara rums that were single estate, pot still, and fully aged in the tropics. This was the first time that Velier released such a rum, though this type of relationship would come to define the rums that Velier distributes. It also created an increase in demand for Demerara rum in Italy, a precursor to the "Caroni mania" that would come a few years later.

=== Acquisition of the last stocks of Caroni ===
Caroni distillery officially began operations in 1918 in the Caroni plain region of Trinidad and Tobago, and was a significant supplier of intensely flavored heavy rum for the Royal Navy, with sailors showing a preference for heavier, higher-ester, "funky" rums. However, it was a relatively unknown distillery, mostly selling bulk rum to blenders. Caroni distillery was closed down in 2002, representing a significant loss of rum heritage for Trinidad and Tobago and the Caribbean. In 2004, Gargano, while exploring Trinidad, found the distillery abandoned, but with a large stock of barrels still filled with rum dating back to the 1980s, aging in the hot tropical climate. Described as the "epitome" of heavy rum, Caroni rums are described as "thick, deep, oily, tropical profile with toffees, treacle and even a hint of tar". Shortly before the distillery's demolition in 2005, Gargano purchased most of the known stock of Caroni rum, and bottled it for the international market. However, unlike the common practice in Europe of transporting the rum back home, Gargano was adamant that any rum not for immediate bottling should remain in the tropics and continue aging there (due to the distillery's abandonment and perceived danger of leaving them, they were moved to DDL in Guyana). Also, instead of diluting the rum to the standard 40%, the rum was sold at cask-strength, as high as 66%. The unique terroir and high ester profile captured the attention of rum enthusiasts, and, along with the limited supply, and each release being the unblended product of a single barrel, caused "Caroni mania", where these rums fetch some of the highest prices at auctions. This launched Velier as a major player in the European rum market, and elevated the Caroni distillery from relatively unknown to widely sought by rum enthusiasts.

=== Popularization of Haitian clairins ===
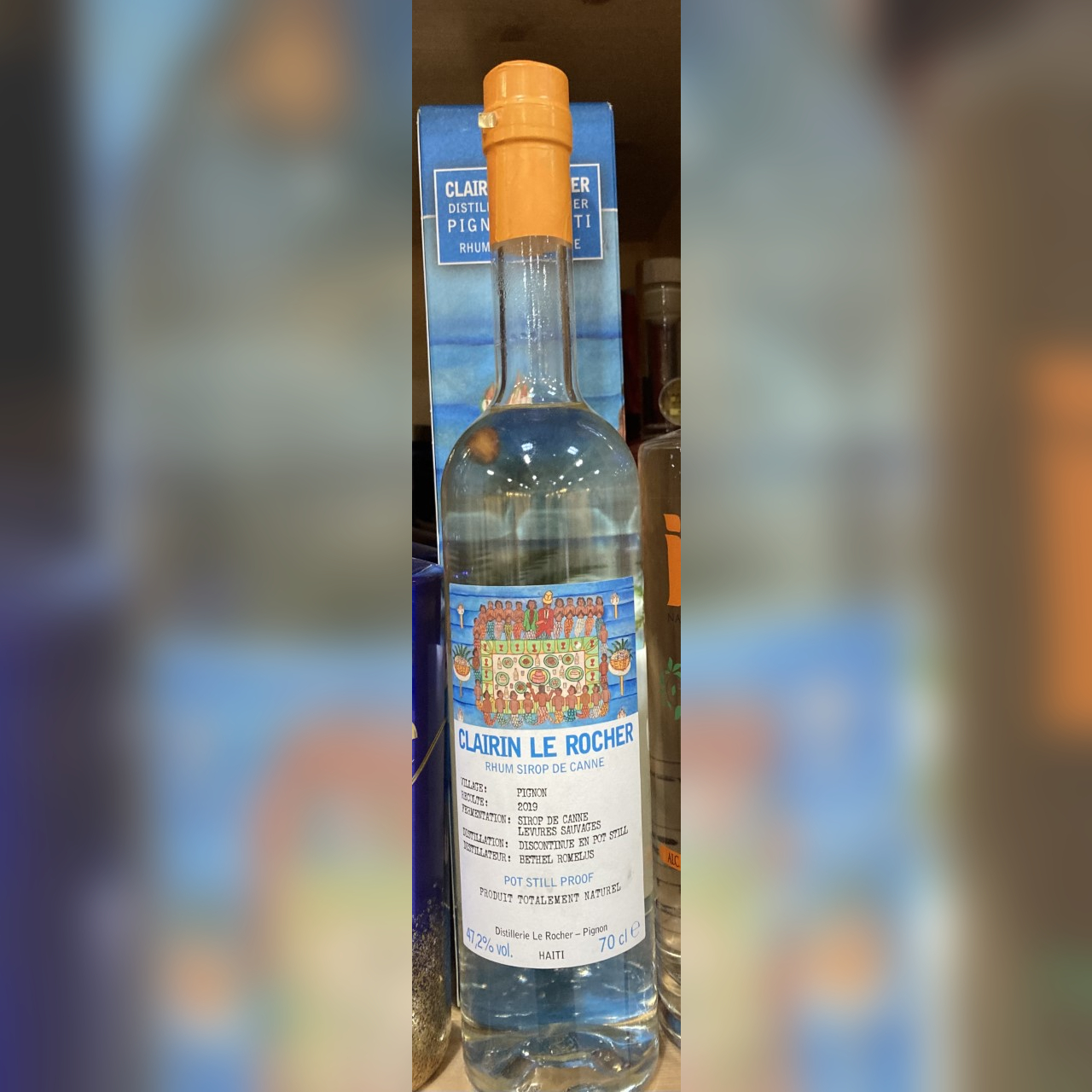
Clairin Le Rocher, one of Velier's five clairin bottlings

Since their creation centuries ago, clairins were obscure outside of the country of Haiti. When Gargano went to Haiti for the first time in 2012, he discovered both dozens of authentic small, "real" clairin distilleries, but also several continuous column industrial operations producing products named clairins, though Gargano claims that these are not clairins. Velier created a subsidiary, The Spirit of Haiti, and in 2014 released five continuous bottlings of unaged Haitian clairins: Casimir, Sajous, Vaval, and later Le Rocher and Sonson. With these international releases, Valier was credited with popularizing the spirit abroad. Since 2018, Gargano worked with Slow Food and the Clairin Presidium and the government of Haiti to establish a geographical indication (GI) for Haitian clairin, and in 2021, the Haitian government created HaïRum, which is a certification mark granted to clairins which meet certain criteria.

=== Popularization of Hampden Estate ===
Gargano is credited with introducing the world to Hampden Estate, a previously unknown bulk rum producing distillery, like Caroni. In 2017, Velier became the exclusive distributor for Hampden Estate, when the company bought exclusive global distribution rights, as well as Hampden's entire stock of rum, including their entire stock of aged rum. Gargano's investment into Hampden greatly increased the reputation of the distillery. In 2022, a Hampden single rum and a Hampden blend both won gold medals at the 2022 IWSC awards.

Gargano described his project with Hampden Estate as an end of a colonial era, where European traders used to buy marks for cheap, blend them, then sell them. In collaboration with Velier, Hampden released several single estate rums, and some rare offerings, including the 1780 Harewood House rum, where each bottle sold for several thousand pounds.

=== Co-bottling the Appleton Hearts series ===
In 2020, Velier entered into a collaboration with Campari, the company that owns J. Wray and Nephew Ltd. to release a pure single rum from Appleton Estate. Following the success of this collaboration, the following year in 2021, Gargano and Joy Spence released a series of the Appleton Hearts Collection, a series of pure single rums.

=== Gargano rum classification ===
Unsatisfied with the typical categorization of rums by color, Gargano proposed a new method, which has become an international standard by which some of the world's largest online retailers and auctioneers of rum categorize rum. His classification method divides rums based on 4 criteria:

- Ingredients: The base fermentable of the rum has a significant effect on the taste. Sugarcane rum has a significantly different taste from molasses rum, which is by far the most common type of rum. Whether the cane juice is organic, hybridized, and whether it is fresh or cooked down to a syrup also has an effect.
- Fermentation: The final product is affected by the fermentation depending on the yeast used for producing the wine, how much water is added, and also whether additional substances, such as dunder, bagasse, or vinegar are added.
- Aging: The factors that affect aging are the type of wood, the ABV of the spirit being aged, and whether the barrel is new, or was previously used for aging other wines or spirits. Likewise, whether it was aged in a hot tropical climate, or in a cooler, moist climate, will have a large effect on the aging process.
- Distillation: Rum can be distilled in a variety of stills. It can be distilled in batch stills (such as in a pot still), in a Coffey or Creole still, or a blend of several types of stills. Gargano notes that all of these can produce rums of high quality. The only exception is rums distilled to a high proof in multi-column stills. This practice is common with Spanish-style rum which, Gargano says, are made to produce as much ethanol as possible, as cheaply as possible. According to Gargano, "... if you distill in a multi column, you lose everything".

The earliest version, first created in 2012, divided rum into four categories:

- Pure Single Rum – 100 percent batch (pot) still rum from one distillery
- Single Blended Rum – a blend of only pot still and traditional column still rums from one distillery
- Rum – Rum from a traditional column still
- Industrial Rum – Rum from a multicolumn still

== Awards ==
In 2014, Gargano was elected "Mejor experto de ron" (Spanish for Best rum expert) by rum producers. That same year his book, Atlas du Rhum with Flammarion, won the 2014 Spirit Book Prize. Gargano won the Best Rum Influencer of the Year prize in the 2016 Golden Rum Barrel Awards for being the "father of Demerara rum", the discovery of the "legendary" Caroni, and for his work popularizing Haitian clairins. In 2022, LM&V won the IWSC title of Rum Producer of the Year, besides three gold, two silver, and one bronze medal, awarded to the company for various products.
