= Hampden Estate =

Jamaican rum distillery and sugar plantation

- Location: Wakefield, Jamaica
- Coordinates: 18.4401°N 77.7457°W
- Owner: Andrew Hussey
- Founded: 1743
- Founder: Archibald Stirling
- No. of stills: 6 pot stills (1 John Dore, 3 Forsyths, 1 Vendome, 1 T&T Engineering)

Hampden Estate (Hampden) is a historic rum distillery located in Trelawny Parish, on the border of St. James Parish. Formalised in 1743, sugar operations started in 1753, and their historic process for producing high-ester rum has not been modernised. The estate has been family-owned by several families since its beginning, with the Hussey family currently owning it since 2009. Though the majority of its sales are unaged bulk rum to third parties, Hampden has popularised itself in Jamaica for its "John Crow Batty" Rum Fire, and abroad for their aged rums in partnership with La Maison & Velier.

== History ==
Hampden Estate was founded in 1743 by Archibald Stirling (father of Australian politician Edward Stirling), a Scot fleeing the Jacobite Wars, in the Queen of Spain valley of Trelawny Parish. Since 1753 it operated as a sugar plantation, and the Great House at the estate was constructed in 1779. For most of its history, Hampden produced unaged bulk rum to sell to rum brokers, blenders, and to other Jamaican distilleries, and did not have its own brand. Following the abolition of slavery in Britain in 1833, Archibald Stirling, son of the elder Archibald Stirling, was awarded £12,517 in compensation for the emancipation of his 690 slaves, which included the ones at Hampden. In 1852, the younger Archibald Stirling's son, William Stirling-Maxwell, sold Hampden to George McFarquhar Lawson.

George McFarquhar Lawson is credited with creating methods for producing rums with high concentrations of esters. Following George McFarquhar Lawson's death in 1875, his grandson, Dermot Owen Kelly-Lawson, Justice of the Peace in Trelawny, took over as the owner and master distiller at Hampden (the DOK mark is named after him). William H. Farquharson married Dermot Owen Kelly-Lawson's daughter, Ena Kelly-Lawson. With George McFarquhar Kelly-Lawson, Dermot Owen Kelly-Lawson's only son, being killed in action during World War I, the estate ownership transferred to Farquharson family following the death of Dermot Owen Kelly-Lawson. Until the early 1900s, the ground floor of the estate served as a rum storage area. During World War I, Hampden built the estate's own dedicated port for shipping sugar and rum, Hampden Wharf. Today, Hampden Wharf is used as a dock for cruise ships. In 1955, as a donation to Princess Alice, the old boiler house at Hampden was disassembled and rebuilt at the University of the West Indies at Mona, serving as a chapel. The estate remained under the ownership of the Farquharson family for seven generations, until the 21st century.

Around 1994, due to financial difficulties, David Farquharson, the last Farquharson to own Hampden, took out several loans from the National Commercial Bank (NCB), including executing debentures in 1996 and 1997. In December 1999, the financial hardship became insurmountable, and the estate went into receivership, and the sugar factory shut down in December 2002, though the distillery continued to operate. The Trelawny Sugar Company, a subsidiary of the state-run Sugar Company of Jamaica (SCJ) took it over in 2002 in order to save the hundreds of jobs at the estate. However, due to mismanagement of the estate by SCJ, and a long legal battle by the Farquharson family, in 2009 it was sold to Lawrence F. C. Hussey, owner of horse racing company Everglades Farms Ltd.

Lawrence Hussey's dream was to own a sugar factory in Jamaica, and he purchased the Long Pond sugar factory from SCJ in 2009, and the nearby Hampden Estate was packaged with it as part of the deal. However, the Hussey family does not own Long Pond distillery, which is owned by a competitor, National Rums of Jamaica. Upon taking control of Hampden, Lawrence Hussey decided to start aging the distillery's rum, setting Hampden apart from most of the island's other distilleries. This caught the attention of Luca Gargano, head of La Maison & Velier, who purchased the distillery's entire aged stock of over 2,500 barrels and the global distribution rights. They also immediately began bottling Rum Fire, an unaged 63% ABV "John Crow Batty" rum in 2010, and it continues to be by far the estate's best selling offering. In 2018, Hampden released its first two branded bottlings in its entire history in conjunction with Velier: an 8 year old expression and an overproof expression. The Hussey family has continually reinvested into the distillery, including buying several new stills, the latest purchase in 2020, which brings the total annual distilling capacity to 1,400,000LAA, equivalent to the capacity of Appleton Estate.

=== The battles over Jamaican GI ===
Several Jamaican distilleries, such as Hampden, side with the Spirits Pool Association (SPA) in their fight to defend the Jamaican rum geographic indication (GI).

=== John Crow Batty ===
"John Crow Batty" (also known as "rude rum" or "kullu kullu") is a Jamaican term referring to extremely strong, unrefined rum, historically associated with workers at Hampden and Long Pond stealing the heads and tails left over from rum production, creating a low-grade, intense rum full of esters and congeners, particularly undesirable ones such as fusel alcohols. Modern commercial Jamaican white overproof rums are typically produced at 63% ABV (110 UK proof), and Charley's J.B. Overproof and Hampden's Rum Fire were created to draw from their historic ties to "John Crow Batty".

The Rum Fire label has been described as unusual, with very simple graphics and wordart-like font rather than the more refined labels of Hampden's other bottlings and most other brands, with bright blue and red flame effects for the background. This was inspired by the fact that John Crow Batty was a black market product, typically stolen directly from distilleries, mainly in Trelawny. Bar owners would test its authenticity by splashing it onto the wooden counter of their bars and lighting it on fire. Rum that is full strength, directly from the still would erupt in blue and red flames.

== Production ==
Of the remaining distilleries in Jamaica, Hampden has by far changed the least in terms of looks and operations over its 250-year history. The fermentation happens in the Boiling House, where large wooden vats of wort are left exposed to the air, allowing wild yeasts, mold, and bacteria to ferment, and covering the pits in a thick layer of scum. The Boiling House is left dingy and caked in gunk, fungus, and cobwebs in order to preserve the biodiversity and unique acids that develop in the fermentation, such as butyric acid and acetic acid. Butyric acid and acetic acid in the muck smell terrible, but they combine with ethanol to form esters such as ethyl butyrate, amyl acetate, isoamyl acetate, and ethyl acetate, which smell like fruit. The molasses is sourced from Caribbean Molasses Co. Ltd., at 80-85°Bx and above 52% fermentable sugars, and it is not pasteurised. The estate has more than 80 open-air cedar wood fermentation tanks, and fermentation lasts for 8 to 15 days, much longer than with most other styles of rum production. The vats are inoculated with dunder, which is the waste sludge left behind in the still after fermentation, in a similar process to sour mash. About 10% of their dunder is added to the fermentation, with the remaining dunder returning to the sugarcane fields as fertiliser. Hampden is one of only two distilleries in Jamaica still using traditional muck pits, and also has "muck graves" outside, which store muck long-term to maintain the bacteria for years. The muck is further fortified with waste sugarcane, sugarcane vinegar (up to 5g/L of acid), rotting fruit, and other materials, left to fester in the hot Jamaican climate. The muck is added to the molasses wine after fermentation is completed, as its high acidity would harm the yeast. This creates an additional bacterial fermentation which further increases the concentration of complex acids. There are rumors that dead animal carcasses are included in the muck, which Hampden denies. Journalists have referred to the odor as "thick", "putrid", and "impossible to put into words", but also, "the most unmistakably vivid example of terroir influencing a spirit’s character".

Despite the conditions in the vats, the distillation removes anything harmful from the final rum. The entirety of Hamden's production is pot-distilled, which preserve the "funk" or "hogo" (from French "haut goût", meaning "high taste"), which are the fruity characteristics that are a staple of Jamaican rum. Hampden has six copper double-retort pot stills in total: the oldest, a 2,000-gallon John Dore from 1960, three 5000-gallon Forsyths from Scotland (one from 2010, and two from 2020), a 1994 5000-gallon Vendome from Kentucky, and a 2016 5,000-gallon T&T Engineering from South Africa. The distillation process takes around seven hours. The rum exits the still at around 83-86% ABV. After distillation, the low and high wines left over are collected and used for charging their respective retorts in subsequent distillations. In a process originally patented by Jamaican chemist H. H. Cousins in 1906, lime is added to the lees remaining in the high wine retort, precipitating out complex acids as salts of calcium carbonate. The salts are dried, and then later added to future high wine charges to increase the amount of complex acids during the subsequent distillations. This process is only done on the John Dore still, and it produces very high-ester marks, including DOK, which is so powerful that it's mostly used in small quantities for blending and flavoring rather than drinking straight. Hampden rums have been used in the manufacturing of Chanel perfumes and Häagen-Dazs rum raisin ice cream. The master distiller at Hampden is Vivian Wisdom. The distillery produces rum with even higher ester levels than DOK, up to 5,000 or 7,000g/hLAA, but it cannot be exported per Jamaican law.

After distillation, the rum is either bottled immediately at the on-site bottling plant, shipped to third parties as unaged bulk rum, or barreled for aging at the estate. Hampden has three aging warehouses on-site, allowing their rums to age in the hot tropical climate. Due to relatively high losses to evaporation during the tropical aging (6-7% per year), every three years, barrels of rum of the same mark and vintage are consolidated. Hampden primarily ages its rums in ex-bourbon barrels, though it experiments with other barrels, such as "Hampden Pagos", an expression aged entirely in sherry casks. No additives, sugar, or colouring are added to Hampden rums, and they are not filtered. Hampden allocates 13,000 acres to growing sugarcane, and its rums are blended with spring water from a dam near the estate.

The distillery is powered by LNG using a 200 kW (270 hp) microturbine.

== Products ==
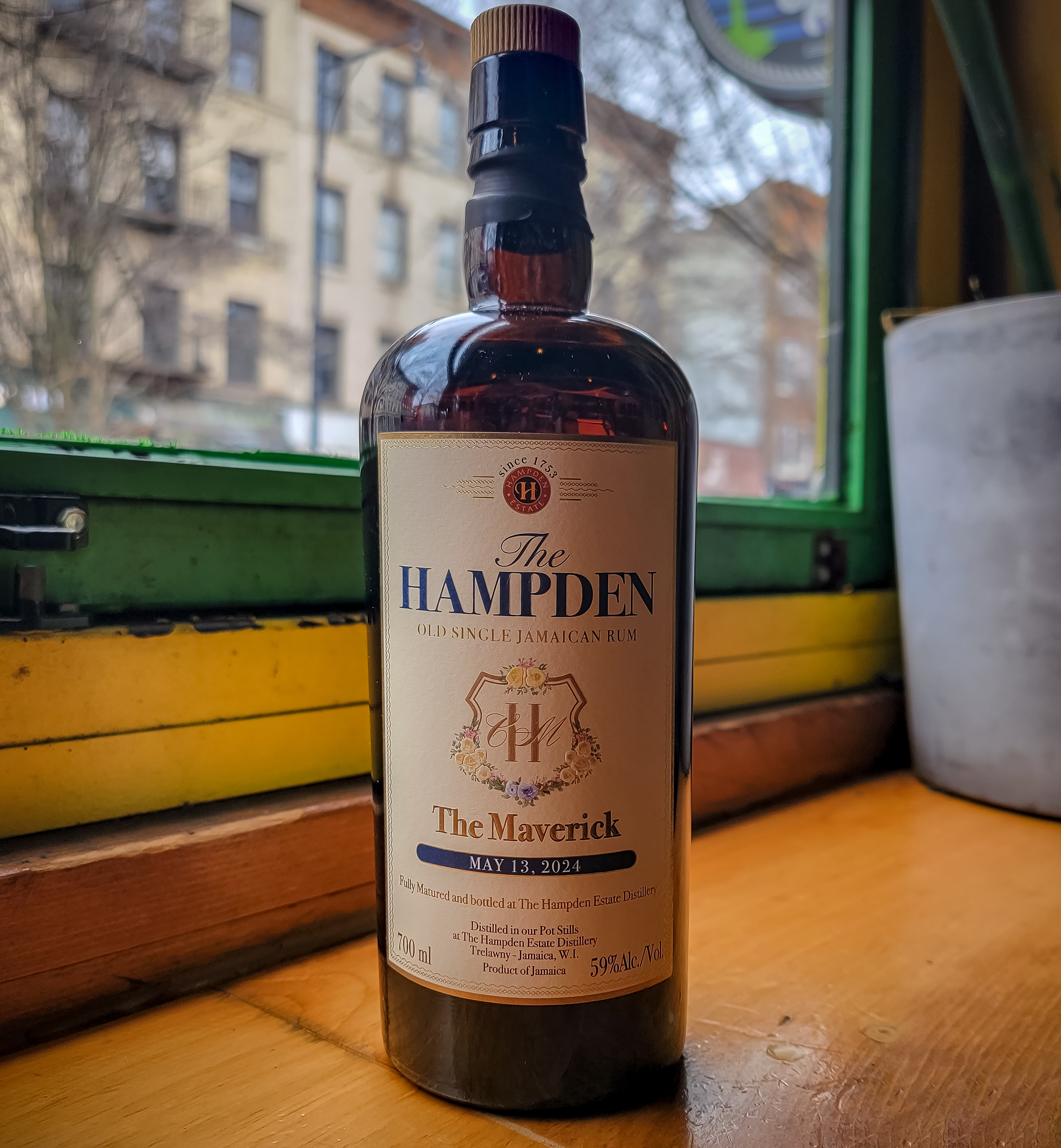
A 2024 vintage bottle of The Maverick rum by Hampden.

Hampden's core range features:

- Aged 8 Years - 46 % ABV - An 8-year aged rum using the OWH mark.
- Overproof - 60% ABV - A blend of rums aged for 7 years.
- HLCF Classic - 60% ABV - An aged rum using the HLCF mark.
- Pagos - 52% ABV - A blend of rums matured in sherry casks.
- Great House - variable ABV - A vintage blend of rums, whose marks and age changes with every annual release since 2019. Initially a distillery-only release, it is now distributed internationally.

Hampden also bottles Rum Fire, an unaged HLCF mark intended for mixing, as well as several individual single-cask releases through Velier. A different, more elegant bottle and label were used for the European market, called "Rum Fire Velvet", though the contents are identical. However, due to the bottle not being able to be made in Jamaica, it became too costly to manufacture, so Rum Fire Velvet was discontinued, and the original Rum Fire is now sold in Europe. There are also aged Hampden rums by independent bottlers, but these are from bulk unaged rum purchased from Hampden and aged elsewhere.

Besides their regular commercial bottlings, they also sell their 8 marks individually or as a set. It features the 8 marks that make up every rum produced at Hampden, whether pure or blended, in ascending order of ethyl acetate concentrations:

- OWH (Outram Wormald Hussey): 40-80g/hLAA ethyl acetate
- LFCH (Lawrence Francis Close Hussey): 80-120g/hLAA ethyl acetate
- LROK (Light Rum Owen Kelley): 200-400g/hLAA ethyl acetate
- HLCF (Hampden Light Continental Flavored): 400-600g/hLAA ethyl acetate
- ◇H: 900-1000g/hLAA ethyl acetate
- HGML (Hampden George MacFarquhar Lawson): 1000-1100g/hLAA ethyl acetate
- C◇H: 1300-1400g/hLAA ethyl acetate
- DOK (Dermot Owen Kelly-Lawson): 1500-1600g/hLAA ethyl acetate

The DOK mark is at the legal maximum ester count allowed by Jamaican law of 1600g/hL AA.
