= Rum raisin =

Ice cream flavor

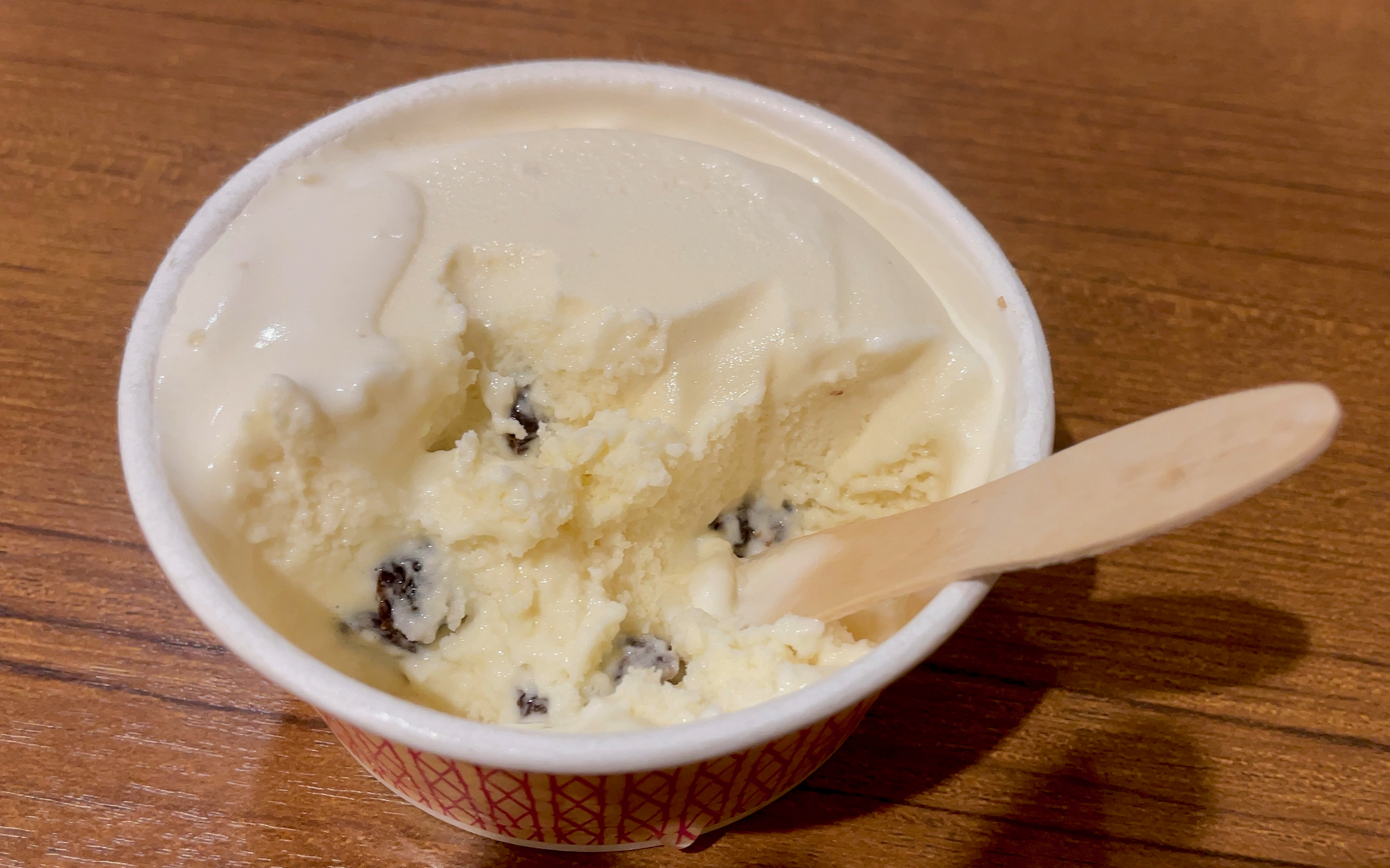
- Rum raisin ice cream in Japan
- Type: Ice cream
- Course: Dessert
- Place of origin: Italy
- Region or state: Sicily
- Invented: 1930s

Rum raisin (alternatively rum and raisin) is an ice cream flavor prepared with a combination of rum, raisins and vanilla ice cream.

== History ==
The idea of rum raisin ice cream dates back to the 1930s and originated in Sicily, Italy, where it was made by soaking raisins in rum and combining them with vanilla gelato. It was initially known as "Málaga gelato", referring to the use of raisins in producing Malaga wine. It is unclear when the flavor was introduced to the United States, but a 1932 advertisement in the Oklahoma newspaper The Ardmoreite read, "Extra Special. Rum Raisin Ice Cream. Entirely New." Rum raisin ice cream regained popularity in the 1970s and 1980s. In the early 1980s, Häagen-Dazs launched the flavor to its product line, which is credited for popularizing this ice cream in the United States. Today, rum raisin ice cream is often made with regular dark or golden raisins, but sometimes with Málaga raisins as well.

In 2021, Instacart found rum raisin to be the most popular ice cream flavor in Florida and Georgia.

== See also ==
- Pasas de Málaga
