= Blackwell Rum =

Jamaican rum brand

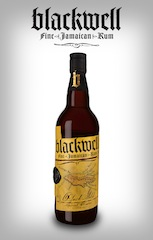
- Type: Rum
- Manufacturer: J. Wray and Nephew Ltd.
- Country of origin: Jamaica
- Introduced: 2008
- Alcohol by volume: 40% (UK); 40% (US & Export)
- Colour: Dark
- Website: http://www.blackwellrum.com/

Blackwell Rum (marketed as Blackwell Black Gold Rum) is a Jamaican brand of rum, manufactured by J. Wray & Nephew Ltd.

== History of the company ==
The company was established by the Island Records founder Chris Blackwell and the advertising executive and entrepreneur Richard Kirshenbaum in 2008. Blackwell's son, Chris Blackwell Jr., is also closely involved in the enterprise. The rum is distilled and blended by J.Wray and Nephew and distributed throughout the Caribbean and in other markets, including North America and the United Kingdom.

== Recipe and distillation process ==
The blend developed by Blackwell and the master blender Joy Spence is based on a traditional recipe from the days when Blackwell's mother's family, the Lindo's, owned J. Wray and Nephew and Appleton Estate.

Blackwell Rum is produced from Jamaican sugar cane, water and yeast to produce a blend between a traditional ‘heavy’ pot and a lighter column still rum. Once distilled, it is aged in American oak barrels for enhanced richness.

== Awards and recognition ==
- Finalist, with 92/100 – Ultimate Spirits Challenge 2012
- Gold Medal, with 94/100 – Beverage Testing Institute 2012
- International Spirits Challenge 2012 - Silver Medal for Design; Bronze Medal for Tasting
- Gold Medal – Global Rum Masters 2015
- Gold Medal Gold/Dark Rum – Festival Rum Bahamas

== In popular culture ==
Blackwell Rum appeared in the 2012 American comedy series Anger Management. It was also featured in the 2021 James Bond film No Time to Die and the reality competition show 007: Road to a Million.
