= RVG =

RVG may refer to:

- RVG (band), an Australian band formed in 2018
- Reina Valera Gomez, a Spanish Bible translation based on the Textus Receptus
- Rowena V. Guanzon, Filipina lawyer and politician
- Radiovisiography
- Rudy Van Gelder (1924–2016), American audio engineer
- RVG, a cocktail involving Wray and Nephew's White Rum
