= West Indies Sugar & Trading Company =

The West Indies Sugar & Trading Company Ltd (Wistco) is a partnership between the government of Barbados and the private sector in order to help support the Barbados sugar industry, primarily through the production, marketing and export of a premium sugar brand, Plantation Reserve.

The company is also involved in trading and retailing of premium sugar and sugar-related products both in the English speaking Caribbean and Europe. Wistco is Barbados-based and controlled, and shareholders include the Barbados Agricultural Management Company Ltd — the sole sugar producer on the island — and Goddard Enterprises Ltd — a long established Barbados company with operations across the Caribbean and Latin America.

The company operates primarily from Barbados and across the Eastern Caribbean with subsidiary offices in the United Kingdom. Wistco pays almost twice the EU subsidised price for Plantation Reserve, allowing the industry to make a reasonable margin and providing funds for ongoing development programmes. It also supports the sugar heritage of Barbados in partnership with the Barbados National Trust.
