= Myers's Rum =

Brand of Jamaican rum

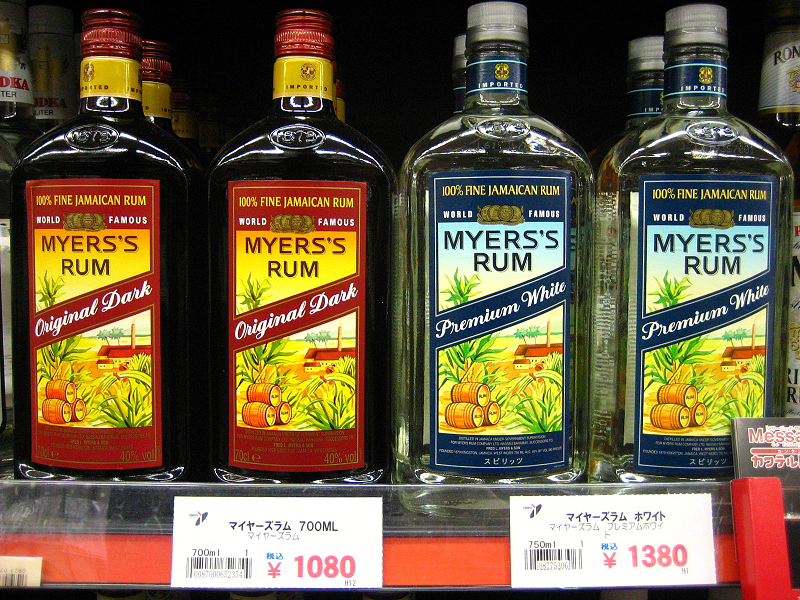
- Varieties of Myers's Rum at a liquor store
- Type: Distilled beverage
- Origin: Jamaica, Caribbean
- Introduced: 1879
- Alcohol by volume: 40%
- Color: Dark brown or clear
- Related products: rum

Myers's Rum is a brand of Jamaican black rum produced by Sazerac. Named after the brand founder, Frederick Louis Myers, the molasses-based blend of pot- and column-still rums has been produced since 1879.

Myers's is commonly used in mixed drinks, notably planter's punch, and is also used as a cooking ingredient in sweet and savory dishes.

== History ==
Myers's Original Dark rum was created by Frederick Louis Myers in 1879. On July 27, 1954, Eustace Myers, grandson of Frederick Louis Myers, sold Myers's Rum to Distillers Corporation Seagrams, Ltd. In 2000, Seagram sold the rum to Diageo. In November 2018, Diageo sold Myers's Rum and various other brands to the Sazerac Company for $550 million. The deal was announced in 2018, with the view that it would be completed in early 2019. It was instead completed before the end of the year and encompassed the sale of 19 brands, including Myers’s Rum.

In 2026, Myers's Rum partnered with Macanudo to release M by Macanudo Myers's Rum, a flavored cigar inspired by the shared Jamaican heritage of the two brands.

== Production ==
Myers's Rum is primarily produced at Clarendon Distillery in Jamaica. Myers's rum is based on fermented Jamaican molasses, and is produced from continuous and pot still distillation, and is then matured for up to four years in white oak barrels. Despite the aging, the deep dark color primarily comes from caramel color and/or molasses added after distillation.
