= Clairin =

Distilled spirit made from cane sugar produced in Haiti

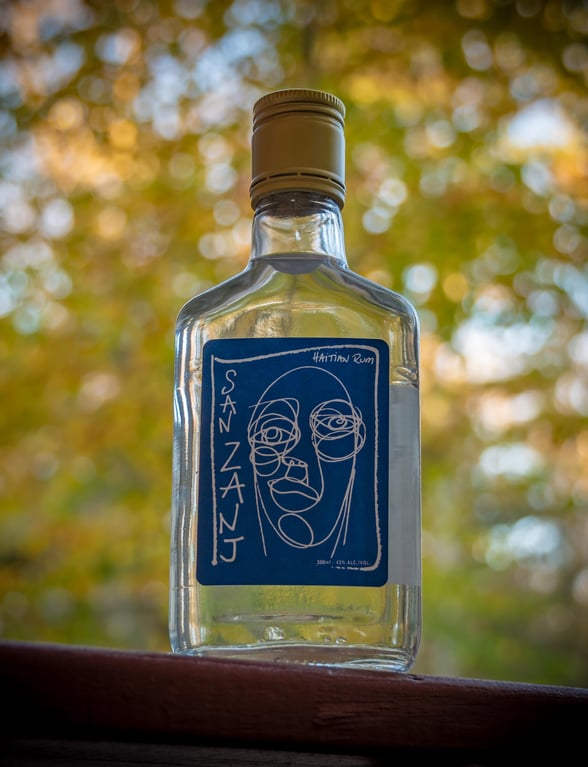
- A bottle of San Zanj, a brand of Haitian clairin
- Type: Distilled beverage
- Origin: Haiti, Caribbean
- Introduced: 18th century
- Color: Clear
- Related products: rum, rhum agricole

Clairin (/kleɪˈrɛn/, French pronunciation: [klɛʁɛ̃], Haitian Creole: Kleren) is a distilled alcoholic spirit made from sugarcane produced in Haiti, that undergoes the same distillation process as rhum, although not as refined. They have become popular outside of Haiti largely due to the efforts of Luca Gargano. The name clairin is translated from kleren, the Haitian Creole word for 'clear'.

There are between 500 and 600 micro-distilleries in Haiti, compared to fewer than 50 in total throughout the rest of the Caribbean. The distilleries known as guildives are artisan productions: most of them are small shacks dotted around the countryside producing for the consumption of their own villages. There is no government regulation for the creation process of clairin, however, the Haitian government created HaïRum, which is a certification mark granted to clairins which meet certain criteria.

Clairin is made from indigenous cane varieties, non-hybridized, with no chemical interference in the agriculture. They are spontaneously fermented with no yeast selected, distilled in traditional Creole stills using techniques from the mid-18th century, and are not filtered.

== History ==
While under the colonial rule of the French, enslaved people working on sugar cane plantations learned how to distill fermented cane juice into a spirit, which they called "kill-devil". Clairins have been tied to Haitian vodou, where it's frequently used in ceremonies, such as being offered to the spirits, and the two have been attributed to the success of the revolt against the French. Clairins were largely consumed entirely locally within Haiti until recently, largely due to the efforts of La Maison & Velier chief Luca Gargano, who wanted to introduce this unrefined, raw, and intensely flavored spirit to the world.

== See also ==
- Rum
- Rhum agricole
- Haitian cuisine
- Tafia
