= Plantation Reserve =

Plantation Reserve Sugar is a product of the West Indies Sugar & Trading Company of Barbados and is a coarser, lighter raw cane sugar with a distinctive natural taste. The product itself is only made using sugarcane selected and harvested when sucrose content is at its peak. This occurs during a 2-week period of the 5 month harvest season and provides exceptionally pure juice for the mills. This juice purity allows the production of naturally larger crystals through a unique process that takes almost three times longer than that used for normal sugar.

== Background ==
Plantation Reserve has been developed with the government of Barbados in order to ensure the sustainability of the Barbados sugar industry. The company pays almost twice as much as any equivalent sugar product reflecting both the unique process required to produce Plantation Reserve and a need to ensure that farmers to make a reasonable margin. This is part of an effort to support the Barbados sugar industry, under threat from a decline in the subsidised price traditionally paid for sugar by the European Union. Sugar is important to Barbados not only from a foreign exchange and aesthetic perspective, helping to keep the island attractive for tourism, but also protects the island’s thin layer of topsoil and prevents flooding. The company also supports the sugar heritage of Barbados in conjunction with the Barbados National Trust and is based at the Morgan Lewis sugar mill, Barbados – the oldest surviving wind-powered mill in the world, which still grinds canes for Plantation Reserve.

== Markets ==
Plantation Reserve is primarily sold through the English speaking Caribbean, including Barbados, and the United Kingdom, although no UK supplier can be identified as of November 2017. As of February 2020 it is available at Home Bargains and B&M.

== Response ==
It has been used at the Ritz Hotel, London and Sandy Lane Hotel in Barbados as well as in The Cliff restaurant and at the Royal enclosure at Ascot races. Chefs use the natural flavour of Plantation Reserve in small quantities to enhance dishes such as crème brûlée and to add flavour to dressings, sauces and desserts. According to Sandy Lane’s executive pastry chef, Cameron Steele, "If you smelled and tasted Plantation Reserve blind against other golden sugars, you would definitely spot the difference. It has a buttery caramel taste and a more intense, deep flavour and aroma than any other sugar. It is very, very different."

Other than cooking, it is used on porridge and to enhance the taste of teas and coffees.

== See also ==
- Sugar
- Barbadian companies
