= Barbados National Trust =

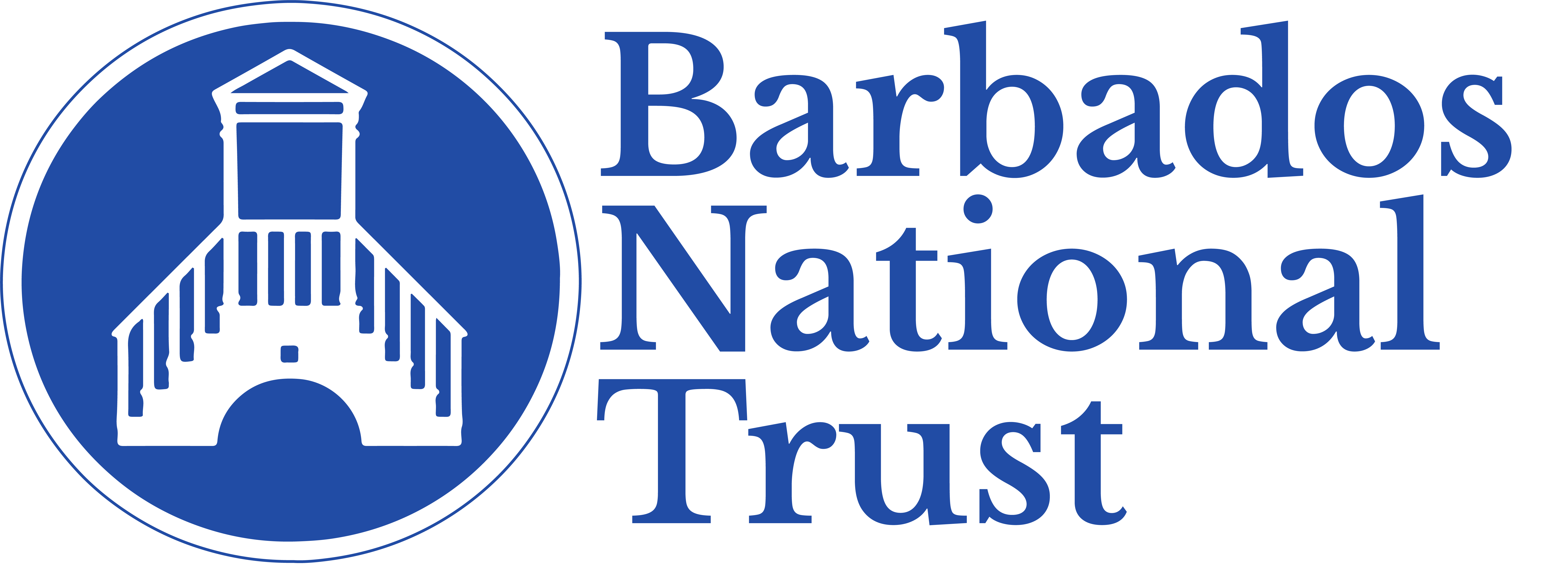
Barbados National Trust Logo

The Barbados National Trust, founded in 1960, is an organisation which works to preserve and protect the natural and artistic heritage of Barbados and to increase public awareness of the country's historic and architectural treasures. These include a number of different cemeteries, gardens, historic houses, nature reserves, park areas, windmills and coastal areas.

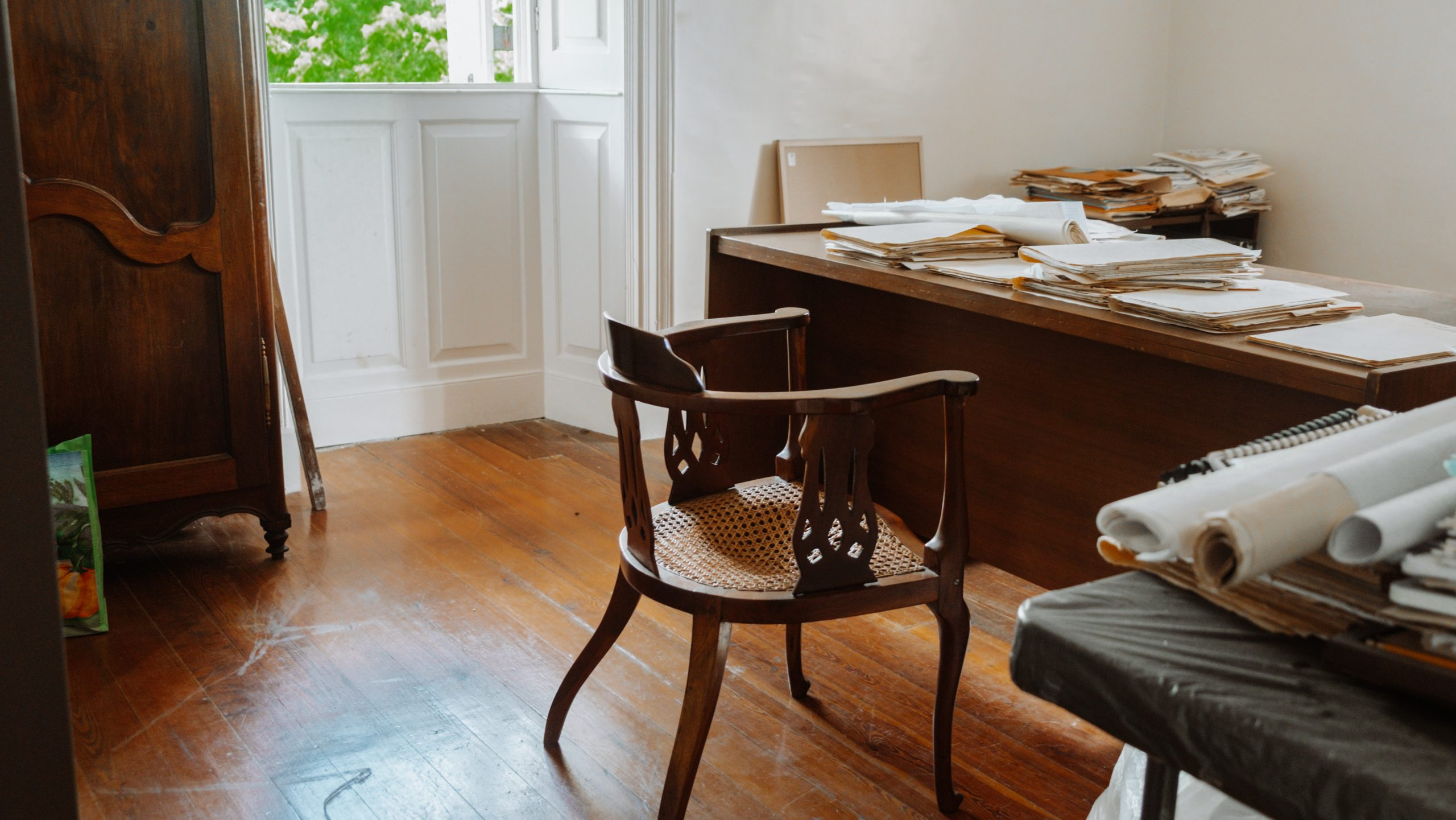
Interior of Wildey House

The Trust also runs museums displaying a collection of artefacts owned and made by Barbadians, as well as an education programme, focusing on the island's history and what it means to the future.

The Barbados National Trust has built a good working relationship with other National Trusts worldwide, equally with the organisations and their members, in places such as Canada, Scotland, England, Ireland, Wales, and the United States.

== Published works ==
- Carrington, Sean; Henry Fraser; John Gilmore; Addinton Forde (2007). A~Z of Barbados Heritage. Macmillan Caribbean Publishers Limited. ISBN 978-0-333-92068-8.
- Fraser, Henry S. (9 November 1990). Treasures of Barbados. MacMillan Press. ISBN 978-0-333-53369-7.

== See also ==
- Plantation Reserve
- List of plantations in Barbados
