= Pasas de Málaga =

Protected designation of origin from Málaga, Spain

Pasas de Málaga (lit. "raisins from Málaga") is a protected designation of origin (PDO) for raisins produced in the province of Málaga, Spain, that meet the requirements established by its regulatory council.

== History ==
Muscat grapes were brought to Spain by the Muslims between the 7th and 15th centuries. Raisins have been produced in the Axarquía region of Málaga for at least the last three centuries.

Raisin production in the province of Málaga peaked in the 19th century. Every year, 5,700 tons were exported to other European countries and 7,300 tons to the United States. It is worthy of note there were trading companies that were the exclusive suppliers of raisins to the Spanish Royal Household. Starting in 1875, various factors led to a decline in the sector: the fall in prices due to the increase in production, the arrival of powdery mildew disease, a phylloxera invasion in 1878, and competition in the form of Corinth raisins from Greece. Production, which took place on small farmsteads or minifundios, did not return to its peak levels. In the 1960s, there was some increase in production, which declined again in the 1990s.

In 2017, the Food and Agriculture Organization of the United Nations (FAO) named the Málaga Moscatel Raisin Cultivation System, in the Axarquía region, as the first European crop in the category Globally Important Agricultural Heritage Systems (GIAHS), as officially declared at the FAO Conference in Rome on 19 April 2018.

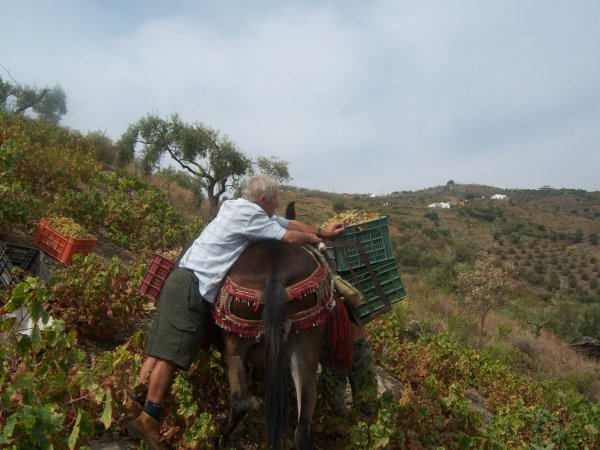
Harvesting grapes in a vineyard in Árchez.

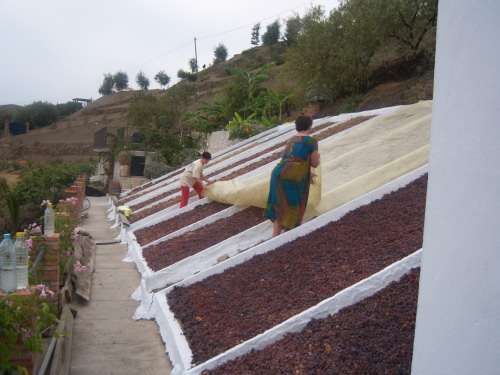
Paseros, racks where grapes are left to dry.

== Characteristics ==
Raisins are obtained by the natural dehydration of grapes of the Vitis vinifera variety, until they reach a state that allows for their preservation. The designation of origin covers raisins produced in the Axarquía region and the western coast subregion, an area comprising the municipalities of Manilva, Casares, and Estepona. Malaga raisins are made from Moscatel grapes: En cuanto a las variedades de vides plantadas en la zona de producción, en el siglo XIX, eran muy diversas. En la actualidad, la variedad que predomina es la Moscatel. Esta variedad, procedente de África, ha sido utilizada desde la invasión musulmana para vinificación, uva de mesa y pasificación. Su dispersión ha sido muy grande a lo largo del tiempo lo que explica la existencia de gran cantidad de sinónimos para esta variedad como son: Moscatel de Alejandría, Moscatel gordo, Moscatel de Chipiona, Moscatel gorrón, Moscatel de grano gordo, Moscatel de España, Moscatel de Málaga, Moscatel real, Moscatel romano, Moscatel de Valencia y Moscatelón. (Note: English: As for the varieties of vines planted in the zone of production, in the 19th century, they were very diverse. At present, the predominant variety is the Moscatel. This variety, which comes from Africa, has been used since the Muslim invasion for winemaking, dessert grapes, and raisins. Its spread has been very wide over time, which explains the existence of a large number of synonyms for this variety, the Muscat of Alexandria, which is also known as: Moscatel gordo, Moscatel de Chipiona, Moscatel gorrón, Moscatel de grano gordo, Moscatel de España, Moscatel de Málaga, Moscatel real, Moscatel romano, Moscatel de Valencia, and Moscatelón.)

The Regulating Council of Designation of Origin is the same one that regulates the Málaga and Sierras de Málaga designations of origin, after the merger approved by the Regional Government of Andalusia in 2004, when it was renamed Regulating Council of the Designations of Origin Málaga, Sierras de Málaga, and Pasas de Málaga.

The Axarquía region, which is located east of the city of Málaga, includes a total of 35 municipalities, although raisins are only produced in about 15.

== See also ==
- List of Andalusian food and drink products with protected status
- Muscat (grape)
- Muscat of Alexandria
- Malaga (wine)
- Málaga and Sierras de Málaga

== Bibliography ==
- Ministry of Agriculture, Fisheries, Water, and Rural Development (1 November 2002). Descripción del sector de la uva pasa (PDF) (Report) (in Spanish). Andalusia, Spain: Regional Government of Andalusia.
