= Malaga (wine) =

Spanish sweet fortified wine

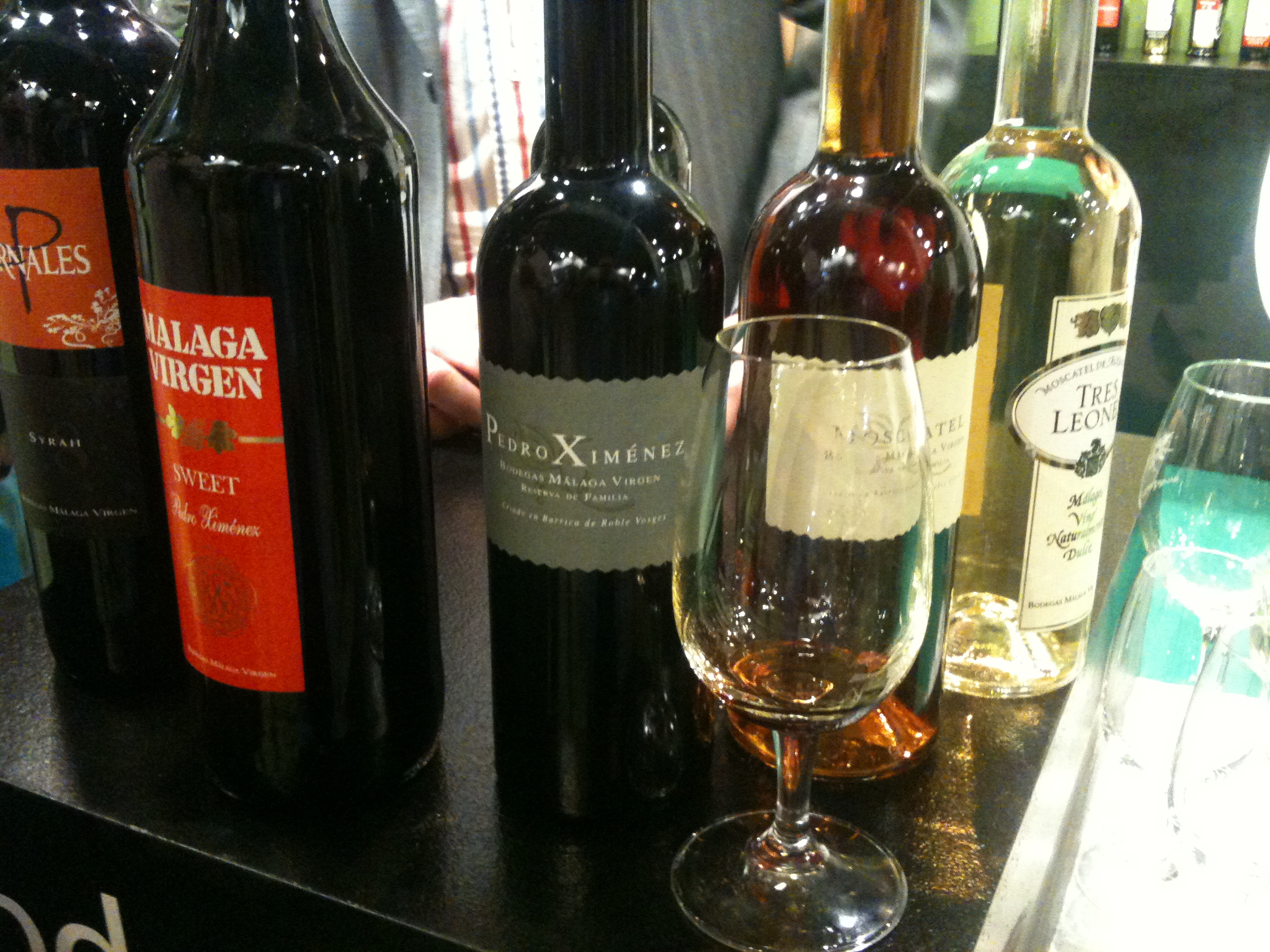
Malaga

Málaga wine is produced in the Spanish province of Málaga under two denominations of origin managed by a single Consejo Regulador: DO Málaga, which covers sweet and fortified wines made primarily from Pedro Ximénez and Moscatel grapes; and DO Sierras de Málaga, created in 2001, which covers dry still whites, rosés, and reds — particularly from the high-altitude Serranía de Ronda subzone. In recent decades, secondary wine-travel and specialist coverage has described Málaga as an evolving or relatively under recognised Spanish wine region rather than solely a historic producer of sweet fortified wines.

== Geography ==
Both DO Málaga and DO Sierras de Málagashare the same geographic territory across 67 municipalities in the province of Málaga, divided into five subzones: Axarquía, Montes de Málaga, Norte, Manilva, and Serranía de Ronda. Axarquía has been described as a principal subzone, with more than 2,200 hectares under vine.

The principal production areas include Sierra de Almijara, Antequera, Vélez Málaga, and Cómpeta, and the main wine villages of the appellation include Frigiliana and Vélez-Málaga.

== History ==
The winemaking history in Málaga and the nearby mountains is one of the oldest in Europe, with evidence of viticulture dating to Phoenician settlement in the region around the 8th century BC. Like many of the world's great dessert wines, demand for the classic sweet styles fell dramatically in the 20th century following the devastation of phylloxera — which first arrived in Spain via Málaga in 1878 — and subsequent rural decline. The creation of DO Sierras de Málaga in 2001 marked a turning point, allowing producers to bottle dry still wines under a Málaga appellation for the first time, prompting significant investment and a renewal of international interest in the region.

== Modern Developments ==
Subsequently, the region’s modern development came to be associated with small and family producers, the revival of old vineyards, experimentation with additional grape varieties, and the growth of organic and biodynamic practices, particularly around Ronda. This period has also been characterised by a stylistic contrast between traditional sweet Moscatel wines and newer high-altitude dry wines produced in Ronda, alongside the continued use and reappearance of local grape varieties including Romé.

The SO Sierra de Málaga denomination is administered by Spain's oldest wine regulatory council, the Consejo Regulador, established in 1933.

In 2025 the Ronda and Málaga Wine Route was reported to have won a “Best Wine Route to Discover” award.

== Classification ==
Malagas classically come in three distinctions (denominación de origen):

- Malaga (mostly sweet white wines)
- Sierra de Malaga (white, rose and red wines)
- Pasas de Málaga (raisins)
