= Captain Morgan =

Brand of rum-based spirit drinks

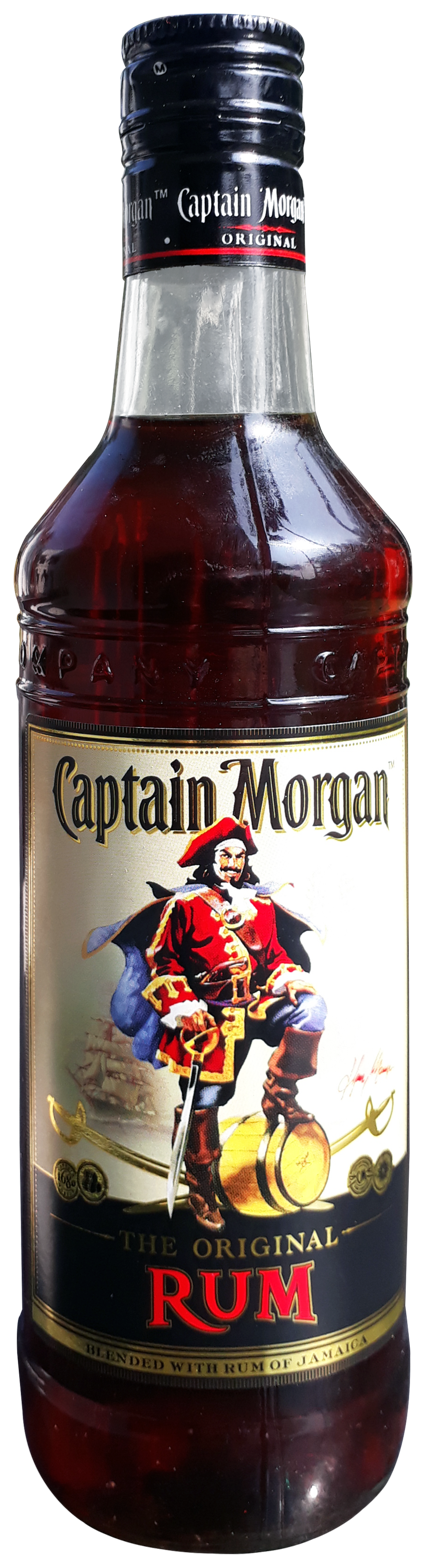
- Manufacturer: Diageo
- Origin: United States Virgin Islands
- Introduced: 1944; 82 years ago
- Alcohol by volume: Various
- Proof (US): Various
- Colour: Golden
- Variants: Original Spiced Gold; Dark Rum; 100 Proof Spiced Rum; White Rum; Black Spiced; Tiki; Spiced Gold 0.0% Alcohol Free Spirit; Coconut; Private Stock; Cola; Silver Spiced; Tattoo (Discontinued); Long Island Iced Tea; Lime Bite; 1671; Gingerbread (Christmas 2020)
- Related products: List of rum producers
- Website: captainmorgan.com

Captain Morgan is a brand of rum-based spirit drinks and other flavoured rums produced by British alcohol conglomerate Diageo. It is named after the 17th-century Welsh privateer of the Caribbean, Sir Henry Morgan.

Captain Morgan everywhere outside of Jamaica is produced by Diageo, however within Jamaica, Captain Morgan is a completely unrelated rum produced by J. Wray & Nephew Ltd., due to Diageo not owning the trademark in Jamaica.

== History ==
In 1944 the Seagram Company started manufacturing the Captain Morgan brand of rum. In 1984, Captain Morgan Original Spiced Rum was introduced to the United States. In 2001 the Captain Morgan brand was sold to Diageo, a multinational drinks company based in London. On 15 April 2005, Captain Morgan Tattoo Black Spiced rum and its claimed 'sweet-to-heat' finish became another addition to the Captain Morgan line. Most Captain Morgan rum is sold in the United States, Canada, Great Britain, South Africa, and Global Travel.

In November 2009, the NFL banned a covert ad campaign allegedly put on by Diageo. It was understood that for each NFL player striking the "Captain Morgan" pose on camera during a regular season game, Diageo would donate US$10,000 (equivalent to $15,007 in 2025) to the Gridiron Greats (a non-profit which helps retired NFL players with various hardships after leaving the game). The league made this announcement following such a celebration by Brent Celek of the Philadelphia Eagles.

In 2010, two US territories, Puerto Rico and the United States Virgin Islands argued over plans for Captain Morgan to move operations to the Virgin Islands for tax reasons. The matter came to a head during a debate in the United States Congress over the USVI's attempt to use tax benefits to lure the company to that territory.

In 2014, Diageo Canada filed a trade dress infringement lawsuit against Heaven Hill Distilleries Inc, claiming striking similarities between the Captain Morgan character and Admiral Nelson, and that the similarity would dilute the Captain Morgan trademark. Diageo Canada won the lawsuit in 2017.

In 2020, the brand launched a new product called Captain Morgan Tiki, which is a pineapple mango flavoured rum-based spirit drink. It is available in the United Kingdom, Australia, Czechia, and Germany.

== Varieties ==
- Original Spiced Gold – The flagship Captain Morgan rum-based spirit drink, flavoured with spices. Reformulated in 2023 to include Madagascar vanilla. Bottled at 35% alcohol by volume (70 proof). As with many of Captain Morgan's products, it is classified as a rum-based spirit drink in the UK and EU due to its lower ABV and inclusion of other ingredients and/or spirits, but is still otherwise sold as Original Spiced Rum internationally.
- Dark Rum – Dark rum, bottled at 40% alcohol by volume (80 proof)
- 100 Proof Spiced Rum – Rum, bottled at 50% alcohol by volume (100 proof).
- White Rum – White rum that is filtered to remove the colour, except for the Atlantic Canadian market, where it retains a greenish tinge. Bottled at 37.5% alcohol by volume (75 proof).
- Black Spiced – A dark spiced rum-based spirit drink. Bottled at 40% alcohol by volume (80 proof).
- Tiki – A limited edition rum-based spirit drink, with pineapple and mango flavours. Bottled at 25% alcohol by volume (50 proof).
- Spiced Gold 0.0% Alcohol Free Spirit - Non-alcoholic alternative to Spiced Gold variety.
- Coconut Rum - A rum-based spirit drink with coconut and tropical fruit flavouring. Bottled at 35% alcohol by volume (70 proof).

== In popular culture ==
Before and after the 2015 SummerSlam event, John Cena used the brand as a nickname for Seth Rollins during WWE's Monday Night Raw.

In 2016, Diageo created special limited edition bottles to commemorate Wes Morgan captaining Leicester City F.C. to the 2015–16 Premier League title.

A technique for dislocated hip reduction is named after the pose on the bottle label which a surgeon can mimic.

== See also ==
- Captain Morgan Trophy – Rugby league trophy
- List of Puerto Rican rums
- RumChata – American cream liqueur
