= Demerara Distillers =

Guyanese distillery

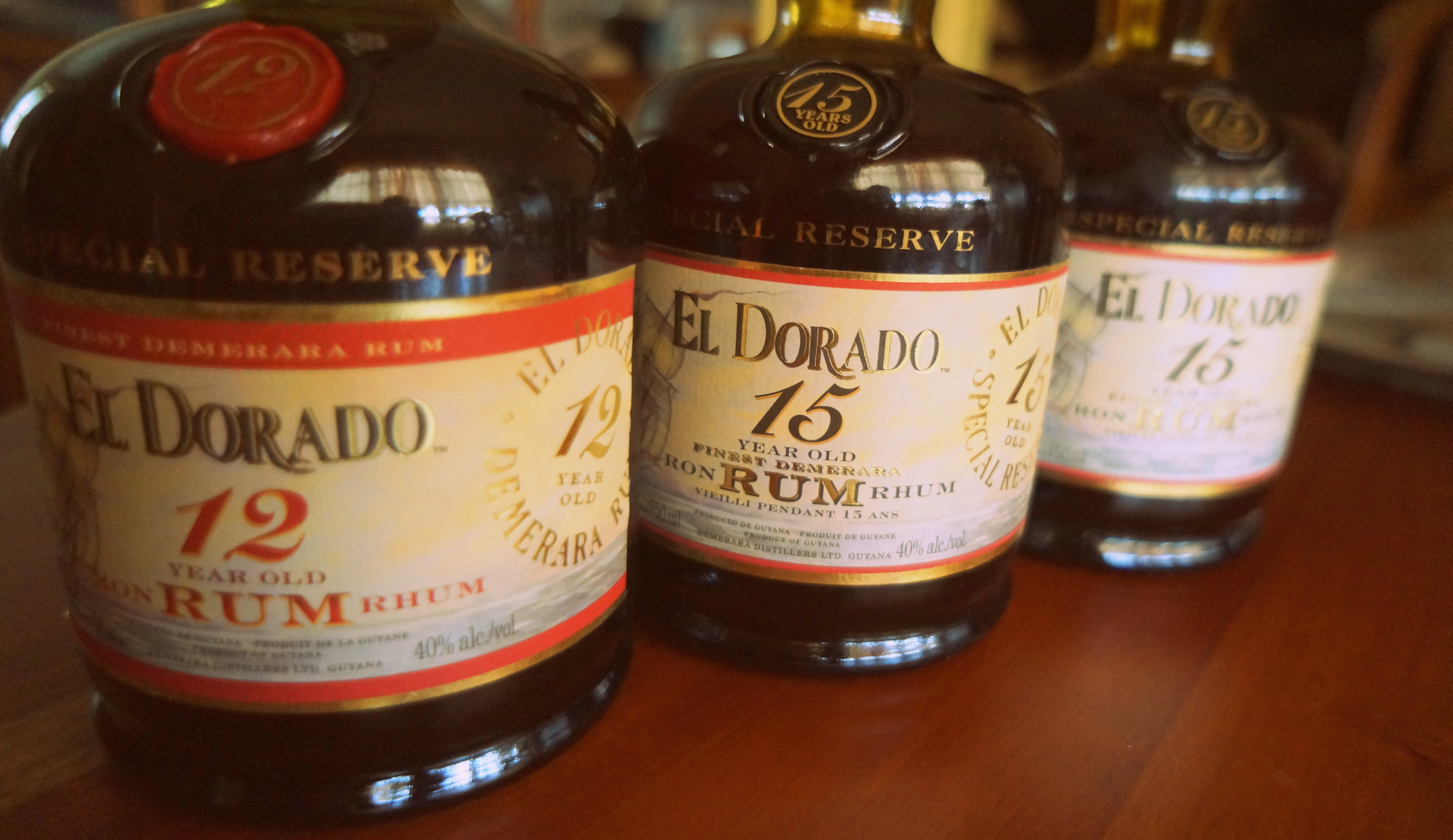

Demerara Distillers Ltd. (DDL) is a Guyanese distillery known for the El Dorado Rum brand. It was formed in 1983 as a merger of Guyana Distilleries Limited and Diamond Liquors Limited, and is headquartered in Georgetown, Guyana. It is known for its historic stills, such as the Port Mourant, Versailles, and Enmore stills, using wooden designs that are no longer in operation anywhere else in the world. Besides rum, it is a producer and distributor of gin as well as juices, soft drinks, and Pepsi products.

== History ==
=== Beginnings and growth ===
The region was originally colonized by the Dutch, who established sugar plantations in the regions of Demerara and Essequibo in the Guianas. At the time, the region contained hundreds of sugar estates, which produced rum from the generated molasses, a byproduct of sugar production. The region was also home to greenheart trees, which were very hard and resistant to rotting even in wet conditions. Combined with the scarcity of metal, this environment made wooden vat stills a popular choice for distillation. In 1803, as part of the Napoleonic Wars, the British invaded Dutch Guiana and the Dutch ceded control over the colonies in 1814. The colonies of Berbice, Demerara, and Essequibo were merged to form British Guiana in 1831, and in 1834, the British Empire abolished slavery, with a transitional "apprenticeship" period lasting until 1838. Rum production became a major industry in British Guiana, with 1.5 million gallons produced in the year following its establishment, and 3.2 million gallons produced in the 1870s, surpassing Jamaica's production and ranking British Guiana the top rum producing colony in the empire, with a significant majority being shipped back to England. As a result of former slaves abandoning plantations and the system only being sustainable with nearly-free labor, more than 340,000 indentured servants were brought from India to British Guiana to fulfill the manual labor needs of the agricultural and rum production industries. These workers also died en masse, were treated cruelly, and uprisings and riots in sugar plantations were frequent.

=== Decline and consolidation ===
Around 1880, though perhaps earlier, column stills were introduced to British Guiana. Though their adoption was rapid in some countries for their cheaper, cleaner resulting rum, their adoption was not very fast in British Guiana, as some British officials considered the product inferior to traditional pot still rum. At the same time, new and more efficient processes for refining sugar produced a molasses with much less sugar content, which further reduced the quality of the resulting rum. Following the pattern of a general decline in price of sugar and consolidation in the whole Caribbean in the 1900s, British Guiana saw the number of distilleries in the country drop from 180 in 1849 to forty-four in 1908 to eight in 1959. The Booker Bros. & Company dominated the sugar and rum industry in the early to mid 1900s. In 1949, the company purchased United Rum Merchants, the parent company of Black Heart, Lamb's Navy Rum, Lemon Hart, and Red Heart rums. At its peak, it controlled 75% of the sugar industry in British Guiana and was so powerful that a common joke was to refer to the country as "Booker's Guiana".

=== Independence, government mismanagement, and rebound ===
In 1966, British Guiana declared independence and changed the country's name to Guyana. By this point, only five distilleries were left in the country. In 1970, the British Navy discontinued the practice of the daily rum ration, and around this time, dark rum was falling out of favor, replaced by a boom in demand for cheap, light, white rum, such as those of Bacardi or Havana Club. During a period of increasing socialism in the region, under the leadership of Prime Minister Forbes Burnham, Guyana nationalized major industries, including the production of sugar and rum. However, the economy declined in the decade following this decision, and the economy was described by Guyana's Ministry of Finance as a "one-party administrative dictatorship" as "the Government pursued policies of mismanagement" using "political interference, compounded by poor management". Sugar production, rum production, and wages all fell catastrophically. During this time, in 1975, Yesu Persaud became the executive chairman at Diamond Liquors Limited. He led the initiative to combine the three last remaining distilleries, Diamond, Uitvlugt, and Enmore, into a single state-run company, Guyana Liquor Company, and oversaw the closing of all other distilleries in the country. Soon after, the government began a process of divesting and privatizing these industries, and the new government under Prime Minister Desmond Hoyt asked the Booker group to come back to Guyana in 1990. With the closure of Uitvlugt distillery c. December 1999, Diamond became the last distillery to continue operating in the country. 1992, DDL released their house-branded rum, El Dorado, and later rebranded their entry level rums to Diamond Reserve, keeping El Dorado for their more premium offerings. On September 27, 2024, a fire destroyed DDL's power station, causing the company to have to rely on temporary power solutions.

== Organization ==
=== Historic distilleries absorbed into DDL ===
La Bonne Intention was a sugar plantation and distillery established sometime between 1759 and 1873, and the distillery was closed in 1959. Its Coffey still is presumed to be scrapped, but the Savalle stills continue to reproduce their marque, LBI.

Skeldon was a sugar plantation and distillery established sometime between 1802 and 1834, and the distillery was closed in 1960. Its Coffey still is presumed to be scrapped, but the Savalle stills continue to reproduce their marques, SWR, SM, and CG.

Blairmont was a sugar plantation and distillery established sometime between 1802 and 1834, and the distillery was closed in 1962. Its Savalle still is presumed to be scrapped, either immediately after closure, or after being transferred to Uitvlugt (the one built by Uitvlugt in 1980 may be a replacement for this still), but the Savalle stills at DDL continue to reproduce their marque, B.

Albion was a sugar plantation and distillery established sometime between 1802 and 1803, and the distillery was closed in 1968. The Port Mourant still was moved to Uitvlugt in 1968, with the AW marque retired, and the wooden Coffey still is presumed to be scrapped, but DDL continues to reproduce its marque, AN, on the Enmore wooden Coffey still, and later the Savalle stills.

Versailles was a coffee plantation that was transformed into a sugar plantation and distillery, and was established sometime between 1759 and 1776, and the distillery was closed in 1978. The Versailles still was moved to Enmore in 1978, and continues operating today at DDL producing its marques, VSG and REV, with the AWM, MEC, and MEV marques retired.

Enmore was a cotton plantation that was transformed into a sugar plantation and distillery, and was established sometime between 1759 and 1776. The distillery purchased Lusignan distillery in the late 1780s or early 1790s, which itself closed in the 1960s to 1977, and fully absorbed into Enmore. No stills from Lusignan survive, and the KFM marque was reproduced at Enmore on the Coffey stills. Enmore merged with GDL (Uitvlugt) and DLL (Diamond) to form the company DDL under state control, before the distillery was closed in 1993. The Versailles and the two Coffey stills were moved to Uitvlugt in 1994, and one of the two Coffey stills continues operating today at DDL producing its marques, EHP, ELCR, and MD, with the marques NP, MXE, VNL, and KF retired. It is also likely that the Enmore still produced the AN marque at some point.

Port Mourant was a cotton plantation that was transformed into a sugar plantation and distillery, and was established sometime between 1802 and 1813, and the distillery was closed in 1955. The Port Mourant still was moved to Albion in 1955, and continues operating today at DDL producing its marque, PM, with the AW, UPM, MPM, and GM marques retired.

Uitvlugt was a coffee plantation that was transformed into a sugar plantation and distillery, and was established sometime between 1759 and 1776, and the distillery was closed in 1999. The two French Savalle stills were moved to DDL in 2000, and continue operating today at DDL producing their marques, ICBU and UMS, as well as reproducing the marques of several defunct stills, with the ICBC, DK, ICB, SP ICBU, ULR, and MGS marques retired.

Diamond is a distillery and former sugar plantation, and was established in 1753, and the distillery continues to operate today. The two Diamond Coffey stills are original to Diamond, and continue operating today at DDL producing their marques, SVW, as well as reproducing the marques of several defunct stills, with the S, SW, W, SSN, and SV marques retired.

=== Current constitution ===
Demerara Distillers Ltd. (DDL) is a publicly owned company headquartered in Georgetown. DLL owns Demerara Fire and General Insurance Company Inc., Solutions 2000, Demerara Contractors Limited, Topco, and other subsidiary companies include Distribution Services Limited and European Breitenstein Holdings BV. They were one of the first five companies to become certified by ISO 9001 international Standard System, enabling export quality goods.

Under government management, DDL became the world's second largest producer of rum. DDL was one of the first state-owned manufacturers to be semi-privatized under the Economic Recovery Program in 1988. 12 million new shares were issued, reducing government ownership to roughly 47%, although another attempt to issue shares in 1990 was blocked by the government.

In 2006, DDL obtained one-third of the shares of National Rums of Jamaica, which is a subsidiary of Jamaica's National Sugar Company Limited.

Yesu Persaud was chairman of DDL until 2013. Through his contributions to Guyanese industry, 1983 he was awarded the Cacique Crown of Honour.

Komal Samaroo became the new CEO in 2014. In 2021, Samaroo addressed the threat that the Venezuelan border issue has on "Guyana's supply chain for agriculture and other food products to the region, and even further afield".

In 2016, Bharrat Jagdeo claimed that billions of dollars were lost tax settlement between DDL and the Guyana Revenue Authority. In 2002, a dispute arose regarding a consumption tax of about GY$5.3 billion.

As of 2020, the production manager at Diamond Distillery is Darryl Manichand, the master blender is Sharon Sue-Hang, and the master distiller is Shaun Caleb.

== Rum production ==
DDL powers their distillery using a combination of burning heavy fuel oil, as well as biogas produced by their own waste combined with locally sourced cow manure, and their water is sourced from groundwater from three 500 ft (150 m) deep wells. The biogas plant was shut down in 2019 for leaking wastewater into surrounding properties, but it was restarted a year later after fixes were made.

DDL consumes over 200 tons of molasses daily to produce rum, making it one of the largest distilleries in the Caribbean by output. This used to be fully supplied by Guyana Sugar Corporation, however, in recent years, this was no longer enough, so now some molasses is imported. The molasses is fermented in 13 fermenters, with eight closed and five open fermenters. Open fermentation increases the amount of congeners in the final product, and may have their capacity expanded later, while closed fermentation allows for the capture of waste carbon dioxide to be repurposed as dry ice or to carbonate Pepsi products, as well as their house brand SOCA soft drinks. Fermentation lasts 24-30 hours, and nearly all stills in the distillery share the same wash, which is a blend of the contents of the open and closed fermenters. The only two exceptions are the Savalle stills, which also takes some low wines from its output to be redistilled along with the wash, and the Diamond High Ester still, which has a completely separate wash which ferments for months, and includes fruits. Due to impurities in the molasses, a cake forms on the copper plates of many stills in Diamond distillery, requiring stills to be shut down every few weeks for cleaning. However, Diamond distillery has so much distilling capacity, that only a few stills are distilling at any time.

Approximately 40% of rum produced by DDL is bottled for their house brands, El Dorado and Diamond Reserve, while the remaining 60% is sold to partners or as bulk rum. Historically, it was common for rums from this region to be dyed a deep brown using muscovado cooked into a burnt caramel. This gave navy rum its archetypal dark color, and was likely done in order to hide impurities and give the appearance of maturation. DDL discontinued this practice for their El Dorado lineup c. 2005.

=== Distillation ===
==== Wooden vat stills ====
Vat stills are pot stills made out of wood, and are unique to historic British Guiana. They consist of cylindrical wooden vessels heated through steam injection, copper domes covering the heads of the vessels attached to a retort, with a spiral pipe or series of pipes attached to a column through which cold water is run, and the spirit descends through the condenser. Two stills of this type, Port Mourant and Versailles, continue to operate at DDL to this day.

The Port Mourant still was first installed in 1732, though it contains newer parts, and consists of two vats with a huge swan neck connecting them, as well as a rectifier canister carrying cold water and a condenser coil. The still produces the PM marque, a "very heavy, oily" rum that is iconic, and has been tied to the flavor profile of the daily tot of the British Navy. However unlike Jamaican pot still rum, which is high in esters such as ethyl acetate, the flavors of Port Mourant distillate come from other congeners, and its rum is actually relatively low in esters.

The Versailles still was created in the early 1800s in the Versailles distillery, and is similar to the Port Mourant still, except it lacks the secondary vat. The rum it produces has about 60% the congener count of Port Mourant.

==== Pot still ====
Diamond High Ester is a John Dore double retort pot still. It was built in the 1950s. It produces the DHE marque, with ester counts of up to 7,000g/hL AA, more than four times the legal limit of Jamaican rum for export.

==== Column stills ====
Enmore is a Coffey still, a type of column still, originating from the Enmore estate and built c. 1880, though the vat was completely rebuilt in 2006. It has two square columns built out of greenheart wood, and it is the last wooden Coffey still left in the world, and still utilizes the original copper plumbing. The first column contains copper plates, while the second contains wooden plates. It produces the EHP marque, named after Edward Henry Porter, a previous owner of Enmore estate.

Savalle #1 and #2 are two four-column column stills. They are originally from Uitvlugt distillery c. 1921, but have been moved to Diamond distillery in 2000 after the shutdown of Uitvlugt distillery in December of 1999. The stills can be configured in multiple different setups, allowing for the creation of nine of Diamond's twenty-four marques.

Tri-Canada is a modern column still installed in the 1980s, built with parts purchased from John Dore & Co Ltd. and Tri-Canada, its namesake. It makes clean, neutral alcohol for spirit drinks.

Diamond Coffey #1, #2, and #3 are two-column Coffey stills. #1 and #2 have been at Diamond distillery since the 1950s, and produce the SVW marque, while #3 is a newer vacuum still built c. 2011.

MPRS is a newer five-column vacuum column still built c. 2011. Its capacity is large enough to use the entirety of the distillery's daily wash production alone, and is used to produce very light neutral spirit.

==== Other still ====
Gin Still is a batch still, which is used to make Lord Roberts brand London dry gin.

=== Aging ===
DDL has several aging warehouses, including three at Diamond distillery and one at the defunct Uitvlugt distillery. The rums are barreled for aging at 70% ABV, and over time are occasionally consolidated as rum evaporates from the barrels. After aging, rums are chill-filtered.

DDL credits the flavours of their rums to the ex-bourbon American oak barrels used in the distilling process and Guyana's tropical climate. The aging process in Guyana is accelerated by the high humidity and temperature. Rums are blended from different vintages produced in different stills, then aged in oak barrels.

=== El Dorado Products ===
- El Dorado 3 Years - A blend of rums aged for a minimum of 3 years.
- El Dorado 5 Years - A blend of rums aged for a minimum of 5 years. The blend contains EHP.
- El Dorado 8 Years - A blend of rums aged for a minimum of 8 years. The blend contains PM and EHP.
- El Dorado 12 Years - A blend of rums aged for a minimum of 12 years. The blend contains PM and EHP.
- El Dorado 15 Years - A blend of rums aged for a minimum of 15 years. The blend contains PM, VSG, and EHP.
- El Dorado 21 Years - A blend of rums aged for a minimum of 21 years. The blend contains VSG and EHP.
- El Dorado 25 Years - A blend of rums aged for a minimum of 25 years. The blend contains PM and EHP.

== Other industries ==
Besides rum, DDL also owns:

- Distribution Services Limited, a distributor for Johnson & Johnson and PepsiCo,
- Demerara Shipping Company Limited, an agent for shipping brands such as Vertraco Shipping BV.
- Demerara Technical Services Limited, a company providing technical services to Guyana.
- Other spirits, such as Ivanoff vodka and Lord Roberts gin.
- Non-alcoholic beverages, such as Pepsi products, Dr Pepper/Seven Up products, Slice drinks, SOCA drinks, TOPCO juices, Savannah milk, and Diamond water.

== Promotion ==
Despite international familiarity, El Dorado and other rums have fallen behind other liquors, such as vodka, in successful marketing or an effective classification system.

DDL sponsors countless local events, such as chess tournaments, Guyana Fashion Week, Soca Monarch competitions, and Mashramani events. They were an official partner of the inaugural tournament of the 2013 Caribbean Premier League, sponsoring the tournament's Catch of the Match award, which went to one player in each of the 24 matches who makes a catch.

A 'rum route' was launched by the Guyana Tourism Authority (GTA) in collaboration with the Caribbean Tourism Organization. The tour includes visits to Uitvlugt Estate and Blairmont Estate and commercial ventures like rum shops, distilleries, and production, as well as the historical connection to slavery and indentured servants.

== In popular culture ==
Demerara rum was a core part of the blend that the Royal Navy used for the sailors' daily rum ration, until it was discontinued in 1970. Pusser's Rum later acquired the rights to the original blend, and after continuing the multi-island blend for some time, especially due to the closure of Caroni distillery, they have transitioned to making their rum entirely from a blend of different rums from DDL.

Demerara rum, and in particular, Lemon Hart 151, has been closely tied to tiki culture.
