= J. Wray & Nephew Ltd. =

Jamaican rum distillery

J. Wray & Nephew
- Type: Private
- Industry: Distilled beverages
- Founded: 1825; 201 years ago
- Founder: John Wray
- Headquarters: Kingston, Jamaica
- Key people: Joy Spence (master blender)
- Products: Rum
- Website: https://www.wrayandnephew.com

J. Wray & Nephew Ltd. is a distiller, blender, and bottler of rum, originating and operating in Kingston, Jamaica. The company is the largest spirit producer in Jamaica, and is best known for its Wray & Nephew and Charley's JB brands, which together hold approximately 90% of the Jamaican white overproof rum market, as well as Appleton Estate, its premium aged rum line. It also has the rights to produce Captain Morgan rum within Jamaica, and exports Coruba rum, which is often used in tiki cocktails.

Appleton Estate is the oldest continuously operating distillery in Jamaica, and J. Wray & Nephew was founded in 1825 by John Wray as "The Shakespeare Tavern". Today, J. Wray & Nephew Ltd. is a subsidiary of Campari Group, and operates distilleries at Appleton Estate in Saint Elizabeth Parish and New Yarmouth Estate in Clarendon Parish.

== History ==
=== Appleton Estate ===
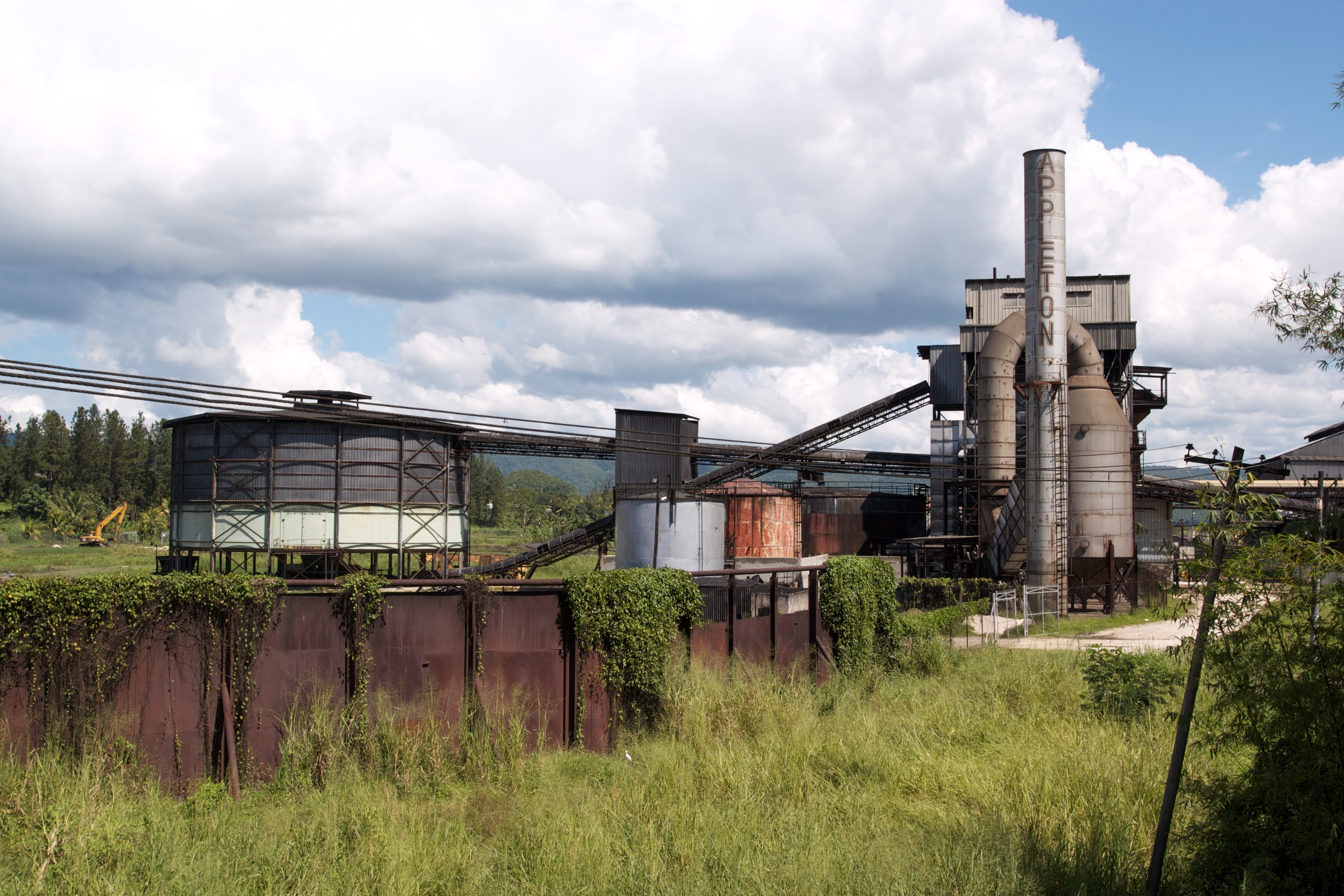
Appleton Estate distillery

Jamaica was a Spanish colony until the British Invasion of Jamaica in 1655. Following the capture and fortification of the country, the British sought to populate it and make it a sugar colony similar to Barbados, offering land grants and tax incentives for settling it. Captain Francis Dickinson participated in the conquest of Jamaica, and Appleton Estate was awarded to Dickinson for his role. Appleton Estate recognises 1670 as its founding year.

The earliest record of rum produced at Appleton was in 1749. In 1871, William Hill purchased Appleton from the descendants of Dickinson. In 1900, Alexander McDowell Nation, an entrepreneur, purchased Appleton Estate from Hill, which had 56 acres of sugarcane plantation. However, seven years later, he died during an earthquake, so possession transferred to the manager, James Miller Farquharson. Farquharson massively expanded Appleton, and in 1916, Farquharson sold the estate to Cecil Verner Lindo of Lindo Brothers & Co., Ltd., who integrated it under their recently purchased J. Wray & Nephew.

In 1970, the distillery at Appleton was modernized, and a visitor center was opened at Appleton in 1988.

In 1997, with the retirement of Owen Tulloch, Joy Spence was made the master blender at Appleton. Her first creation as the master blender was a special rum to celebrate the 250th anniversary of Appleton Estate. It was so well received that after the limited edition run concluded, Appleton Estate Reserve, an 8-year-old blend of pot and column still rums based on the 250th anniversary bottling, was introduced into regular commercial production. Likewise, Appleton Estate's 15-year-old rum was a limited edition introduced exclusively to Canada, but after its success there, the company decided to make that blend a permanent offering in all markets, and introduced Appleton Estate Black River Casks 15-year-old rum in 2021.

At one point, Appleton Estate Extra 12-year did not have enough stocks to produce it, so it no longer carried an age statement, but when stocks returned, it was rebranded to Appleton Estate Rare Casks and began carrying a 12-year age statement again.

On August 5, 2020, after millions of dollars in annual losses, the Appleton Sugar Factory was shuttered, and Appleton now purchases molasses from a common pool, making its rums no longer single-estate rums. The sugarcane grown at Appleton was rerouted to Frome Sugar Factory for processing, until it closed in April 2026 due to metal fragment contamination.

=== The Rum Company Ltd. ===
In 1889, Swiss merchants Jules Fiechter of Basel and Peter Bataglia of Salux founded Fiechter & Bataglia in Basel to import rum and cognac. In 1898, Bataglia resigned and Georges Schmidt joined the company, which was renamed to Fiechter & Schmidt. The company opened a distillery to produce its own brandy, but with the outbreak of World War I, the distillery was taken over by the Imperial German Army and the stills were scrapped for their copper and the machinery repurposed for producing jam for the army. In 1924, Fiechter, along with several businessmen, opened Switzerland's first bonded warehouse in Basel. In 1929, Fiechter's son Jules Fiechter Jr. took over the Basel-based company and relocated to a new building, dubbed the "Coruba House". In the same year, the company founded its subsidiary The Rum Company Ltd. in Kingston, Jamaica, run by Fiechter Jr.'s brother-in-law, Rudolf Waeckerlin-Fiechter, which began a process of distilling rum in Jamaica, ageing it in Basel, and selling it on the European market as Coruba rum.

Despite difficulties, the company continued to operate and distribute rum through World War II, and following the conclusion of the war, the company expanded to new markets, such as the United States, Australia, and New Zealand. Coruba rum was also used in flavourings, ice cream, chocolate, and tobacco. Due to the political instability in Jamaica and the owner's desire to return home to Switzerland, Compagnie Rhumière de Bâle was sold to Consolidated International Corporation Ltd., J. Wray & Nephew's holding company, in 1965.

In 1993, the board of directors of The Rum Company Ltd. voted to sell most of its stocks to its affiliate, Haecky Drink and Wine AG, which included the rights to the Coruba brand in Europe. Campari, through its purchase of Lascelles deMercado Group, retains the production and distribution rights to Coruba in Jamaica, the US, and the UK.

=== J. Wray & Nephew ===
==== John Wray and his nephew ====
In 1825, wheelwright John Wray opened "The Shakespeare Tavern" in Kingston, strategically located right next to Theatre Royal. His business model involved blending rums of various sources and of different qualities to create a product which was consistent in quality, and whose flaws were well-hidden. Soon, his tavern attracted patrons who wanted not just rum, but Wray's rum in particular.

As business was increasing and Wray was looking to expand, he brought his nephew, Charles James Ward, into the business as a partner in 1860, and the tavern was renamed to "J. Wray & Nephew". Wray retired in 1862, and under Ward's leadership, the company moved its headquarters to a larger location on Port Royal Street, near the wharves for easier export of rum. Ward developed the tavern and liquor-dealing concern into one of Jamaica's largest exporting commercial enterprises, and opened approximately 30 rum bars in Kingston.

At the International Exhibition held in London in 1862, J. Wray & Nephew won three gold medals for its 10-, 15- and 25-year-old rums, notably all aged in Jamaica, while the norm was to send rum unaged to the UK for ageing. Wray died in 1870, leaving Ward as the owner of the business. Before his death in 1913, Ward also secured ownership of several estates, including Monymusk in 1884. The brand expanded into other spirits, and by 1885, they had pimento dram, white ginger wine, rum shrub, stomachic bitters, orange wine, and prune dram. In 1907, an earthquake destroyed the theatre next to J. Wray & Nephew. So, Ward rebuilt the theatre and gifted it to the city of Kingston in 1912, now named Ward Theatre in his honour.

==== The Lindo family ====
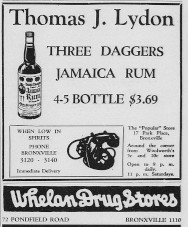
Advertisement of Three Daggers rum in the Bronxville Review, 1937

Following Ward's death on 7 December 1913, in 1916, the trustees of J. Wray & Nephew sold the company to Cecil Verner Lindo of Lindo Brothers & Co., Ltd. The same year, the new company, J. Wray & Nephew Ltd., purchased the Appleton Estate and began improving it, such as building two new ageing warehouses and a bottle washing and filling line powered by electricity. They also created the Applemony brand. Their expansion continued with the purchases of Amity Hall and Moreland Estates in 1927. By the 1930s, J. Wray & Nephew was storing over one million gallons of rum, and fought the newly created Jamaican Spirit Pool Association's production caps, securing alternative terms. They also began producing "Three Daggers" rum, a rum made from the distillate of fermented sugarcane juice instead of molasses. In 1939, Lindo Brothers & Co., Ltd. sold J. Wray & Nephew to the company's manager, Percy Lindo, in his personal capacity.

Due to a whiskey shortage during World War II, Appleton Estate worked to produce a rum that could stand as a substitute, and the result was "Appleton Estate Special". Since rebranded and currently sold as Kingston 62, this Scotch replacement was sold at 40% ABV, illegally strong at the time, so it was only for serving in private settings. However, its popularity and demand grew, causing public taverns to stock it, and bartenders hid it from law enforcement officers on lower shelves, earning it the nickname "Bend Down". It was also the first time that a rum branded as Appleton Estate was sold. Ownership of the company transferred to Percy Lindo's two sons, who then sold the company in 1957 to a group consisting of the shareholders of Lascelles deMercado Group, the Henriques Bros. Ltd. (who also own New Yarmouth Estate), and Sir Harold Mitchell, each purchasing a 1/3 stake.

==== Corporate ownership ====
In 1960, there was a merger between the rum holdings of J. Wray & Nephew, Seagram (namely Captain Morgan rum), and the Edwin Charley brand, forming the Consolidated International Corporation Ltd. (CIC). As part of the deal, J. Wray & Nephew has the rights to produce Captain Morgan rum in Jamaica (separate from Diageo's Captain Morgan rum) to this day. In 1965, CIC acquired The Rum Company Ltd. from Compagnie Rhumière de Bâle, acquiring the Coruba brand. In 1970, CIC was renamed to Wray & Nephew Group Ltd. This group then moved the headquarters from Port Royal Street to Spanish Town Road in 1971, where they remain to this day.

In 1986, Wray & Nephew Group acquired Henriques Bros. Ltd., which included the New Yarmouth Estate, with its sugar factory and distillery. Appleton V/X was released in 1987, becoming the Appleton brand's flagship rum. In 1989, Lascelles deMercado Group bought J. Wray & Nephew from Wray & Nephew Group, making J. Wray & Nephew a wholly-owned subsidiary of Lascelles deMercado Group. In 1997, Joy Spence was made the master blender at J. Wray & Nephew—the first woman ever to occupy this position in the industry.

In 2002, Lascelles deMercado Group acquired Edwin Charley Jamaica Ltd., Estate Distributors (including Daniel Finzi & Co.), and Sangster's, combining them with J. Wray & Nephew to form Wray and Nephew Group Ltd. In 2008, 86.6% of Lascelles deMercado Group was purchased by CL Financial, a conglomerate from Trinidad and Tobago that also owns Angostura, for US$1,200,000,000. The following year, the company experienced a financial crisis, and sold rights to distribute Appleton and Coruba to Kobrand Corp. They later sold 81.4% of J. Wray & Nephew and full control over Appleton Estate to the Campari Group in late 2012, which then bought back the distribution rights from Kobrand. In 2021, the company launched Wray Forward, a program to support UK Black founders and businesses.

The Shakespeare Tavern still operates as Wray's Tavern.

== Organization ==
Joy Spence is the master blender at J. Wray & Nephew, and David Morrison is a senior blender and her likely replacement when she retires. For reasons of business continuity, Campari enforces a rule that Joy Spence and David Morrison should avoid travelling together and never fly on the same flight.

=== 2008 labour dispute ===
In 2008, a labour dispute arose when J. Wray & Nephew Ltd. laid off 20 individuals, claiming that they were made redundant. The company let them go and replaced them with outsourced labour, claiming financial hardship and a need for austerity. The union representing them, the Union of Clerical, Administrative and Supervisory Employees (part of the National Workers Union), filed suit, claiming that they were not redundant, and sought to have them reinstated. On 31 August 2009, the Industrial Disputes Tribunal ruled in the union's favour and ordered the workers to be reinstated.

Following the ruling, J. Wray & Nephew sought to appeal the decision at the Supreme Court. However, the Supreme Court refused to review the decision, stating that the company didn't demonstrate grounds for appeal.

=== The battles over Jamaican geographical indication ===
J. Wray & Nephew has been a proponent of the 2016 Jamaican rum geographical indication (GI), with Joy Spence being the chairwoman of the Jamaican GI project, and also supports the 2024 amendments by JIPO to disallow ageing rums abroad for the GI. National Rums of Jamaica (NRJ) filed a complaint with the Fair Trading Commission (FTC) that this amounts to an anti-competitive practice, and the FTC has launched investigations into the allegations. J. Wray & Nephew holds the largest stock of aged rum in Jamaica as well as more than half of the island's sugarcane crop, and NRJ alleges that they abuse their dominance, engage in price fixing, and are conspiring to restrict competition via this GI.

NRJ also appealed this decision to the Supreme Court, which, on September 19, 2025, sided with NRJ and issued a temporary injunction against the changes made to the GI by JIPO, not allowing the SPA to process any applications under the new GI certification. J. Wray & Nephew filed to be removed as a defendant in this suit, but the court denied this motion due to J. Wray & Nephew's "direct, adversarial commercial interest" against NRJ.

== Production ==
The rum produced by J. Wray & Nephew starts from molasses, though historically, they also made rums from sugarcane juice reduced to a syrup. The molasses at Appleton is diluted using limestone-filtered spring water, pasteurized, and adjusted for pH and sugar content. The molasses is then pumped into tanks and impurities settle out through gravity. Appleton primarily produces aged rums with a low ester profile, while New Yarmouth produces a larger diversity of rums, including some relatively high ester rums.

At Appleton, the wash is fermented for 36 hours in temperature-controlled tanks using a proprietary estate-grown cultured yeast until it reaches an alcohol content of 7% ABV. Then it is distilled in pot and column stills, and every still uses the same wash. The pot stills are traditional Jamaican double-retort pot stills, consisting of a distillation pot, low wine, and high wine retorts, from which the final rum exits at 80-90% ABV. Appleton's distillery has a row of five such stills, manufactured by Forsyths entirely from copper, each with a capacity of 5000 gallons. The column stills are stainless steel with a section made with copper, and can produce anything from light rum to rectified spirit. Appleton has two sets of column stills, one is a double-column and one is a bare column with a mid-column column extension and a rectification column.

All rums at Appleton Estate are aged. Ageing typically happens in once-used American oak ex-bourbon barrels, 40 imperial gallons in volume, which are filled with the distillate at 80% ABV, as well as 1/4 to 1/2 pounds of toasted American oak chips. Since the barrels are already used, a lot of the cellulose and tannins have already been extracted, allowing for longer ageing without the oak properties dominating the profile. Maturation in the hot tropical climate greatly increases both the speed of maturation and the losses to evaporation compared to ageing in Europe. To compensate, barrels are consolidated every three years. Appleton ages around 240,000 barrels at various locations around Jamaica, as an insurance measure against a catastrophe wiping out the entire aged stock. Unlike many other distilleries, such as Foursquare, all ageing warehouses used by Appleton are enclosed. After ageing, the rum is married in a vat to ensure consistency, and diluted to bottling ABV with limestone-filtered spring water before being bottled. Barrel handling has been completely automated and computerized under Joy Spence's tenure. The rum is then passed through a pipeline from the ageing facility to the nearby bottling plant, to avoid having to transport rum in tankers across the nearby four-lane highway. Appleton also has its own cooperage.

Coruba rum is likely a blend of pot and column still rums, aged one to three years, and heavily colored.

As of 2024, J. Wray & Nephew holds 90% of the market share of white overproof rum in Jamaica, through its Wray & Nephew and Charley's JB brands. The marques used for Wray & Nephew are made at New Yarmouth, which, like Appleton, has pot and column stills, but has an even larger distilling capacity, however Appleton makes separate marques.

Due to rapidly rising demand, particularly for the premium Appleton line of products, J. Wray & Nephew has struggled to dispose of its waste dunder, primarily at New Yarmouth. J. Wray & Nephew does not re-use dunder and treats it as waste. Normally to dispose of dunder, it is mixed with soil and used as fertilizer, but this cannot be done in the amounts that is being produced, and it is unsafe to do when the ground is wet from rain. In response, the company has spent US$65,000,000 on a new dunder treatment plant. Bagasse was burnt to generate power for Appleton, however since the shutdown of the Appleton Sugar Factory in 2020 and its bagasse byproduct, the company has begun a transition to solar power.

== Products ==
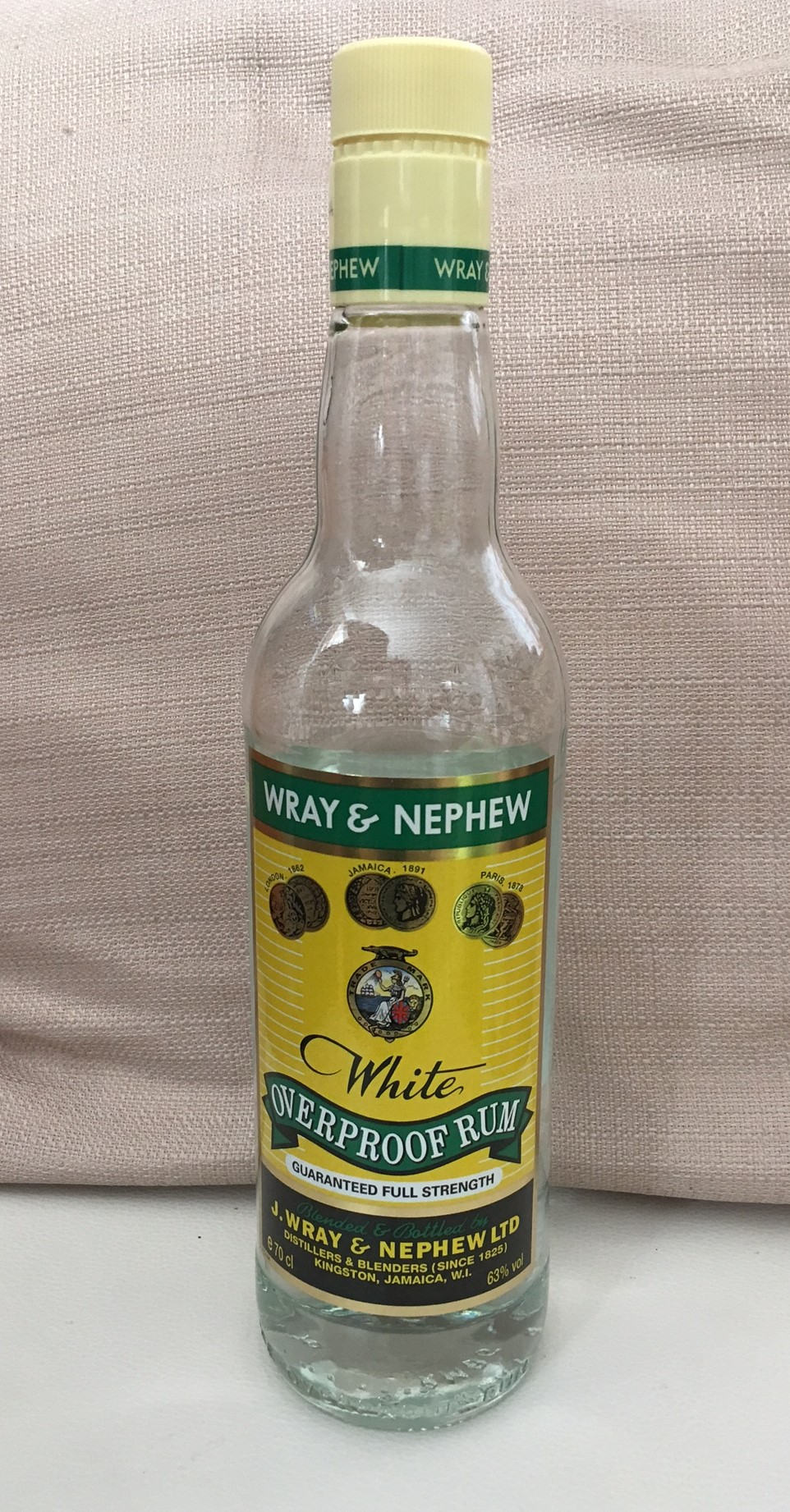
Wray & Nephew white overproof rum

J. Wray & Nephew controls most of the Jamaican white overproof rum market with Wray & Nephew White Overproof and Charley's JB. They also released a version of Wray & Nephew White Overproof at 43% ABV in the UK called Wray's 43. These rums are all distilled at New Yarmouth.

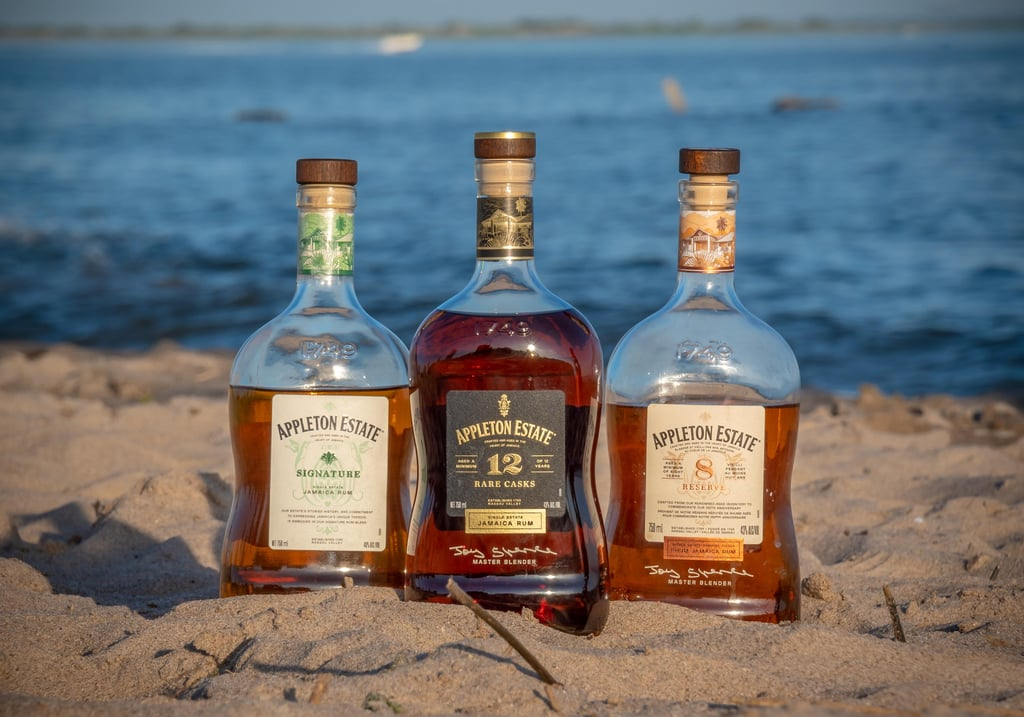
Bottles of Appleton Estate Signature, 8 Year Reserve, and 12 Year Rare Casks

Their Appleton Estate rums have bottlings at several age points, such as 12-year and 21-year. There have also been several vintage releases of Appleton Estate pot still rums as the "Hearts Collection" in collaboration with La Maison & Velier.

Their original Appleton rums, Appleton Estate Special and Appleton Estate White, have been rebranded as Kingston 62 Jamaica Gold and White. In the US and Canada they were rebranded as J. Wray Jamaica Gold and Silver before also being rebranded as Kingston 62 Jamaica Gold and White, and in Jamaica, Appleton Estate White was labeled as Appleton Estate Genesis. These rums are all distilled at Appleton, however, J. Wray & Nephew wanted to reserve the brand "Appleton Estate" to only their more premium rums, so the estate's budget rums were rebranded as Kingston 62. Kingston 62 rums are a blend of unaged and lightly aged rums, with the white variant being stripped of color via filtration through activated charcoal. Every product currently produced by Appleton has a pot still component, except for Kingston 62, which is column still only.

Coruba original dark rum is heavily dyed and has a distinct flavour that is called for in many tiki cocktail recipes. Blackwell Rum is another dark rum made by J. Wray & Nephew Ltd. at Appleton. J. Wray & Nephew also produces several liqueurs. Koko Kanu is a full-strength (37.5% ABV) coconut rum marketed towards the UK. Sangster's is a line of rum creams.

Magnum Tonic Wine is a ready-to-drink fortified wine sold at 16.5% ABV. Besides rum and rum products, J. Wray & Nephew also produces Old Tom gin.

J. Wray & Nephew has also released several one-off "unicorn" bottlings of rum. Rare 1940s bottles of Wray and Nephew rum are valued at $54,000 a bottle. In 2012, Appleton released a 50-year-old rum, saved specifically in 1962 to commemorate Jamaica's independence. Of the original 26 barrels, only 13 remained by 2012 due to losses to evaporation and subsequent consolidation of the remaining stocks. In 2025, Appleton released a 51-year-old rum. Both of these rums broke the record for oldest rum available for sale. A rum that was distilled in 1906 and gifted to US president Ronald Reagan and his dignitaries on their visit to Jamaica in 1982 sold for £31,500 (US$40,000) at auction.

Though they are not produced by J. Wray & Nephew, their network also distributes Averna bitters, Bulldog gin, and Espolon tequila.

== In popular culture ==
=== Jamaican culture ===
The Ward Theatre, the honorary name for Kingston Theatre, was named after Charles Ward, who rebuilt the theatre following its destruction in an earthquake. Wray & Ting, a cocktail made with Wray & Nephew White Overproof rum and Ting grapefruit soda, is very popular in Jamaica, and has been called the nation's "unofficial drink". In 2022, to commemorate Jamaica's 60th anniversary of independence, the Jamaican Ministry of Culture has designated J. Wray & Nephew as "Spirit of Jamaica 60". Minister of Culture Olivia Grange has anointed the company "a proud part of the fabric of the Jamaican society".

=== Tiki culture ===
Wray & Nephew 17 Years was popularized by the Mai Tai, which was created by Victor "Trader Vic" Jules Bergeron Jr. in 1944. Pioneers of the tiki revival, such as Martin Cate, have looked for blends of currently existing rums that could mimic the flavour that Wray & Nephew 17 Years created in Trader Vic's Mai Tai. To pay tribute to its legacy, in 2023, Appleton released the "17 Year Old Legend" rum, with Joy Spence claiming to have read the original recipes and tried to re-create the flavour profile of the 1940s rum.

Coruba is used widely in Tiki cocktails, such as in the Jungle Bird, which was made using Coruba at the Painkiller (PKNY) bar in New York. Martin Cate called it a "staple in tropical drinks" and included it among the 20 rums in his bar's educational program. Once Wray & Nephew 17 Years was running out permanently, Trader Vic experimented with diluting his remaining supply with alternatives, and among them was a blend of Coruba and Red Heart rums.
