= Joy Spence =

Jamaican master blender

- Born: 1951 (age 74–75)
- Citizenship: Jamaica
- Occupation: Master blender
- Employer: Appleton Estate
- Known for: 1st female master blender in the spirits industry
- Awards: Commander of the Order of Distinction (2017)

Joy Spence (born 1951) is a Jamaican chemist and master blender at Appleton Estate. She was the first female master blender in the spirits industry.

== Early life and education ==
Spence was born in Manchester, Jamaica in 1951 and was raised in Kingston by her adoptive parents. Her passion for chemistry began at age 13. Spence attended the University of the West Indies, graduating with First Class Honors in 1972. She then became a teacher and performed lectures on chemistry. She earned her master's degree in analytical chemistry at Loughborough University in England.

== Career ==
Spence started as a research and development chemist at Tia Maria, but stated that she quickly grew bored with just the single product they produced. She then decided to apply to the company next door, J. Wray & Nephew Ltd. In 1981, the rum distillery Appleton Estate, which was owned by J. Wray & Nephew Ltd., hired Spence as its chief chemist.

At Appleton, Spence worked with Owen Tulloch, the master blender at the time, who recognized Spence's ability to identify and differentiate between smells, describing it as an "organoleptic talent". After working with Tulloch for 17 years, Spence was promoted to master blender in 1997 on Tulloch's retirement. Her first creation as the master blender was a special rum to celebrate the 250th anniversary of Appleton Estate, which received high praise in the industry. Spence has created special rum blends for select customers, such as Ronald Reagan, Prince William, and Prince Harry. At Appleton Estate, Spence serves as a brand ambassador, travelling about 40% of the time, and is also the general manager for technical and quality service..

In 1988 and 2008, Spence was a member of the Jamaican Rum Standards committee. Spence was instrumental in achieving geographical indication for Jamaican rum, which was awarded in 2016. She was the chairwoman of the GI project, and several aspects of the Jamaican Rum Standards were incorporated into the Jamaican Rum GI, as well as into the CARICOM Rum Standards.

== Distinctions ==
=== Awards ===
- 2017: Commander (CD) of the Order of Distinction - Officer (OD) in 2005
- 2017: Grand Dame Award by Tales of the Cocktail
- 2018: The Prime Minister's Medal for Science and Technology (now known as the National Medal for Science and Technology)
- 2022: Musgrave Gold Medal
- 2022: Lifetime Achievement Award by The Distilled Spirits Council of the United States.
- '2026: Forbes 50 Over 50 Global list

=== Appleton Estate ===
Tours of the Appleton Estate distillery are named The Joy Spence Appleton Estate Rum Experience. In 2017, Appleton Estate released the Joy Anniversary Blend of rum to commemorate her 20 years as their master blender. Her 40th year at Appleton Estate was marked by the release of the Ruby Anniversary Edition in 2022.

== Personal life ==
Spence is married and has two children.
