= List of rum brands =

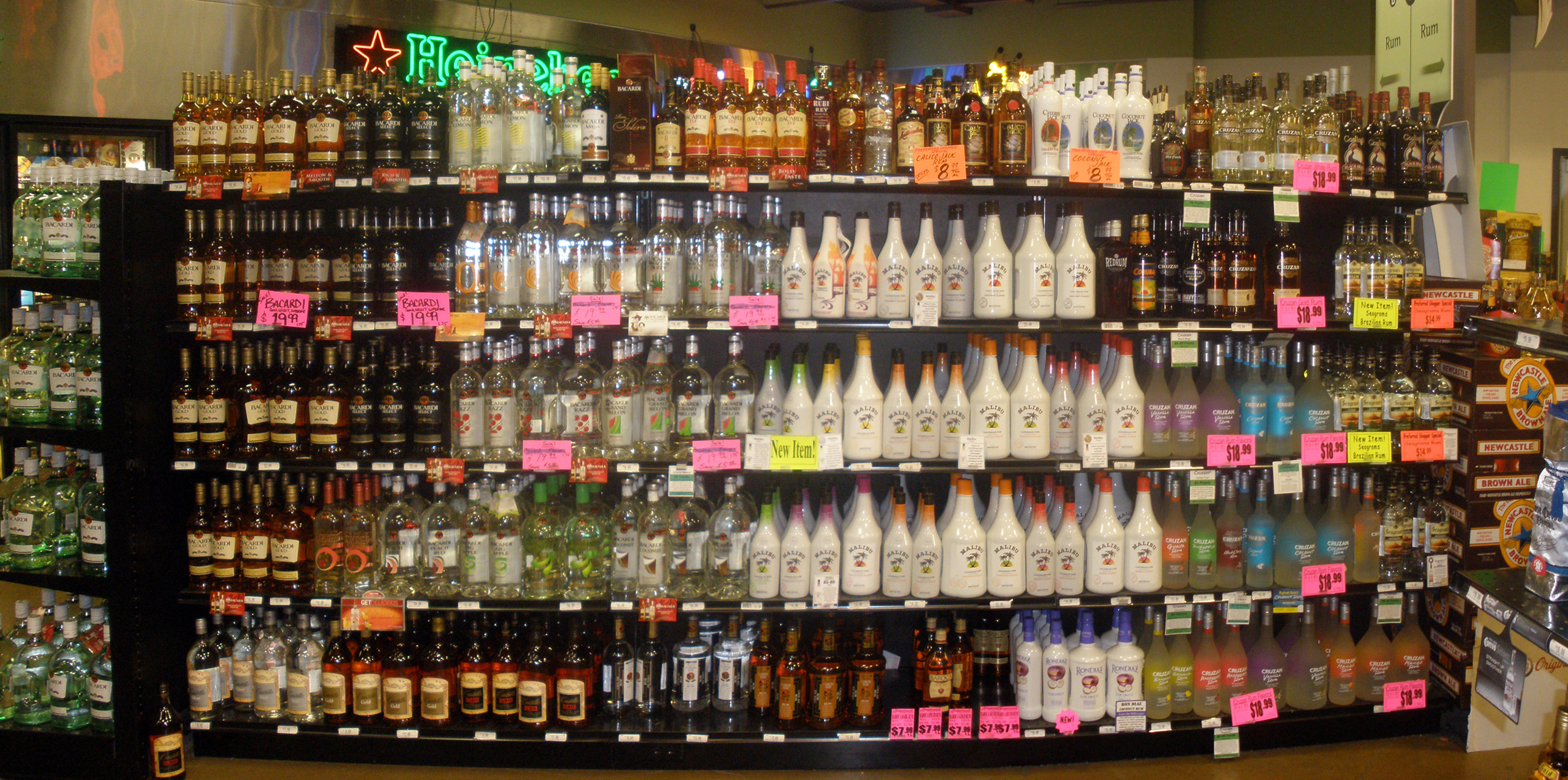
Rum display in an American liquor store (2009)

Rum is distilled in a wide variety of locations by a number of different producers. Below is a list of rum brands and distillers organized by location of the distiller.

== Africa ==
=== Democratic Republic of Congo ===
- Kwilu Rum

=== Kenya ===
- Safari Rum

=== La Réunion ===
- Rhum Charrette
- Riviere du Mat
- Savanna

=== Madagascar ===
- Groupe Vidzar

=== Mauritius ===
- New Grove
- Penny Blue
- Pink Pigeon
- Saint-Aubin

=== Seychelles ===
- Takamaka

=== South Africa ===
- Mainstay Original Premium
- Man Up Rum 55% - (Navy style / Overproof Gold Craft rum)
- MHOBA Rum
- Whistler African Style Rum

== Asia and the Pacific ==
=== Australia ===
- Beenleigh
- Brix Distillers
- Bundaberg
- Darby-Norris Distillery
- Frigate Rum
- Hoochery Distillery
- Husk Distillers (Australian Agricole Rum)
- Illegal Tender Rum Co.
- Inner Circle Rum
- JimmyRum
- Killik Handcrafted Rum
- Kimberley Rum Company
- Nil Desperandum Rum
- Rebellion Bay Spiced Rum
- Waterview Distillery

=== Cambodia ===
- Samai Distillery

=== Fiji ===
- Bati
- Ratu

=== India ===
- Old Monk
- McDowell's No.1 Celebration
- Amrut
- Radico Khaitan

=== Japan ===
- Cor Cor
- Helios Distillery (Okinawa)
- Kikusui Shuzo (Kochi)
- Mizuho Shuzo (Okinawa)
- Nine Leaves
- Ogasawara Rum
- Suntory
- Takaoka Jozo (Kokuto)

=== Philippines ===
- Bleeding Heart Rum Company
- Tanduay

=== Nepal ===
- Khukri Rum
- Khukri Spice

=== New Zealand ===
- Grenada Bay
- Lunatic and Lover
- LWF Distilling
- The NZ Rum Co.

=== Taiwan ===
- Koxinga Gold Rum

=== Thailand ===
- Sang Som
- Issan
- The Distillery Phuket (Chalong Bay Rum)

== Caribbean ==
=== Antigua and Barbuda ===
- Cavalier
- English Harbour

=== Bahamas ===
- Luna Rum
- John Watling's
- Ole Nassau

=== Barbados ===
- The Mount Gay Rum Distillery (owned by Rémy Cointreau)
- West Indies Rum Distillery
  - Bumbu Rum
  - Cockspur Rum
  - Malibu Rum
- Foursquare Rum Distillery
  - Old Brigand Rum
- St Nicholas Abbey

=== British Virgin Islands ===
- Pusser's Ltd.

=== Cayman Islands ===
- 7 Fathoms
- Edward Teach
- Blackbeards
- Tortuga

=== Cuba ===
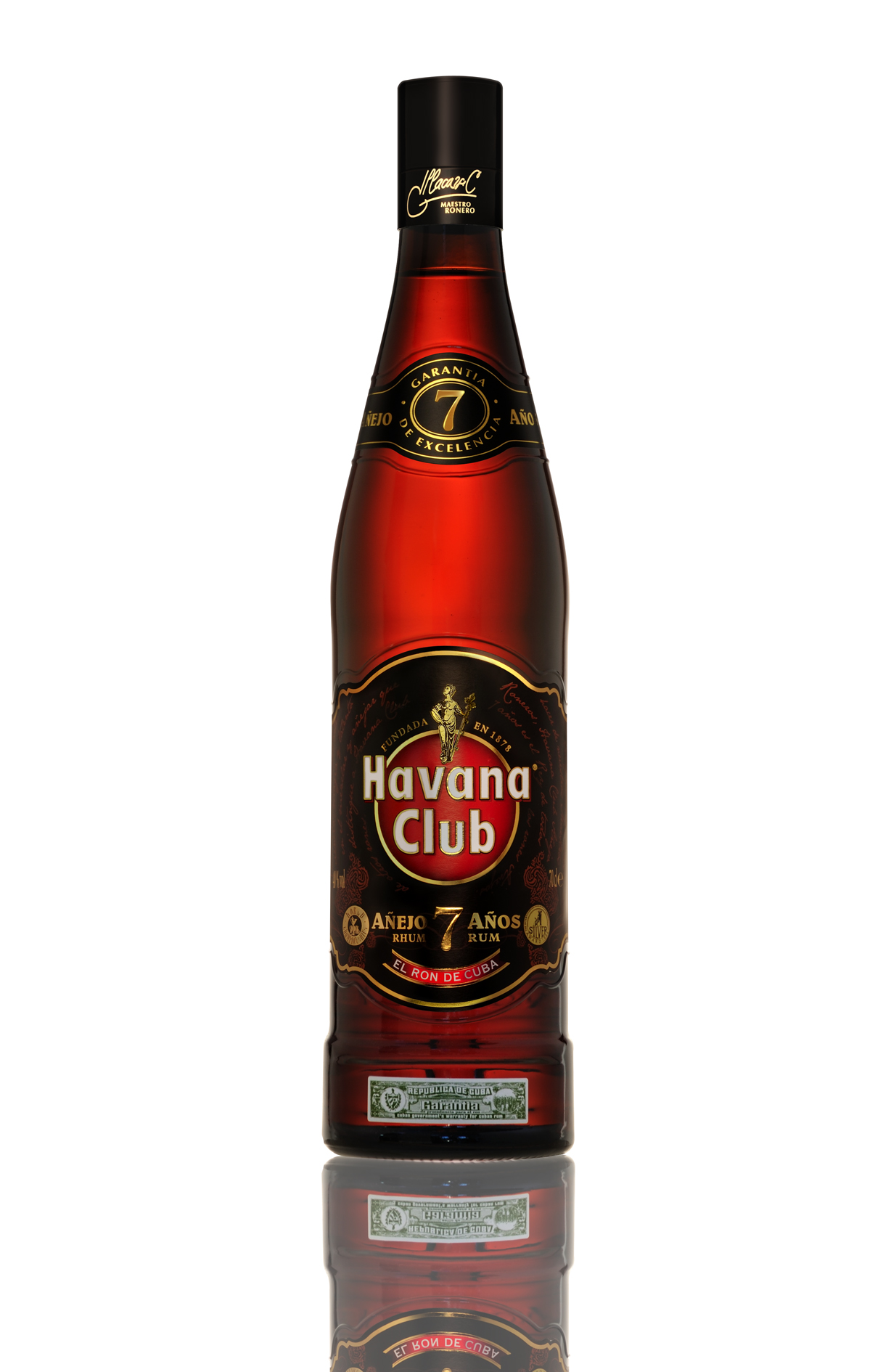
Havana Club 7 años

- Ron Cubay
- Havana Club
- Conde de Cuba
- Ron Vigia
- Ron Caney
- Ron Arecha
- Ron Edmundo Dantes
- Ron Legendario
- Ron Mulata
- Ron Santiago de Cuba
- Ron Varadero

=== Dominican Republic ===
- Barceló
- Bermúdez
- Brugal
- Matusalem
- Candela Mamajuana
- Siboney
- Oliver
- Macorix

=== Grenada ===
- Clark's Court
- Westerhall
- Rivers Rum

=== Guadeloupe ===
- Bielle
- Damoiseau
- Montebello
- Père Labat
- Séverin
- Longueteau
- Reimonenq
- Bologne
- Papa Rouyo

=== Haiti ===
- Rhum Barbancourt
- Rhum Vieux Labbé
- Rhum 1716

=== Jamaica ===
- J. Wray and Nephew
  - Appleton
  - Appleton Estate
- Myers's
- Rum-bar rum
- The Rum Company
- Old Pascas
- Worthy Park
- Hampden
- Smith & Cross

=== Martinique ===
- Habitation Saint-Etienne
- J. Bally
- La Mauny
- Neisson
- Rhum Clément
- Rhum Dillon
- Saint James
- Trois Rivières
- HBS (Habitation Beau Séjour)
- A1710
- JM
- La Favorite

=== Puerto Rico ===
- Bacardi
- Don Q
- Ron del Barrilito
- Club Caribe Destillers

=== Saint Kitts and Nevis ===
- Belmont Estate Rum
- Cane Spirit Rothschild (no longer produced)

=== Saint Lucia ===
- Chairman's Reserve Rum
- Bounty Rum
- Rum 1931
- Rum Admiral Rodney
- TOZ rum

=== Saint Vincent and the Grenadines ===
- St. Vincent Distillers Ltd. (Sunset, Captain Bligh)

=== Sint Maarten ===
- Topper's Rhum Distillery (Cole Bay, Sint Maarten)

=== Trinidad and Tobago ===
- 10 Cane (Moet Hennessy)
- Angostura Rums (Angostura 1824, Angostura 1919, Old Oak, Royal Oak)
- Fernandes Rums (Fernandes Black Label, Forres Park, Vat 19)
- Island Company Rum
- Kraken Rum (Proximo Spirits)
- Forres Park Puncheon

=== US Virgin Islands ===
There are two distilleries in the United States Virgin Islands Diageo subsidiary Captain Morgan and Suntory Global Spirits subsidiary Virgin Islands Rum Industries, Inc. V.I.R.I. Inc. The two distilleries export in the form of intermodal tank containers at high proof and bottle elsewhere. V.I.R.I. Inc. has a proprietary brand Cruzan but produces a great variety of distributor brands.

- Captain Morgan (Diageo)
- Cruzan (Suntory Global Spirits Virgin Islands Rum Industries, Inc)
- 3 Queens Distillery (St. Thomas)
- A.H. Riise (St. Thomas)

== Central and South America ==
=== Argentina ===
- Isla Ñ Rum

=== Belize ===
- Travellers Liquors, Ltd. (One Barrel Rum)
- L&R Liquors, Ltd.

=== Brazil ===
- Oronoco Rum
- Señor Weber Rum

=== Colombia ===
- Parce
- Dictador
- Ron de Caldas
- Ron Medellín
- Ron Hechicera
- Ron Santa Fé

=== Costa Rica ===
- Centenario

=== El Salvador ===
- Ron Cihuatán

=== Guatemala ===
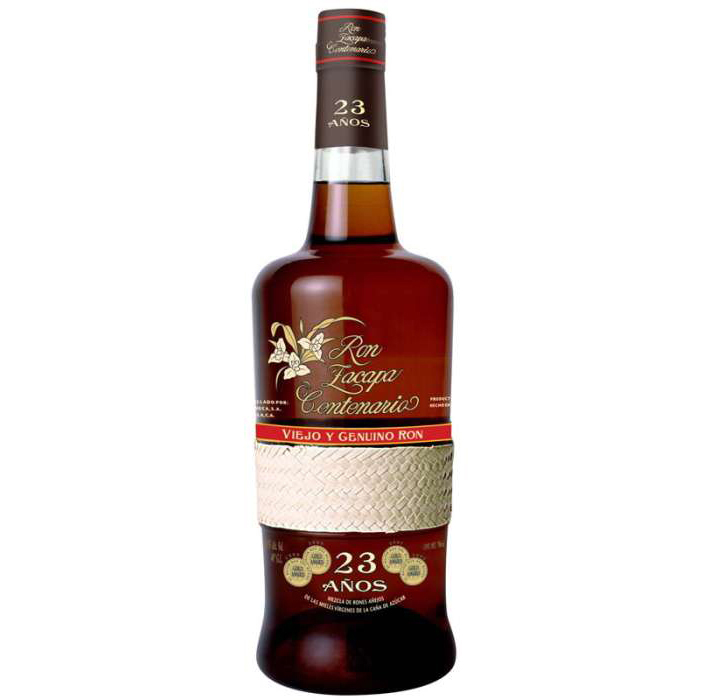
Ron Zacapa Centenario 23

- Ron Botran
- Ron Zacapa

=== Guyana ===
- El Dorado
- Pyrat Rum
- Royal Rum

=== Honduras ===
- Pirate's Grog Rum

=== Mexico ===
- Ron Bacardí
- Ron Huasteco Potosí
- Ron La Gloria
- Ron Macollo
- Ron Mocambo
- Ron MK
- Ron Prohibido
- Alambique Serrano

=== Nicaragua ===
- Flor de Caña
- Ron Mombacho
- Ron Zapatera

=== Panama ===
- Piquero - Premium rum spirit drink
- ARÔME Rum
- 1914 Edicion Gatun Rum
- Cabeza de Vaca Rum
- El Puro Rum
- Don Esteban Rum
- La Marelita Rum
- Isla de Cañas by Don Pancho Rum
- Comandante Overproof Rum
- Portobelo Rum
- Woldorff Private Cask Rum
- La Cruz Vintage 1981 Rum
- Isla de Coiba Rum
- Yolo Rum
- Contadora Rum
- Canalero Rum
- Casa Barú Rum
- Ron Durán
- Calicos Crew Rum
- Carta Vieja Rum
- Pacifico Rum
- Pedro Mandinga Rum
- Bohemio Rum
- Malecon Rum
- Ron El Galante
- Ron Castelauro
- Ron de Jeremy Rum
- Compañero Rum
- Santa Rosa Rum
- Panama Red Rum
- Panama Pacific Rum
- Cortez Rum
- Naud Rum
- Isla del Ron Panama Rum
- Zahara Rum
- Ron Panama Rum
- Nativo Rum
- Serum Rum
- Kuna Rum
- Colibri Artesanal Rum
- El Artesano Rum
- Grander Rum
- Pacifico Rum
- Moko Rum
- Bandita Rum
- El Legado Rum Elixir
- Jumbie Rum
- Caña Brava Rum
- Offrian Rum
- Panamonte Rum
- Selva Rey Rum
- Origenes Don Pancho
- Origenes Maja
- Ron Orígenes Don Pancho
- Ron Calero
- Ron Cañalero
- Ron Zafra
- Grander Rum
- Ron Pedro Mandinga
- Origenes Guazapa
- Ron Abuelo Varela Hermanos

=== Paraguay ===
- Legado Organic Distillery
- Jules Verne
- Marianne de Paraguay
- Papagayo

=== Peru ===
- Cartavio
- Ron Millonario

=== Suriname ===
- SAB Suriname Alcoholic Beverages N.V.

=== Venezuela ===
- Cacique
- Carúpano
- Diplomático
- Pampero
- El Muco
- Ocumare
- Veroes
- Dinastia
- Ron Santa Teresa
- Ron Roble Viejo
- Barrica

== Europe ==
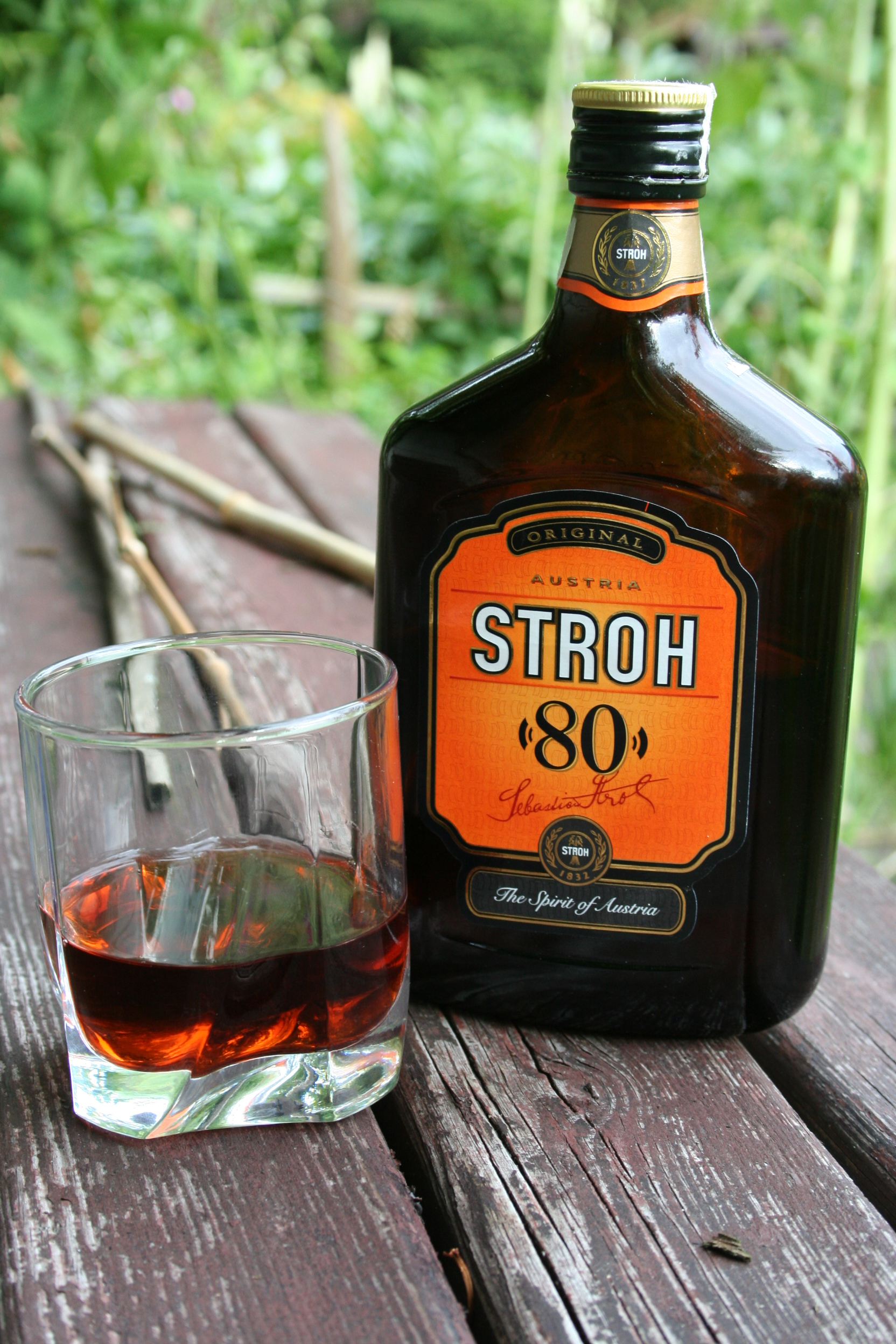
Stroh Rum from Austria

=== Austria ===
- Stroh – flavored rum

=== Czech Republic ===
- Božkov Republica Exclusive

=== Denmark ===
- A.H. Riise

=== France ===
- Maison Ferrand (plantation line of Caribbean and Central American rums)
- Drink Tank Ltd. – the producer of Tank Rum, distilled on the Réunion Island in the south Indian Ocean, thus Tank Rum is a "Product of France"
- BOWS Distillery
- Distillery O'Baptiste

=== Germany ===
- Pott

=== The Netherlands ===
- Zuidam
- Rummieclub

=== Spain ===
- Ron Montero
- Ron Aldea
- Ron Guajiro (Destileria de Tejina)
- Arehucas

=== United Kingdom ===
- Dead Man's Fingers

== North America ==
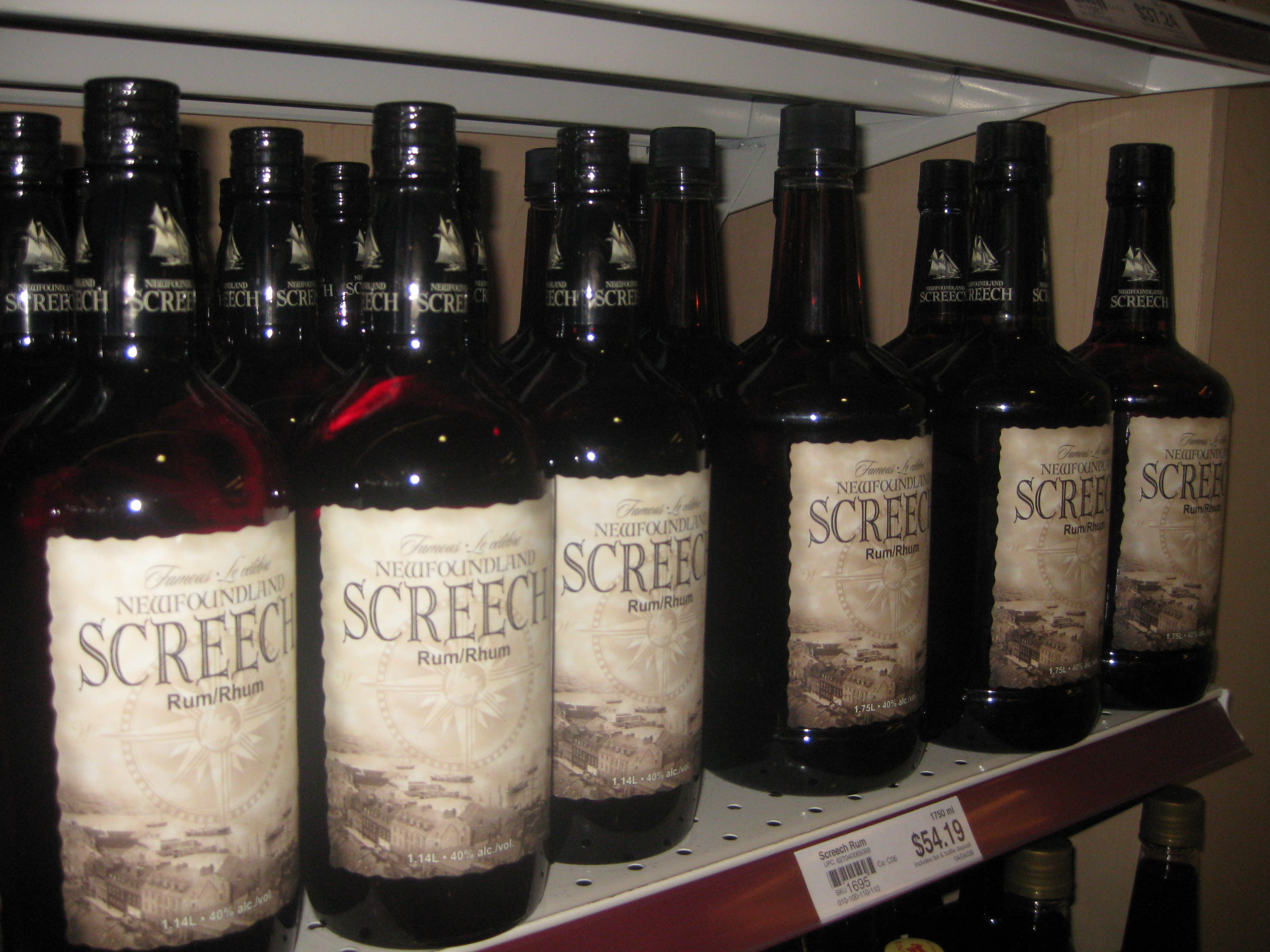
Newfoundland Screech, produced in Canada

=== Bermuda ===
- Gosling Brothers

=== Canada ===
- Newfoundland Screech
- Ironworks Distillery
- Nova Scotia Spirit Co. (Fisherman's Helper Rum)
- Wayward Distillation House (Drunken Hive Rum)
- Chic Choc

=== United States ===
==== Arizona ====
- Desert Diamond Distillery home of Gold Miner Spirits (Kingman, Arizona)
- Grand Canyon Distillery (Williams, Arizona)

==== California ====
- California Spirits Co. (San Marcos, California)
- Charbay Distillery (Napa/Mendecino, California)
- Cutwater Spirits (San Diego, California)
- Lost Spirits (Los Angeles, California)
- Malahat Spirits (San Diego, California)
- Old Harbor Distilling (San Diego, California)
- Selvarey Rum (Hollywood, California)
- Shadow Ridge Spirit Company (Oceanside, California)

==== Connecticut ====
- Connecticut Valley Distillery (Ellington, Connecticut)

==== Delaware ====
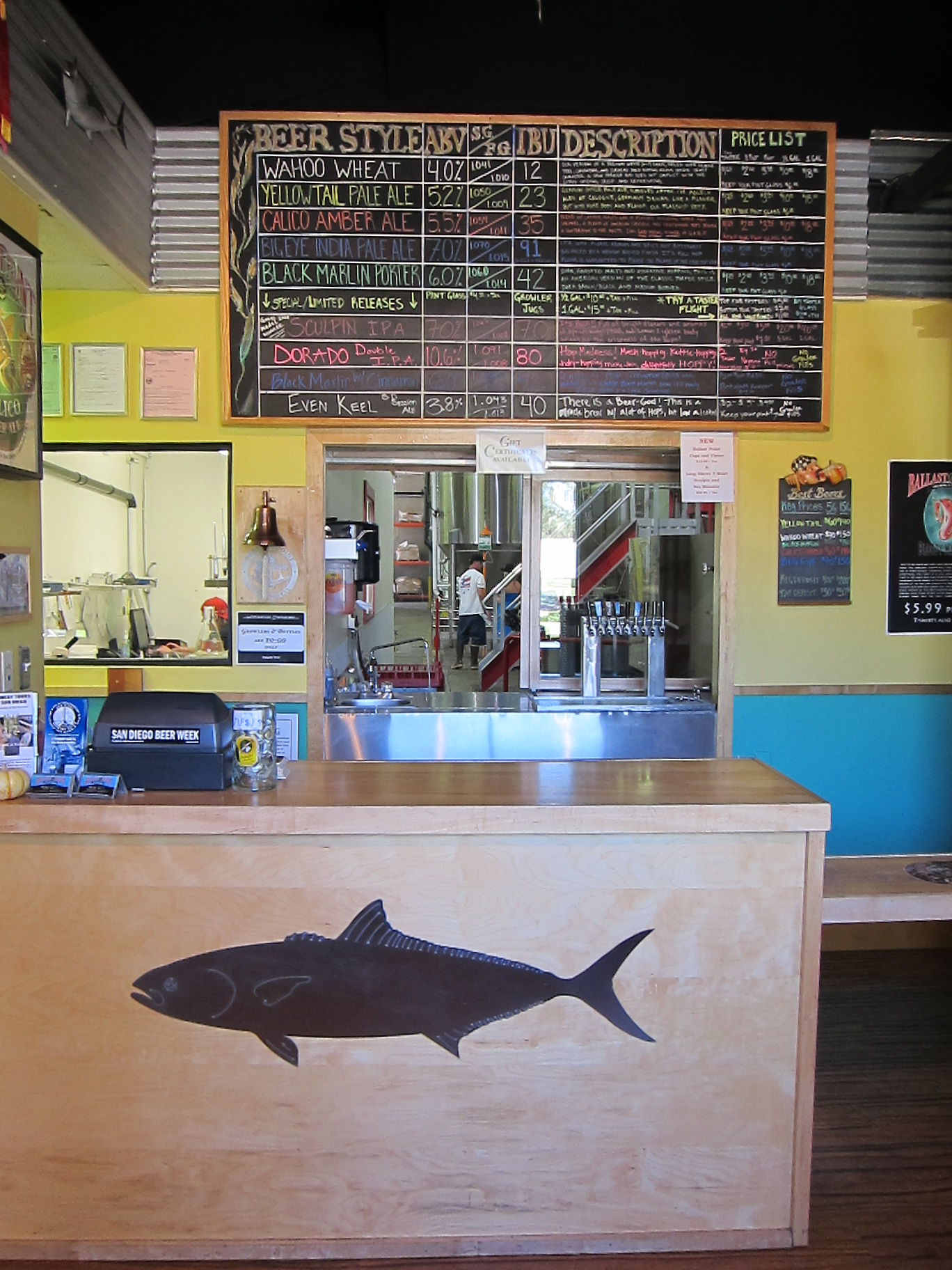
Tasting room at the Ballast Point Brewing Company

- Dogfish Head (Rehoboth, Delaware)

==== Florida ====
- Black Coral Rum (West Palm Beach, Florida)
- Chef Distilled (Key West, Florida)
- Hemingway Rum Company (Key West, Florida)
- Rumcojones (St. Petersburg, Florida)
- Siesta Key Rum (Sarasota, Florida)
- Alligator Bay Distillers (Punta Gorda, Florida)
- Florida Mermaid Rum from NJoy Spirits Distillery (Spring Hill, FL)

==== Georgia ====
- Richland Distilling Company (Richland, Georgia)

==== Hawaii ====
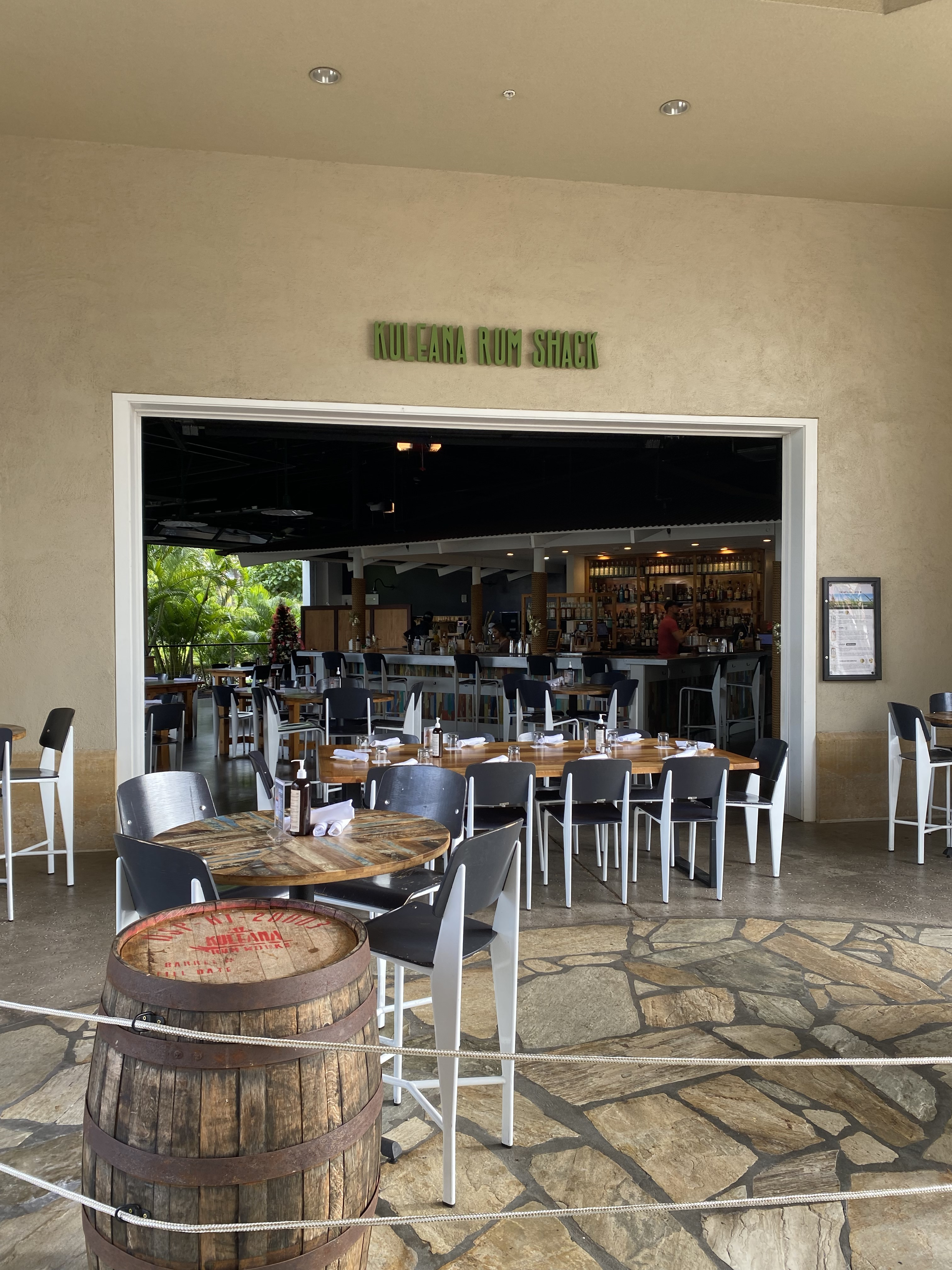
- Kuleana Rum Shack at Queens’ MarketPlace Waikoloa Village, Hawaii
  Kuleana Rum Works (Hawaii)
- Koloa Rum (Hawaii)
- Maui Dark Rum (Hawaii)

==== Indiana ====
- Best Distillery (Elizabeth, Indiana)

==== Iowa ====
- Artisan Grain Rum (Davenport, Iowa)

==== Louisiana ====
- Jean Baptiste Rum (Broussard, Louisiana)
- Three Roll Estate (Baton Rouge, Louisiana)
- Bayou Rum (Lacassine, Louisiana)
- Donner-Peltier Distillers (Thibodaux, Louisiana)
- Old New Orleans Rum (New Orleans, Louisiana)
- Porchjam Distillery/Cheramie Rum (New Orleans, Louisiana)

==== Maine ====
- New England Distilling (Portland, Maine)
- Bartlett Spirits of Maine (Gouldsboro, Maine)
- Wiggly Bridge Distillery (York, Maine)
- Maine Craft Distilling (Portland, Maine)

==== Maryland ====
- Lyon Distilling Company (Saint Michaels, Maryland)
- Seacrets Distilling Company (Ocean City, Maryland)

==== Massachusetts ====
- Boston Harbor Distillery (Boston, Massachusetts)
- Berkshire Mountain Distillers (Sheffield, Massachusetts)
- Triple Eight Distillery (Nantucket, Massachusetts)
- Bully Boy Distillers (Boston, Massachusetts)
- GrandTen Distilling (Boston, Massachusetts)
- Deacon Giles Distillery (Salem, Massachusetts)
- Short Path Distillery (Everett, Massachusetts)
- Rumson's (Salem, Massachusetts)
- Privateer (Ipswich, Massachusetts)
- South Hollow Spirits (Truro, Massachusetts)

==== Michigan ====
- Ugly Dog Distillery (Chelsea, Michigan)

==== New Hampshire ====
- Tall Ship Distillery (Dover, New Hampshire)

==== New Jersey ====
- Cooper River Distillers (Camden, New Jersey)

==== New York ====
- Van Brunt Stillhouse (New York, New York)
- The Noble Experiment (New York, New York)

==== North Carolina ====
- Broadslab Distillery (Benson, North Carolina)
- Lassiter Distilling Company (Knightdale, North Carolina)
- Muddy River Distillery (Belmont, North Carolina)
- Outer Banks Distilling (Manteo, North Carolina)
- Raleigh Rum Company (Raleigh, North Carolina)

==== Oregon ====
- Rogue Spirits (Newport and Portland, Oregon)
- Stillwagon Distillery (Charleston, Oregon)

==== Pennsylvania ====
- Big Springs Spirits (Bellefonte, Pennsylvania)
- Bluebird Distilling (Phoenixville, Pennsylvania)
- Maggie's Farm Rum (Pittsburgh, PA)
- Manatawny Still Works (Pottstown, Pennsylvania)

==== Rhode Island ====
- Coastal Extreme Brewing Company (Newport, Rhode Island)

==== South Carolina ====
- Carolina Moon Distillery (Edgefield, South Carolina)
- Copperhead Mountain Distillery (Travelers Rest, South Carolina)
- Copper Horse Distilling (Columbia, South Carolina)
- Daufuskie Island Rum Company (Daufuskie Island, South Carolina)
- Firefly Distillery (Wadmalaw Island, South Carolina)
- High Wire Distilling (Charleston, South Carolina)
- JAKAL Distillery (Lexington, South Carolina)
- Motte and Sons Bootlegging Co. (Spartanburg, South Carolina)
- Striped Pig Distillery (North Charleston, South Carolina)

==== Tennessee ====
- Prichard's Fine Rum (Kelso, Tennessee)

==== Texas ====
- Railean Rum (San Leon, Texas)

==== Vermont ====
- Dunc's Mill (St. Johnsbury, Vermont)
- Mad River Distillers (Waitsfield, Vermont)

== Rum brands present in several countries ==
- Lamb's
- Pyrat Rum
- Rhum Plantation
- Rum Nation
- MHOBA Rum

== See also ==
- List of gins
- List of tequilas
- List of vodka brands
- List of whisky brands
