= Oronoco =

Oronoco may refer to:

Places in the United States

- Oronoco, Minnesota
- Oronoco Township, Minnesota
- Oronoco, Virginia

Other uses

- Oronoco Rum, produced in Brazil

== See also ==
- Orinoco (disambiguation)
