= Gifiti =

Rum-based bitters

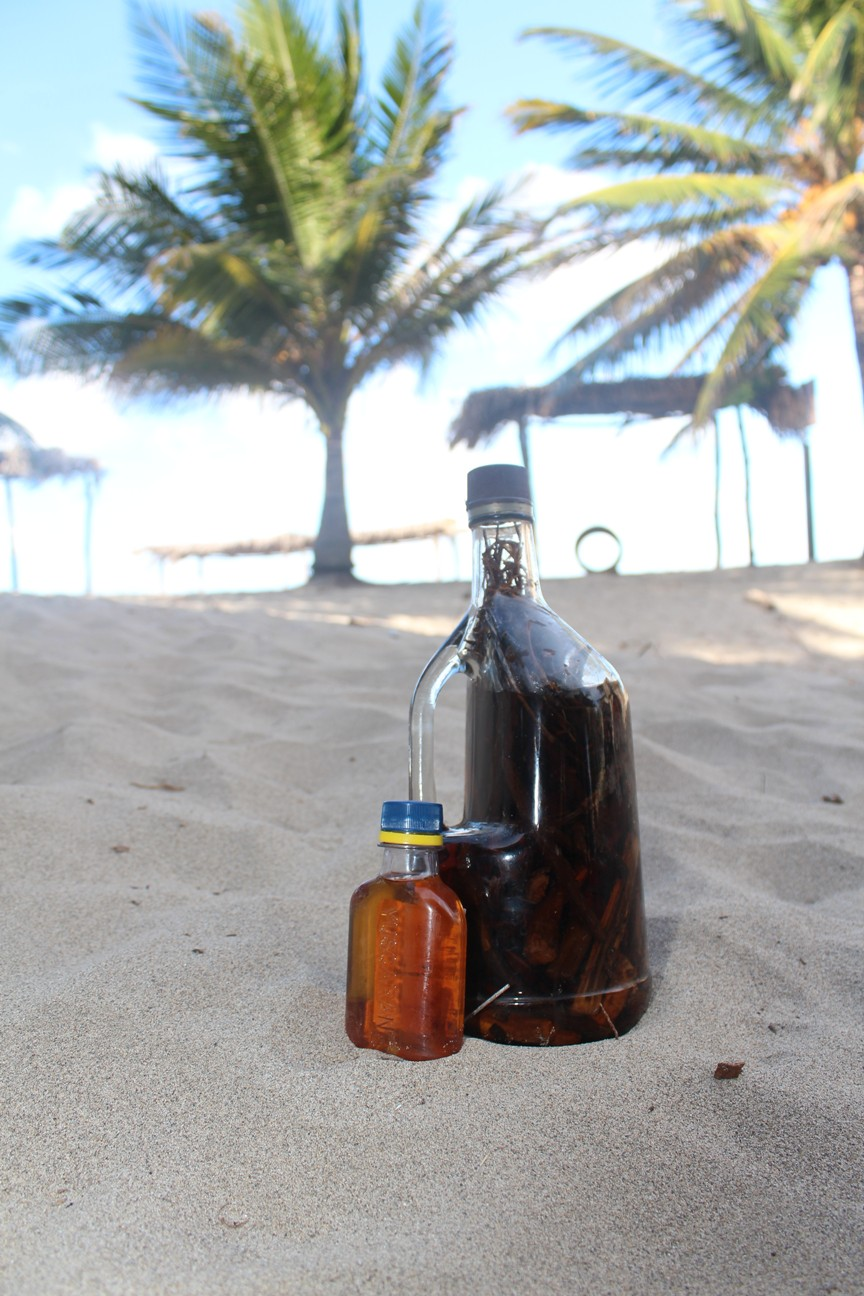
Bottles of gifiti, showing herbs and roots.

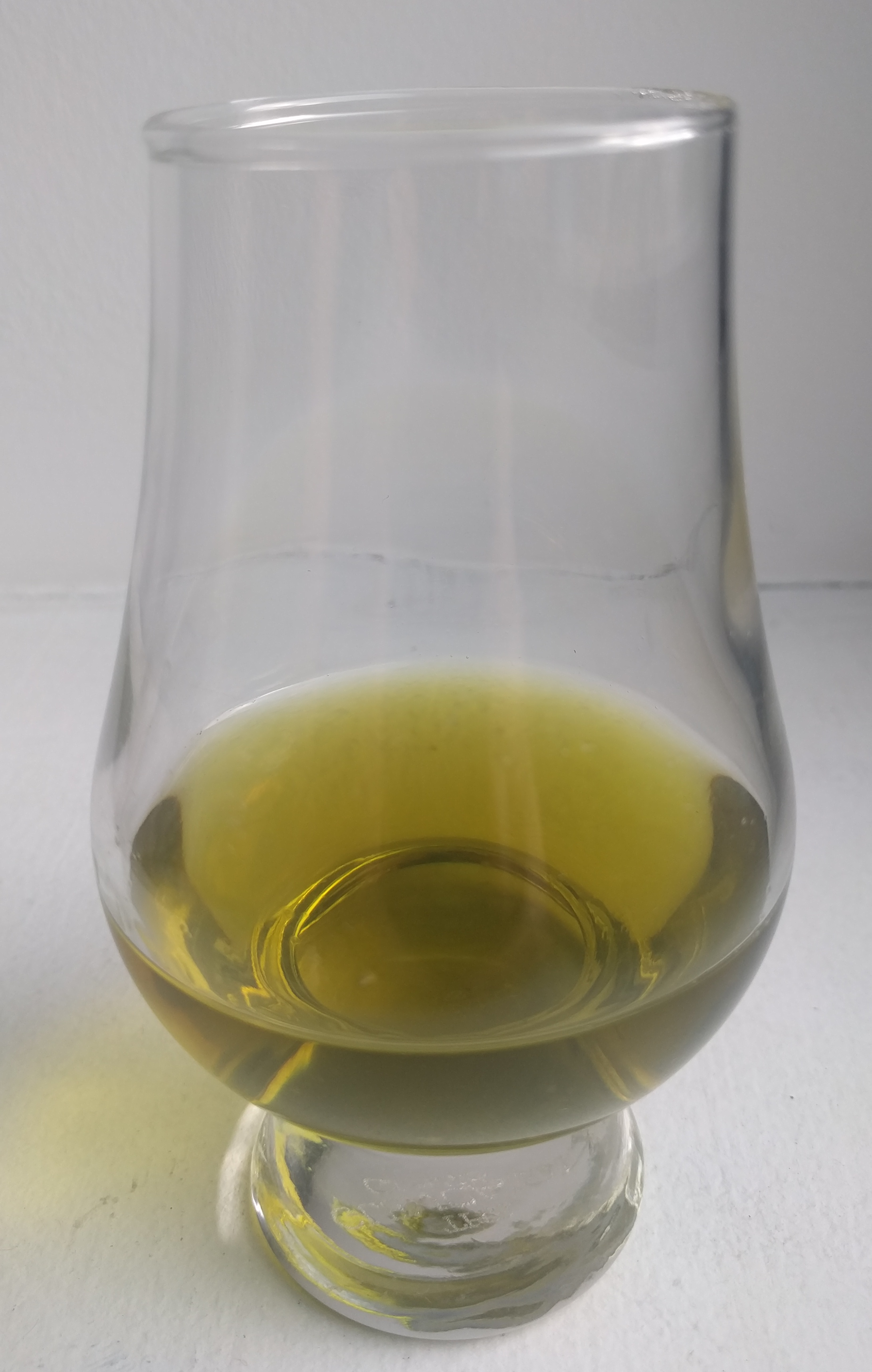
Shot of gifiti by Travellers Liquors

Gifiti (also guifiti, giffidy, geffidee) is a rum-based bitters, made by soaking roots and herbs in rum. It is traditionally made by the Garifuna people of the Caribbean coast of Central America. Gifiti is traditionally used medicinally, with different compositions for men and women, but is also consumed recreationally, most commonly as shots. Color depends on composition; it is often green or brown. It is one of the peculiarities of the Caribbean region.

== Composition ==
Recipes vary, but common ingredients are as follows.

Local ingredients include:

- Chrysobalanus icaco (coco plum)
- Guaco
- Morinda citrifolia (noni)
- Quassia amara (hombre grande, "big man"), particularly for men, as it is reputed to increase male sexual potency (erection strength and duration)
- Smilax ornata (Honduran sarsaparilla)
- Tagetes lucida
- Tilia
- Turnera diffusa (damiana)
- Uncaria tomentosa (vilcacora, cat's claw)

More familiar ingredients include:

- allspice (Pimenta dioica)
- anise
- clove (Syzygium aromaticum)
- chamomile
- garlic (Allium sativum)
- ginger
- whole cane sugar (panela)

== Availability ==
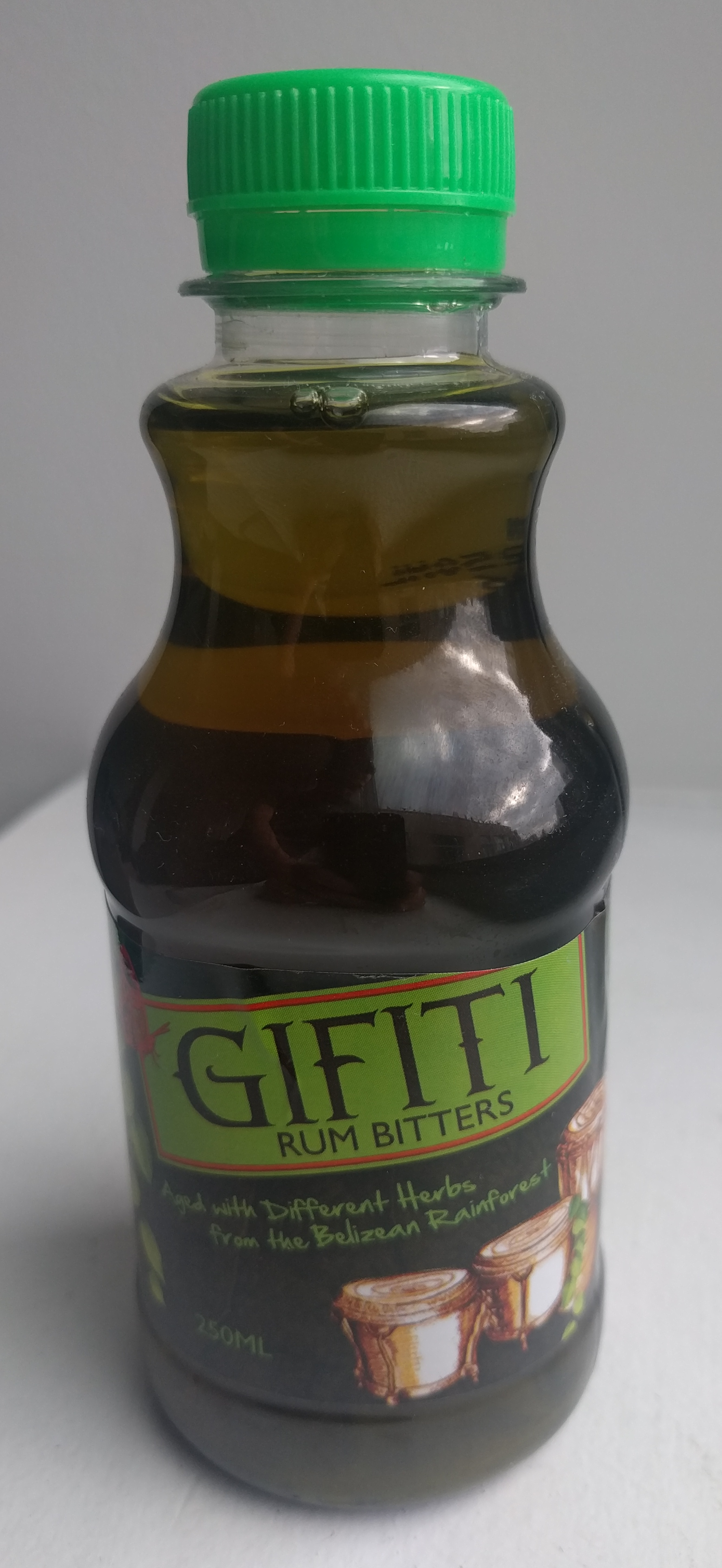
Bottle of commercially available gifiti by Travellers Liquors

Gifiti is common in areas with Garifuna people, notably Honduras, Belize, Guatemala, and Nicaragua. Gifiti is frequently made at home, with varying recipes. It is also available commercially, such as from Travellers Liquors of Belize.
