= Orinoco (disambiguation) =

The Orinoco is a river in Venezuela and Colombia.

Orinoco may also refer to:

== Places ==
- Orinoco Basin, basin formed by the Orinoco river
- Orinoco Belt, an oil field in Venezuela
- Orinoco Delta, a river delta of the Orinoco River, in Venezuela
- Alto Orinoco Municipality, Amazonas, Venezuela
- Caicara del Orinoco, a town in Venezuela

== Other uses ==
- Orinoco (album), a 2019 album by Cimarrón
- "Orinoco Flow", also released as "Orinoco Flow (Sail Away)", a song by Irish singer-songwriter Enya
- ORiNOCO, a Wi-Fi chipset product family
- Orinoco Studios, a former recording studio now part of Miloco Studios in London, England
- Orinoco, a fictional Danube class starship in Star Trek: Deep Space Nine
- Orinoco, a fictional character in the book series The Wombles
- Orinoco (1979 tanker), a tanker that was renamed Rio Orinoco in 1981 and caused an oil spill in the Gulf of St. Lawrence

== See also ==
- Orénoque (1781 ship)
- Orinoko, a novel by Arkady Fiedler
- Oronoco, Minnesota
- Oronoco Township, Minnesota
- Oronoko Charter Township, Michigan
- Oronoque, Kansas
- Oronoque River, a river in Guyana
- Oroonoko, a novel by Aphra Behn
- Oronoque (estate), a Gilded-age estate in Stockbridge, Massachusetts
