= Pampero =

Pampero may refer to:

- El Pampero, first balloon flown by the Argentine aviator Jorge Newbery in the 1910s
- Industrias Pampero, C.A., rum distillery in Venezuela
- Licoreros de Pampero, Venezuelan professional baseball club
- Pampero, a fictional ship from the BBC television drama series The Onedin Line
- Pampero Firpo, surname of Juan Kachmanian, a retired Argentine professional wrestler
- Pampero (multiple rocket launcher), an Argentinian multiple rocket launcher
- Pampero, a southeastern wind in the South American pampas
- Pampero Ropa de Trabajo, an Argentine brand of work clothing and footwear, currently owned by Grupo Cardon.
