= Ron Edmundo Dantes =

Cuban rum brand

Ron Edmundo Dantes is a cuban rum brand produced in Santiago de Cuba. Only 3000 bottles are issued every year. It is a 40% rum, has a golden color and has a little vanilla taste.

Two kinds of rum are proposed:

- The 15 years old in a 0.7L glass bottle
- The 25 years old in a 0.7L porcelain bottle hand decorated with 24 carat gold (150 delivered bottles every year for Spain)

The name of the brand comes from the Count of Monte Cristo book.

== See also ==
- List of rum producers
