= Venezuelan rum =

Protected designation of rum brands

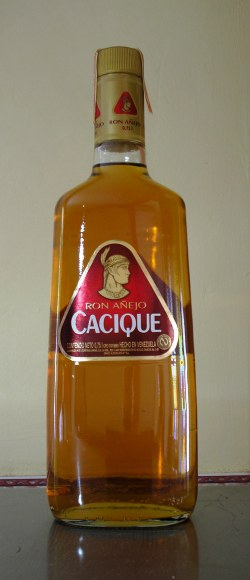
Bottle of Ron Cacique

Venezuelan rum (Spanish: Ron de Venezuela) is a protected designation of origin, granted by the SAPI since 2003, to the rum brands of Venezuela that meet certain quality and origin requirements.

== Requirements of designation ==
The Venezuelan rum designation forbids the alteration of the mixture of rum by use of substances that provide artificial color, flavor or aroma. These requirements also include the rum having, in the entirety of its components, a minimum of two years spent aging in white oak barrels and at least 40% anhydrous alcohol, and that none of the raw materials are mixed with molasses nor alcohol from other countries

This denomination allows to differentiate Venezuelan rums from those of the rest of the world.

=== List of brands ===
The rum brands with this designation are:

- Ron Diplomático
- Ron Santa Teresa
- Ron Roble Viejo
- Ron Carúpano
- Ron Pampero
- Ron Cacique
- Ron Ocumare
- Ron Veroes
- Ron El Muco
- Ron Cañaveral
- Ron Estelar De Luxe
- Ron Tepuy
- Ron Bodega 1800
- Ron Quimera
- Ron Añejo Barrica
- Ron Calazan
- Ron Caballo Viejo
