= Don Papa Rum =

Philippine aged rum brand

- Don Papa Rum logo
- Manufacturer: Bleeding Heart Rum Company
- Distributor: Diageo (2023–present)
- Origin: Philippines
- Introduced: 2012; 14 years ago
- Website: Official website

Don Papa Rum is an aged rum owned by Bleeding Heart Rum Company of the Philippines.

== History ==
Don Papa was founded by then Rémy Cointreau executive Stephen Carroll. During a trip to Bacolod, Carroll heard stories of the area having the finest sugarcane in the world. Until that time, Philippine rum had been distilled in other parts of the country.

He founded Bleeding Heart Rum Company to manufacture the rum in Negros, which is considered the sugarcane capital of the country. Don Papa is named after Papa Isio, a Negrense religio-political rebel leader during the Philippine Revolution during the 1890s.

Don Papa debuted in Bacolod in 2012, then Manila later that same year. The brand has since become available in international markets such as the United Kingdom and Spain. Don Papa became available in the United States in 2017.

In January 2023, Diageo agreed to acquire Don Papa for an initial €260 million (US$281.5m). On March 10, 2023, the acquisition was completed.

== Production ==
Don Papa Rum is produced with a molasses base from an old strain of sugar cane. The molasses is milled by existing sugar mills in Negros and is referred to as "black gold." The fermented molasses is then aged a minimum of seven years in casks.

There is controversy among rum enthusiasts regarding the use of additives such as glycerin, vanillin, added sugar, caramel color and other ingredients in the production of Don Papa. Some contend that because of the use of such ingredients and their impact on flavor profile and texture, Don Papa should be labeled "Imitation Rum" instead. A class action suit has been filed in May 2022 in Illinois alleging that Don Papa should not be labeled "Rum", as the undisclosed use of additives could be misleading consumers.

== Canisters ==
In the years since Don Papa launched, 40 different canisters for its bottles have been released. The canisters are considered art pieces in their own right, and some are valuable collectibles. Below is a list of released designs.

- Don Papa 7 year canisters - Small Batch - Single Island - and the Babaylanes - Art La Reverie de Papa Isio - Flora & Fauna - Secrets of Sugarlandia - Single Island 20th Years Premium Spirits - Eternal Spring in Sugarlandia - Don Papa 7y - Don Papa 7 year - Botany - Cosmic - Eglusha - Field notes for Papa Isio - Passage to the land of Sugar - Sugarlandia - The Spiritual landscape of Papa Isio - Timeless Landscape - Vintage Edition
- Don Papa Baroko canister - Baroko - Baroko Art 2022 CZ - Christmas - Eternal Spring In Sugarlandia - Harvest - Secrets of Sugarlandia
- Don Papa Masskara canister - Masskara - Street Art - Don Papa Masskara
- Don Papa 10 year canister - cork - metal
- Don Papa Port cask canister - Port Cask - Port Cask Quincentennial edition
- Don Papa Rye Aged - Rye Aged - Rye Aged SE
- Don Papa Sevillana - Sevillana - Sevillana SE
- Don Papa Sherry Cask - Sherry Cask
- Don Papa Rare Cask - Rare Cask - Rare Cask 2018

== See also ==
- List of rum producers
