= Rum-Bar Rum =

Brand of Jamaican rum

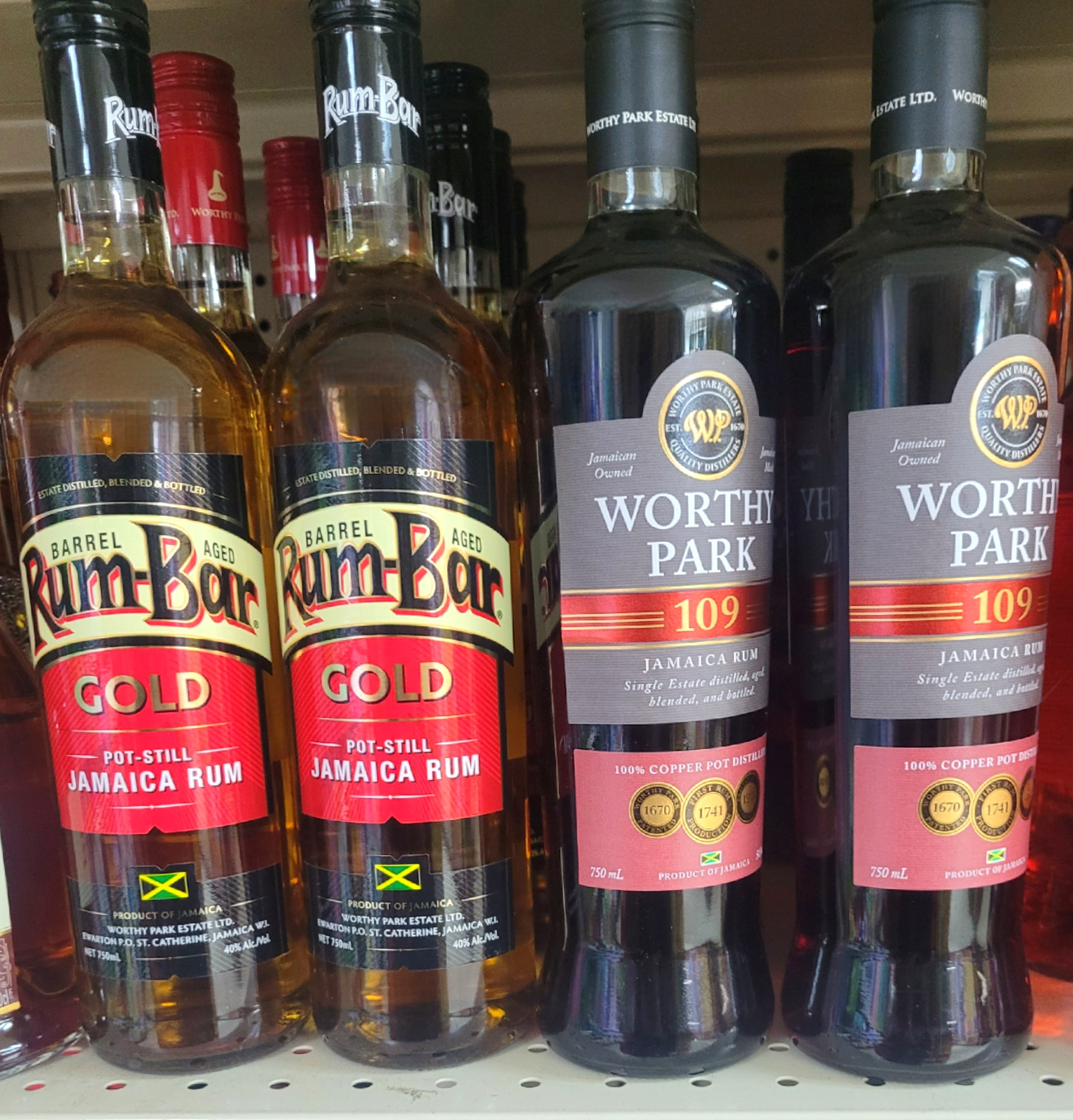
- Rum-Bar Gold at a liquor store.
- Type: Distilled beverage
- Origin: Jamaica, Caribbean
- Introduced: 2007
- Alcohol by volume: 40% or 63%
- Color: Clear or gold
- Related products: rum
- Website: www.rumbarrum.com

Rum-Bar Rum is a brand of rums produced in Jamaica and sold worldwide by Worthy Park Estate.

== History ==
The Worthy Park Estate in Jamaica was founded in 1670, and produced its first rum in 1741. However, it wasn't until it built a new distillery in 2005 that it released its first rum after a decades-long hiatus in 2007. Named Rum-Bar, it was a 65% white overproof rum designed to compete with other white Jamaican rums like Wray & Nephew. Since its introduction, the Rum-Bar brand has been expanded to include Rum-Bar Rum Cream, a cream liqueur made with a blend of 100% real cream and Rum-Bar Rum; Rum-Bar Gold, a 4 year old premium gold rum; Rum-Bar Silver, a lighter 40% ABV all-purpose white rum; and a line of Rum-Bar vodkas, which includes classic and green apple varieties. The original Rum-Bar was also renamed to Rum-Bar Overproof, and reduced from 65% ABV to 63% ABV.

== See also ==
- List of rum producers
