= Ron Zacapa Centenario =

Guatemalan rum

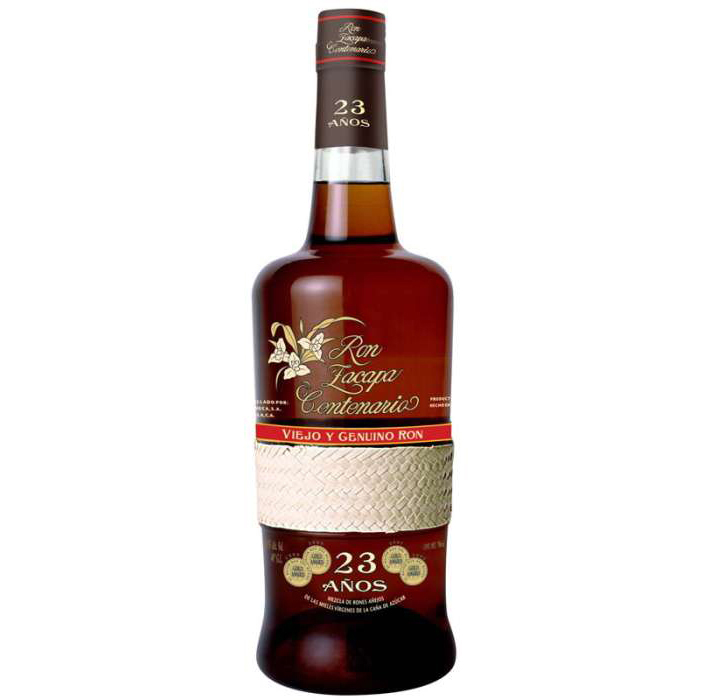
- Ron Zacapa Centenario 23
- Type: Rum
- Manufacturer: Industrias Licoreras de Guatemala
- Distributor: Diageo
- Origin: Guatemala
- Introduced: 1976; 50 years ago
- Website: Ron Zacapa website

Ron Zacapa Centenario is a premium rum brand produced in Guatemala by Rum Creation and Products, a subsidiary of Industrias Licoreras de Guatemala, and distributed and marketed by Diageo. Zacapa Centenario was created in 1976 to celebrate the hundredth anniversary of the foundation of Zacapa, a town in eastern Guatemala. It was the result of the blending, stabilization and maturing processes of long-aged rums by doctor and chemist named Alejandro Burgaleta. Unlike most rums, Ron Zacapa rums are made from sugar cane juice rather than molasses, and are aged in a facility at a high altitude with natural coolness which affects the maturation process.

== History ==
Zacapa is a small town in eastern Guatemala founded in 1876. The rum was named "Centenario" (Centennial in Spanish) to honor its 100th anniversary in 1976. The name Zacapa means "on the river of grass" in the Aztec Nahuatl language. Early Zacapa bottles came in a bottle covered in a petate – a handwoven matting made from palm leaves which dates from the Mayan period made in Esquipulas, near the borders with Honduras and El Salvador, by traditional hat artisans. More recently, they feature a band around the middle of the bottle. Ron Zacapa Centenario 23 used to be known as Ron Zacapa Centenario 23 Años. In 2008, Diageo gained exclusive distribution rights to Ron Zacapa Centenario, and In July of 2011, Diageo purchased a 50% stake in Ron Zacapa, forming Rum Creation & Products Inc. Also 2011, the bottles were redesigned to have a band rather than a full petate sleeve, and its name changed due to the confusion it caused, as people thought it was a 23-year-old rum instead of a blend of rums between 6 and 23 years old.

== Production ==
Diagram of the Sistema Solera aging and blending process of Ron Zacapa Centenario 23 rum. Each step is aged for 1.5 years, meaning most rum in the blend is 6 years old, with some from the older stocks up to 23 years old. Ron Botran, El Pasador de Oro, and other Ron Zacapa Centenario bottlings go through a similar process.

Botran and Zacapa rums start from sugarcane from the Tululá Sugar Mill, grown in the volcanic soil of Guatemala. The sugarcane matures in its second year, at which point the field is burned to burn off the leaves of the plants. The sugarcane is squeezed for its juice, which is then reduced to a syrup (called "miel de caña", or sugarcane honey, in Spanish). This is then fermented for 120 hours using Saccharomyces cerevisae, a yeast strain originating in pineapples, and distilled in multi-column stills, producing a light, neutral aguardiente, typical of Spanish-style rum production. The stills have taps at different intervals, allowing the produced rum to come from higher taps, producing lighter, cleaner, stronger spirit, or from lower taps, allowing for a more flavorful spirit. For example, Zacapa 15 is a lighter product and exits from a higher tap at 92% ABV, while Zacapa 23 exits from a lower tap to achieve bolder, fruitier flavors at 88% ABV. This process happens for only two months out of the year, as it's timed to the annual sugarcane harvest.

All Zacapa rums are aged in the "dynamic solera" style, inspired by solera wine aging, where the rum does not have a distinct age, but rather, new rum is added to old rum and blended in a series of casks. The freshly distilled aguardiente is diluted to 60% ABV before the aging process begins. The spirit ages in a series consisting of bourbon barrels, re-charred bourbon barrels, Sherry casks, Pedro Ximénez barrels, all American white oak, and sometimes cognac barrels, made of French oak, for a total of 6 years of aging, with blending in a vat between each stage. During the blending, a small portion of the final product is added, allowing for some of the rum to be much older than 6 years, up to 23 years. Finally, the rum is filtered using cellulose to prevent a cloudy appearance at colder temperatures, before being bottled. All of this occurs at a facility 2.3km above sea level, where the air is cool and moist, which significantly slows loss to evaporation compared to tropical aging.

Rum experts have accused Zacapa of being misleading in their labeling, suggesting that the large 23 on the bottle is likely to mislead consumers into believing that the rum is aged for 23 years. However, the rum is actually a blend ranging from 6 to 23 years, mostly skewed towards the younger end, and disguised with added sugar. In 2021, a class-action lawsuit was filed against Diageo, claiming that consumers were fooled into believing that Ron Zacapa Centenario 23 was aged for 23 years. Likewise, maturation in cool, moist climates significantly slows down the aging process, resulting in a product more comparable to a rum aged for a shorter length of time in a tropical climate.

Despite starting from sugar cane, sugar does not make it past the distillation process, and Zacapa strongly deny that they adulterate the final product in any way. Consumers note that Zacapa rums are particularly smooth and sweet, a result that Zacapa claims comes from the unique aging and blending process. However, independent testing has confirmed that the sugar levels are nearly 20g/L. Likewise, the deep brown color can only be partially attributed to the solera-style aging, as the rum is artificially dyed, and independent journalists have discovered the presence of glycerine, a substance used to add sweetness and mouthfeel to rum.

== Products ==
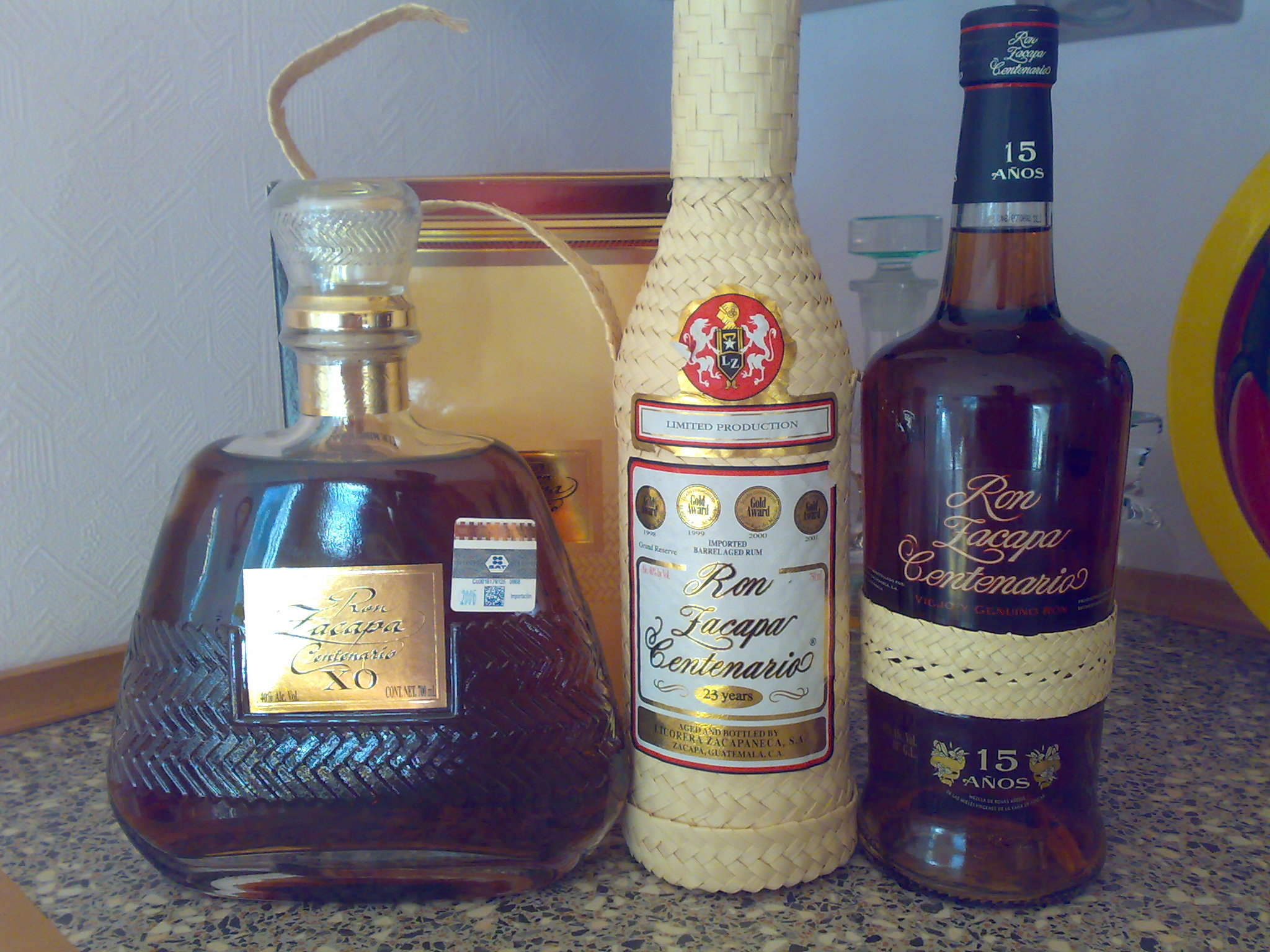
Pre-2011 designs of Ron Zacapa XO, Ron Zacapa 23 Años, and Ron Zacapa 15 Años

- Ron Zacapa Centenario 23 (originally Ron Zacapa Centenario 23 Años) is the flagship expression. After aging, it is briefly blended in oak barrels and then bottled at 40% ABV. The bottle features a straw-colored petate band.
- Ron Zacapa Centenario 15 (originally Ron Zacapa Centenario 15 Años) is a more budget offering. It undergoes the same process as the 23 version, but faster. The bottle features a straw-colored petate band.
- Ron Zacapa Centenario XO is a more premium offering. After aging, it is finished in cognac casks before being bottled at 40% ABV. The bottle is tear drop shaped and features a golden band around the neck.
- Ron Zacapa Centenario Edición Negra is a more premium offering. After aging, it is finished in double-charred oak barrels before being bottled at 43% ABV. The bottle features a black petate band.

== Awards ==
Ron Zacapa Centenario 23 won first place in the premium rums category 4 years in a row at the International Rum Festival 1998, 1999, 2000 and 2001. It was the first rum to be included in the International Rum Festival's Hall of Fame. In 2018, it took gold at the World Rum Awards.
