= 10 Cane =

Trinidadian light rum

- Type: Light rum
- Manufacturer: LVMH
- Origin: Trinidad
- Introduced: 2005
- Alcohol by volume: 40.0%
- Proof (US): 80
- Color: Golden
- Related products: List of rum producers
- Website: www.10Cane.com

10 Cane was a premium Trinidadian light rum brand owned by LVMH. Moët Hennessy introduced 10 Cane in 2005. The product was discontinued in 2015. 10 Cane rum was named after the tradition of hand-harvesting and bundling sugarcane stalks in groups of ten.

== Production ==
10 Cane was a pale gold, light bodied but full flavored rum with tasting notes of pear and vanilla. 10 Cane was often used to create smoother, more fragrant variations of traditional dark rum cocktails such as the Hurricane and the Dark 'N' Stormy. Like cachaça and French or Haitian "rhum agricole", 10 Cane was made from fresh sugar cane juice and blended with aged molasses rum.

The 10 Cane production process was described by Moët Hennessy as "artisanal", using a small batch production process and ingredients of high quality. It was fermented for five days at a low temperature, double-distilled in small batches in French pot stills, then aged in French oak barrels for ten months. This aging process gave 10 Cane its light golden color. Production of 10 Cane was discontinued in 2015, and the official product website (www.10cane.com) no longer functions.

== See also ==
- List of rum producers
