= Industrias Licoreras de Guatemala =

Guatemalan liquor distillery

- Location: Km 16.5 Carretera Roosevelt, Mixco, Guatemala
- Coordinates: 14.6287°N 90.5986°W
- Owner: Rum Creation & Products Inc.
- Founded: c. early 1940s
- Founder: Venancio, Andrés, Felipe, Jesús and Alejandro Botrán

Industrias Licoreras de Guatemala is a Guatemalan alcohol distillery which produces different kinds of alcohol and which owns different brands. It was created by a merging of 4 family-run companies, including Industria Licorera Quezalteca run by the Botrán brothers. It is a private company and it is the biggest of the three distilling companies operating in Guatemala. It is currently run by the CEO and general manager, Luis Ibáñez Guillén, since 2017, and the master blender is Ana Lorena Vásquez Ampie (Lorena Vásquez).

== History ==
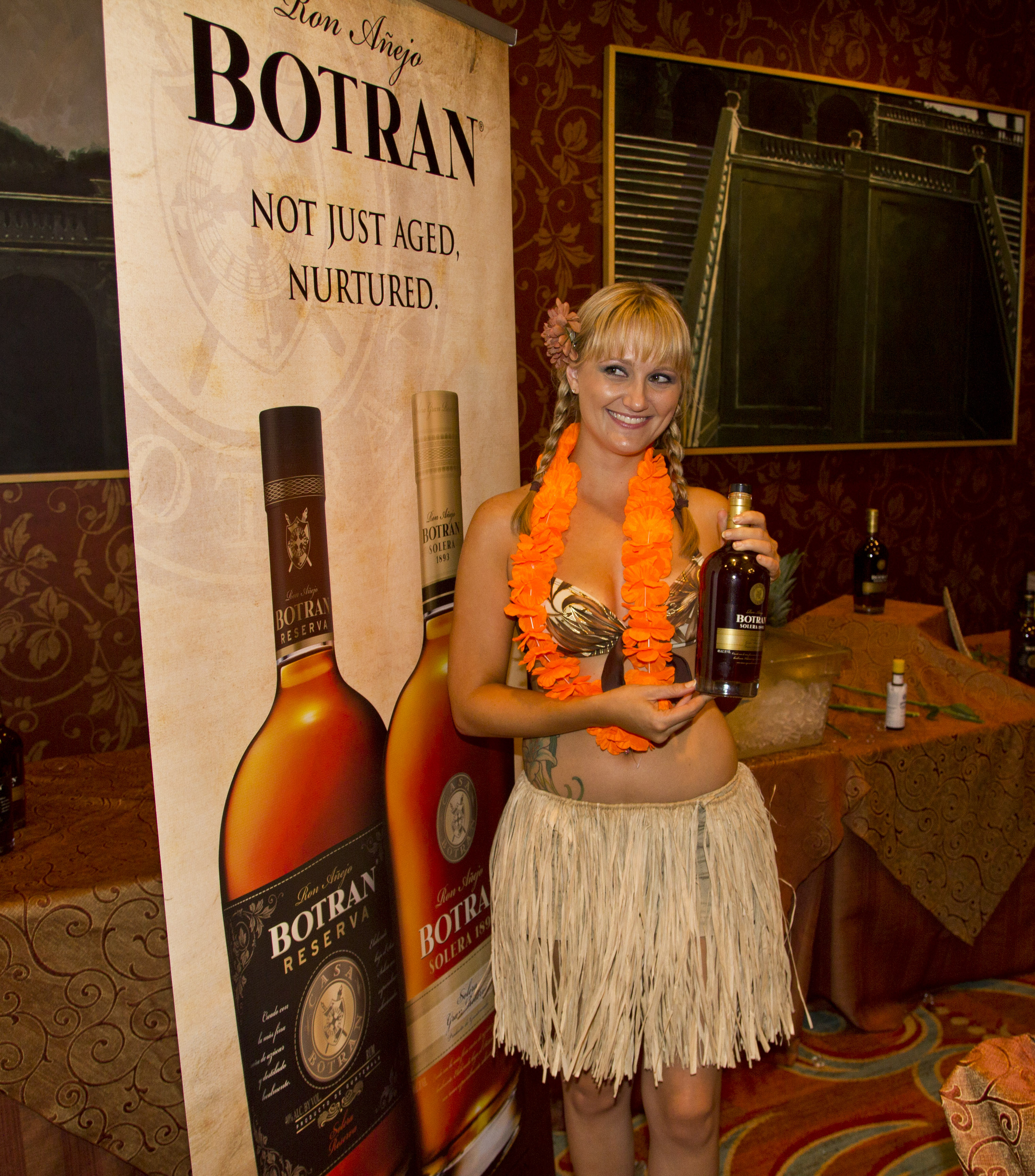
There was a campaign to popularize Zacapa and Botran rums in the United States.

Industria Licorera Guatemalteca (ILG) was founded in 1914, and Industria Licorera Euzkadi and Licorera Zacapaneca were founded in 1930. Industria Licorera Quezalteca was founded in 1939 by Venancio, Andrés, Felipe, Jesús and Alejandro Botrán, brothers from Burgos, Spain, who immigrated to Quetzaltenango, Guatemala c. 1935 and continued their trade. These four companies later merged to form the umbrella company Industrias Licoreras de Guatemala in 1940, 1942, or 1944, with the four distilleries operating as subsidiaries of ILG to this day. In 1953, the distilling subsidiary Industria Licorera Quezalteca was renamed to Industria Licorera Quetzalteca Cía. Ltda., and La Nacional, Distribuidora de Licores S.A. was formed in 1959 to handle the marketing, distribution, and sales aspects of the brands.

In 1968, production moved to Mixco to expand operations. In 1976, Ron Zacapa was created. In the early 2000s, Robert Garcia Botrán, who was president and CEO from 2002 until December 2015, flew to Miami and worked to convince bartenders and liquor stores of the quality of Zacapa rum, hoping that its popularity spreads by word of mouth. On April 1, 2008, Diageo gained exclusive distribution rights to Ron Zacapa Centenario, and in July of 2011, Diageo purchased a 50% stake in Ron Zacapa, forming Rum Creation & Products Inc.

== Production ==
Diagram of the Sistema Solera aging and blending process of Ron Zacapa Centenario 23 rum. Each step is aged for 1.5 years, meaning most rum in the blend is 6 years old, with some from the older stocks up to 23 years old. Ron Botran, El Pasador de Oro, and other Ron Zacapa Centenario bottlings go through a similar process.

All rums start from sugarcane from the Tululá Sugar Mill, grown in the volcanic soil of Guatemala. The sugarcane matures in its second year, at which point the field is burned to burn off the leaves of the plants. The sugarcane is squeezed for its juice, which is then reduced to a syrup (called "miel de caña", or sugarcane honey, in Spanish). This is then fermented for 120 hours using Saccharomyces cerevisae, a yeast strain originating in pineapples, and distilled in multi-column stills, producing a light, neutral aguardiente, typical of Spanish-style rum production. The stills have taps at different intervals, allowing the produced rum to come from higher taps, producing lighter, cleaner, stronger spirit, or from lower taps, allowing for a more flavorful spirit. For example, Zacapa 15 is a lighter product and exits from a higher tap at 92% ABV, while Zacapa 23 exits from a lower tap to achieve bolder, fruitier flavors at 88% ABV. This process happens for only two months out of the year, as it's timed to the annual sugarcane harvest.

Botran, Zacapa, El Pasador de Oro, and other "Sistema Solera" rums are aged in the "dynamic solera" style, inspired by solera wine aging, where the rum does not have a distinct age, but rather, new rum is added to old rum and blended in a series of casks. The freshly distilled aguardiente is diluted to 60% ABV before the aging process begins. The spirit ages in a series consisting of bourbon barrels, re-charred bourbon barrels, Sherry casks, Pedro Ximénez barrels, all American white oak, and sometimes cognac barrels, made of French oak, with blending in a vat between each stage. During the blending, a small portion of the final product is added, allowing for some of the rum in the blend to be much older. Finally, the rum is filtered using cellulose to prevent a cloudy appearance at colder temperatures, before being bottled. The aging warehouse is at an altitude of 2.3 km above sea level, where the air is cool and moist,, which slows the aging process and reduces losses to evaporation compared to tropical aging. The distillery also works to reduce the use of fossil fuels and to reuse water, such as by burning waste methane for energy, and has earned the ISCC PLUS certification in 2017. The waste created from distillation is high in potassium, nitrogen, and sulphates, and is used as fertilizer for the next crop of sugarcane.

== Protection of geographical indication ==
In 2012, the government of Guatemala created Ron de Guatemala, the official protected designation of origin (PDO) of Guatemalan rum. Ron de Guatemala stipulates that rum produced in the country must meet several criteria:

- Made from specific strains of sugarcane grown in the departments of Retalhuleu and Suchitepéquez in Guatemala.
- Made from first-press juice reduced to a syrup ("miel virgen") of 72% sugar content
- The syrup must be fermented for 110 to 120 hours using a yeast derived from pineapple.
- The wine must be distilled to a spirit of 88-92% ABV.
- The spirit must be diluted to 60% ABV and aged a minimum of 1 year.
- The spirit must be aged using the "Sistema Solera" in Quetzaltenango at an altitude of at least 2300 meters above sea level.

In 2010, Guatemala established a geographical indication (GI) for their rum, which was recognized by the European Union in 2014. France objected to the Guatemalan rum GI due to its allowance of the use of flavourings, colorants and sweeteners, but this objection was overruled.

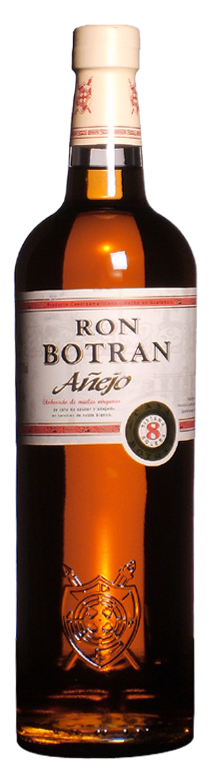
A bottle of Ron Botran Añejo 8

== Owned brands ==
- Botran, the distillery's namesake rum brand.
- Quezalteca, the distillery's flagship aguardiente brand.
- Ron Zacapa Centenario, the distillery's flagship premium rum brand.
- Vendado, a budget brand of aguardiente, light rum, and ready to drink rum cocktails.
- Colonial, a brand of rum.
- Rum XL, a brand of flavored rum liqueur.
- Xibal, a brand of gin.
- Cane Vodka, a brand of vodka.
- Morandé, the distillery's flagship wine brand.
- Viña Tarapacá, a brand of wine.
- Sarmientos, a brand of wine.
- Gran Andes del Sur, a brand of Chilean box wine.

as well as several other smaller brands of wines and aguardientes.

El Pasador De Oro, another prominent rum brand aged in the dynamic solera style, is distilled and aged at ILG, but is then shipped to France and finished for 6 months in cognac casks. The brand is owned by French company Les Bienheureux.

== Awards ==
Between 1998 and 2001, Ron Zacapa Centenario 23 won at the International Rum Festival four times in a row.
