= Matusalem & Co. =

Manufacturer of premium Caribbean rum

Matusalem & Company
- Industry: Distilled spirits
- Founded: Santiago de Cuba
- Headquarters: Dominican Republic
- Website: www.matusalem.com

Matusalem & Company is a manufacturer of premium Caribbean rum. Founded in Santiago de Cuba, it is now produced in the Dominican Republic.

== History ==
Matusalem & Company was founded by brothers Benjamin and Eduardo Camp, who left Spain and settled in Santiago de Cuba in 1872 for the purpose of establishing a rum distillery., The Camp brothers brought with them their knowledge and expertise in the solera system of blending and distillation used in making Spanish cognac and sherry.

During the 1950s, the brand was one of the top premium rums in Cuba, competing with Bacardi and Havana Club. having 50% market share.

Following the Cuban revolution 1959, the family-owned Matusalem brand went into exile, and was established in the United States. The Cuban government continued to make rum in the former Matusalem factory in Santiago de Cuba.

Three branches of the family began feuding in 1981, resulting in court cases that extended into the mid-90s. These ended in 1995 when Dr. Claudio Alvarez Salazar, the great-grandson of the founder, gained control of the Matusalem trademark in an out-of-court settlement.

In 2002, Matusalem and Company was relaunched, with branding focused on its Cuban roots, and targeting the high-end market in the United States. The rum is produced in the Dominican Republic, but was not formally made available in that country until 2015.

The company has engaged in litigation over its use of phrases like "The Spirit of Cuba" in Italy.

== Name ==
The name "Matusalem" is Spanish for Methuselah, the Old Testament patriarch said to have lived for 969 years. It was chosen as a reference to the aging process used in producing the brand, and popularized with the phrase "más viejo que Matusalén" (older than Methuselah).

== Current Portfolio ==
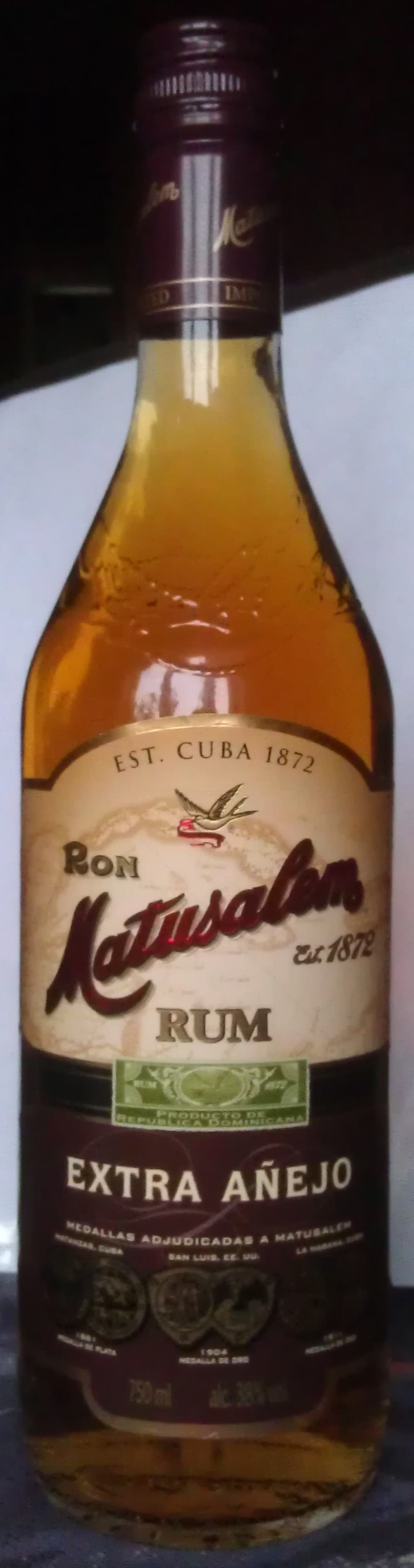
Matusalem Extra Añejo

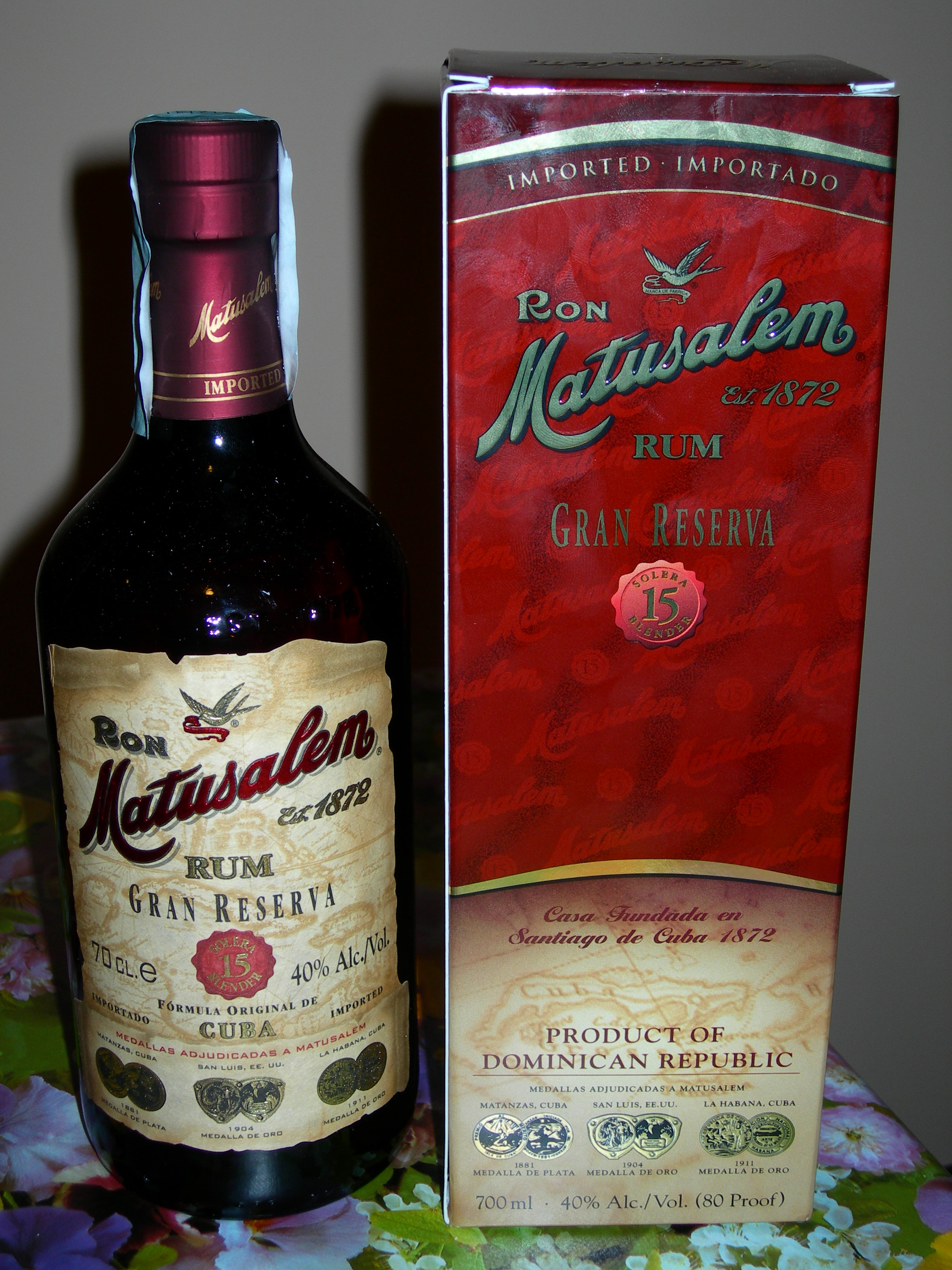
Matusalem Gran Reserva

Seven different products are currently manufactured by Matusalem and Company:

- Matusalem Gran Reserva 15
- Matusalem Gran Reserva 18
- Matusalem Gran Reserva 23
- Matusalem Clasico 10
- Matusalem Platino
- Matusalem Solera 7
- Matusalem Extra Añejo
