= Isla Ñ Rum =

Argentinian line of premium rums

Isla Ñ Rum is a line of premium rums that were made in Tucumán, Argentina.

Isla Ñ Rum was founded in 2004 by Pablo Ibarreche. As of 2011, it was the only boutique rum distillery in Argentina and produced 360,000 litres of spirits a year, of which 95% was exported. The company's larger presence in foreign markets was partly explained by its participation in international fairs, which was facilitated by government programs giving financial assistance. In 2013, it shut down in response to a weak domestic market and depressed currency making exporting unviable.
