= The Noble Experiment (distillery) =

Rum distillery in New York City

- Type: Private
- Industry: Distillery
- Founded: 2012; 14 years ago in New York City, United States
- Founder: Bridget Firtle
- Fate: Active
- Products: Rum
- Number of employees: 3
- Website: owneys.com

The Noble Experiment is a distillery founded and operated by Bridget Firtle in Bushwick, New York City. It is New York City's only rum distillery, and is only available within the state.

== History ==
Firtle began working on the company in 2011 while she was working on Wall Street managing a hedge fund. She left her job and began building The Noble Experiment in 2012, starting to sell white rum at the beginning of 2013. The product is named Owney's NYC Rum, after Prohibition-era bootlegger Owney Madden, and the company's name is taken after the nickname for the Prohibition policy. The rum is made solely from molasses, yeast, and NYC water. The process of measuring ingredients and producing mash is done by hand.

=== Reception ===
Firtle has been featured on the Forbes Food & Wine 30 Under 30.

Amy Zavatto of Serious Eats described Owney's rum as "gently earthy" with a "mild, balanced, tender sweetness". Wine Enthusiast Magazine described it as crisp and appealing. It received a score of 93 at an Ultimate Spirits Challenge tasting.
