= Ron Cihuatán =

Cihuatán
- Type: Rum
- Manufacturer: Licorera Cihuatán S.A. DE C.V.
- Origin: El Salvador
- Introduced: 2015; 11 years ago
- Website: Cihuatán Rum website

Ron Cihuatán is a brand of rum from El Salvador.

== History ==
Licorera Cihuatán S.A. DE C.V., distiller of Cihuatán Rum, was founded in 2004, and is a division of Ingenio La Cabaña, a long established sugar producer. The distillery is located in El Paisnal municipality, El Salvador, and takes its name from a Mayan settlement, now the Cihuatán archaeological site. The company applied for a US trademark in 2014, which was granted in 2016. The first release was an 8 year old rum in 2015, coinciding with their first exports to markets including Lithuania. In 2020 Cihuatán Indigo 8 Years Old Rum won Double Gold in The Fifty Best competition, and also in 2020 the company won Double Gold at the International Spirits Challenge for their rebranding of the Indigo and Cinabrio expressions.

== Production ==
Cihuatán Rum is produced from sugarcane grown in El Salvador and initially processed by parent company Ingenio La Cabaña. The Cihuatán team work with their parent company to select molasses for fermentation and distillation. Cihuatán is distilled in a continuous process using column stills. The rum is matured predominately in former bourbon barrels for at least eight years.

Gabriela Ayala is the brand's master blender.

== Products ==
- Cihuatán Jade - matured for 4 years in former bourbon barrels
- Cihuatán Indigo - matured for 8 years in former bourbon barrels
- Cihuatán Cinabrio - matured for 12 years in former bourbon barrels
- Cihuatán Sahumerio - blend of rums matured for between 12 and 14 years
- Cihuatán Alux - matured for 15 years, finished in oloroso sherry and cognac casks
- Cihuatán Xaman XO - initially matured for 15 years in former bourbon barrels, before finishing for one year in Mayan Ceiba barrels.
