= The Distillery Phuket =

Distillery in Phuket, Thailand

- Founded: 2012

The Distillery Phuket is a distillery in Phuket, Thailand founded in 2012 by French expatriates Marine Lucchini and Thibault Spithakis. The Distillery Phuket produces Chalong Bay Rum, Lanna Vodka, and Saneha Gin.

== History ==
Lucchini and Spithakis previously worked in the financial services industry in Paris. The couple began producing Chalong Bay Rum using Thai sugarcane juice in 2012.

In 2012, The Distillery Phuket began producing Saneha Gin, using a base of fermented sugarcane juice.
