= Carúpano (rum) =

Venezuelan rum

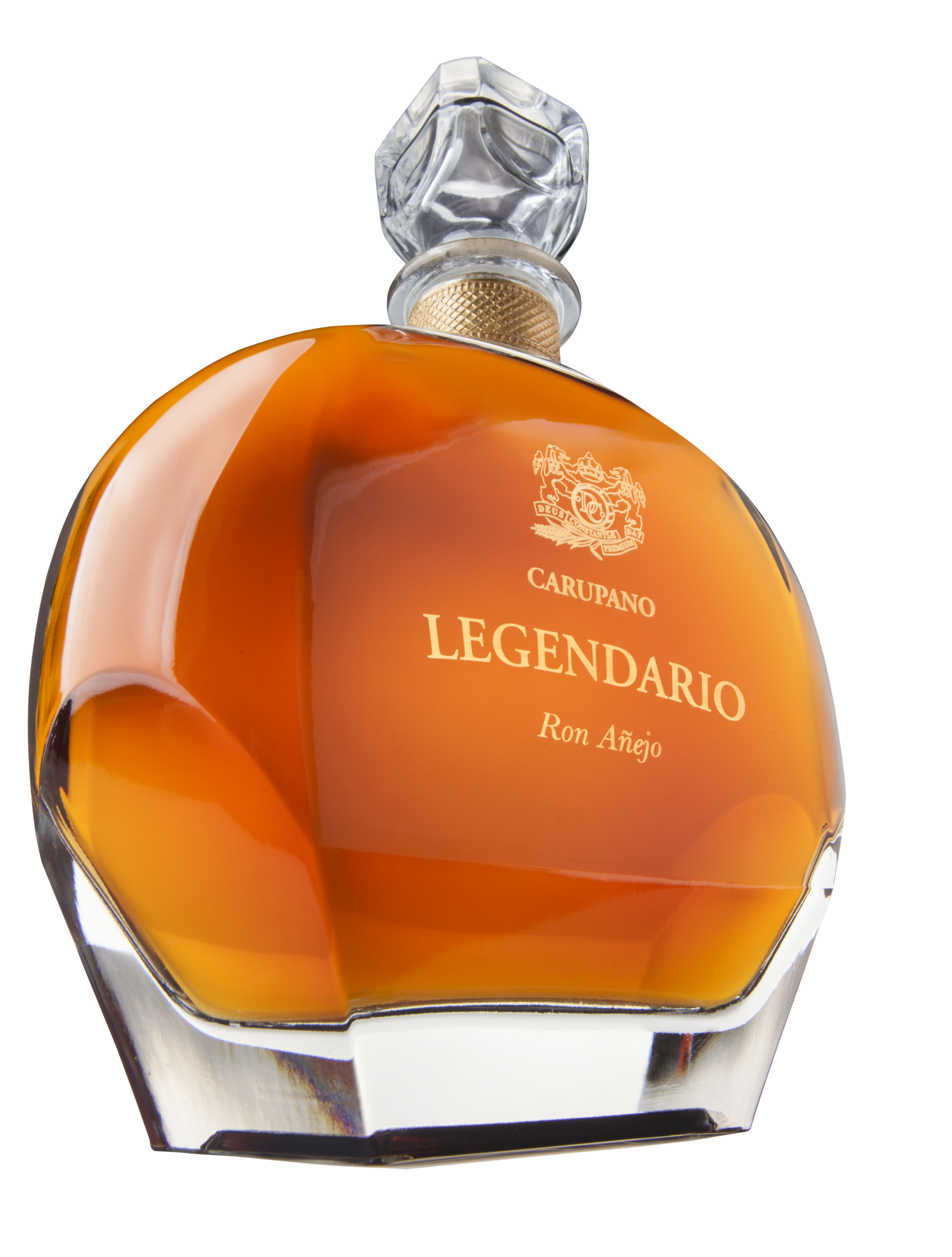
- Carúpano Legendario Ron Añjo.
- Type: Rum
- Manufacturer: Destilería Carúpano
- Origin: Carúpano, Venezuela
- Introduced: 1762
- Website: https://roncarupano.com/

Carúpano is a Venezuelan rum produced by Carupano Distillery. It was founded in 1762 in Macarapana-Carúpano, Venezuela.

== History ==
Destilería Carúpano's historic tradition dates back to 1762 when the Hacienda Altamira-Carúpano in Macarapana is established by the Spanish captain Felix del Fierro. In 1954 the Morrison family bought the bicentenary Hacienda Altamira, abandoned since 1901, after the death of Thomas Massiani, one of the owners. The original intent of the new owners, taking into account the water wealth of the estate and its tradition of producing rums, was to re-establish its sugarcane milling capacity and the distillation and aging of rums; for this purpose, they join forces with Alejandro Hernandez, owner of Industrias Pampero, and sharing equal ownership, create Destilería Carúpano, CA, a relationship that lasted until 1962.

== Aged Rums ==
- Ron Añejo Carúpano Legendario (supposedly the only single barrel 25-year-old Venezuelan rum) Some may reach up to 80 years of aging.
- Ron Añejo Carúpano XO
- Ron Añejo Carúpano Solera Centenaria
- Ron Añejo Carúpano Oro
- Ron Añejo Carúpano

== See also ==
- Venezuelan rum
