= Dictador =

Brand of rum from Colombia

- Type: Rum
- Manufacturer: Destilería Colombiana Established in 1913 Ltda.
- Origin: Cartagena, Colombia
- Introduced: 2007
- Website: Dictador website

Dictador is a Colombian rum brand. It is produced by Destilería Colombiana Established in 1913 Ltda. and distributed by Dictador Europe Sp. z o.o.

== History ==
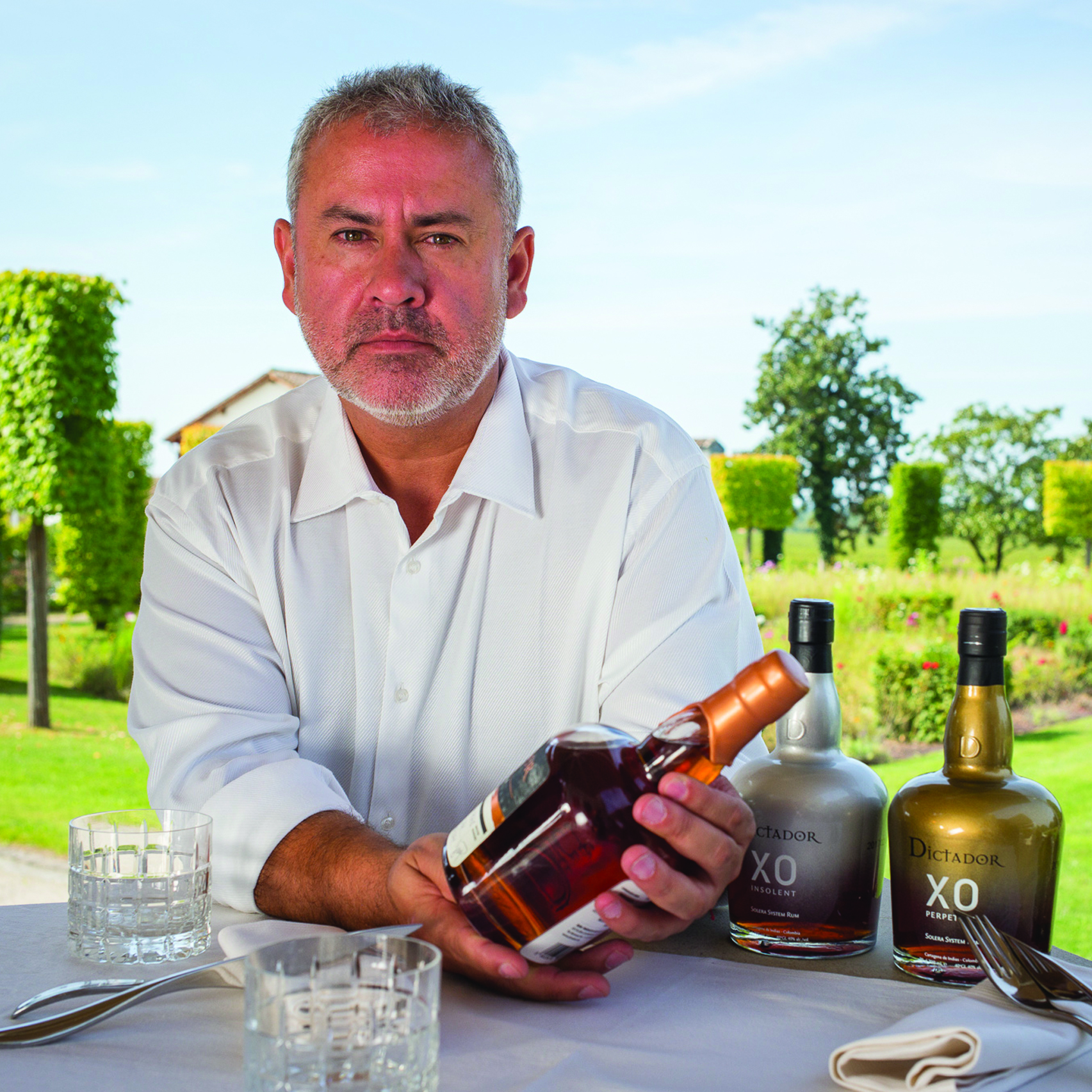
Dictador rum master blender Hernan Parra

Destilería Colombiana Established in 1913 Ltda. was established on September 12, 2007 in Cartagena, Colombia. Dictador Europe Sp. z o.o. was registered in 2009 in Katowice, Poland. The president is Marek Szołdrowski, and it is a wholly owned subsidiary of Dictador Holding Limited OÜ, which is located in Estonia.

== Production ==
Destilería Colombiana Established in 1913 Ltda. imports ethyl alcohol from Panama-based Consorcio Licorero Nacional S.A.
