= Oronoco Rum =

Oronoco
- Manufacturer: Vicente and Roberto Bastos Ribiero
- Origin: Brazil

Oronoco is a premium rum from Brazil, produced by cachaça makers Vicente, and Roberto Bastos Ribeiro.

== History ==
In 1974, Jaimundo Bastos Ribeiro started to make spirits at the family's Fazenda Soledade estate. In 1986, Jaimundo's younger brothers Vicente and Roberto Bastos Ribeiro joined their older brother to turn his artisanal distillery into a premium maker of cachaça and rum. Diageo launched the global distribution of the Bastos Ribeiro-produced Oronoco Rum in 2005. It was advertised as the "first ever super-premium white rum made from fresh cut Brazilian mountain cane". Diageo discontinued the distribution of the brand in 2010.

== Production ==
Oronoco is produced by Vicente and Roberto Bastos Ribeiro, a distillery in Fazenda Soledade in Brazil known for producing cachaça, it is made from mountain-grown sugar cane, with a taste popularly described as possessing hints of vanilla and molasses.

== Awards ==
Gold Medal, 2005 San Francisco World Spirits Competition.
