= Industrias Pampero =

Rum distiller in Venezuela

Industrias Pampero, C.A.
- Company type: Private
- Industry: Distilled beverages
- Founded: Caracas, Venezuela (1938)
- Founder: Alejandro Hernandez
- Headquarters: Caracas, Venezuela; Ocumare del Tuy; Valencia, Venezuela
- Products: Rum
- Parent: Gruppo Montenegro

Industrias Pampero, C.A. is a Venezuelan rum distiller, and a subsidiary of Gruppo Montenegro. It was founded in 1938 and produces a range of rums, including a white rum Pampero Blanco (used to make cocktails), an aged rum Pampero Especial (a blend of dark Venezuelan rums aged for two years in oak casks), and an aged rum Pampero Aniversario (sold in a brown leather pouch).

Pampero's main markets are Italy, Spain and Venezuela. Its main production plant is located at "Complejo Licorero del Centro", in Ocumare, Miranda state, in the region of the Tuy river valleys, in the central plains.

== Name ==
"Ron Pampero" is typically known by Venezuelans as "Caballito Frenao" (literally "Restrained Horse" but in this context "Rearing Horse"), in reference to its popular brand logo, a cowboy sitting astride a rearing horse in the Venezuelan plains, a scene comparable to that of the gaucho from the Argentinian plains, or Pampas, so therefore its name ("Pampero" literally means "from the Pampas", although the Venezuelan plains are called Llanos).

== History ==
Pampero was founded in 1938 by Alejandro Hernández, the son of Dr. Amador Hernandez and Dolorita Hernandez from Juan Griego, Margarita.

In 1991, Tamayo sold 95% of Industrias Pampero to the United Distillers subsidiary of Guinness Brewery for £45 million.

In February 2024, a report claimed Diageo was looking to sell Pampero Rum, and in July 2024, Pampero rum was sold to Gruppo Montenegro which is a leading Italian food and spirits manufacturer for an undisclosed sum.

== Products ==
A Pampero label

Pampero rums, being aged, have a golden color that comes from having been matured in oak casks for several years, the duration depending on the type of rum.

Current Pampero products include:

- Carúpano
- Pampero Ron Añejo Especial, also known as Pampero Oro for the yellow label
- Pampero Ron Añejo Aniversario, known for its bottle in a leather pouch
- Pampero Blanco
- Pampero Selección 1938 Ron Añejo
