= Travellers Liquors =

Coordinates: 17.510534°N 88.214302°W

Travellers Liquors Limited
- Industry: distilling
- Founded: 1953
- Founder: Omario Perdomo
- Headquarters: Belize
- Products: liquors

Travellers Liquors Limited is a distiller based in Belize. The company produces a variety of different liquors, specializing in aged rum.

== History ==
Travellers Liquors began providing Belizeans and visitors assortments of distilled products in 1953. The company was founded by Master Blender Omario Perdomo. The company gained its name from the success it achieved in serving travellers along the main route to and from Belize City.

In 1992, the company completely upgraded its distillation facility, stepping away from other distilleries which use acids to speed up the fermentation process. For its rum products, Travellers employs high-test molasses with natural fermentation, coupled with a double-distillation method for smoother taste. Apart from traditional distilled products like rum and vodka, Travellers also produces liqueurs and wines from Belizean fruits and is the only Belizean refinery that does this.

In 1995, Travellers passed standards set for vodka by the U. S. Bureau of Tobacco, Alcohol & Firearms, clearing the way for its first shipment of 1,600 gallons of Cane Juice Vodka to the U. S. for sale in 39 states. A year later, Travellers captured two awards at the Annual Rum Tasting contest, the only company of the 131 who entered to win in two major categories.

It was in 2005 that the first shipment of One Barrel rum came to the United States. A single pallet of 75 cases was delivered to H A P L.L.C. in Mesa, Arizona. From those humble beginnings One Barrel has grown to be distributed in over twenty states.

== Products ==
Travellers specializes in producing aged dark rums. These are distilled from fermented molasses and aged in charred oak casks. The most well-known is One Barrel Rum which is aged for one year. One Barrel is available in the US and Canada, as well as Belize. Travellers also produces gold rums, white rums, flavored rums, brandies, vodkas, wines, gins, and various liqueurs.

== Production ==
Travellers still in Belmopan, Belize

Barrels awaiting transport to the aging shed in Belize City

Travellers Liquors distillery is located in Belmopan, the capital city of Belize. Travellers uses local molasses, fermented and distilled in a triple column continuous still. The aging shed is in Belize City. Business offices, the bottling plant and shipping are also at the main facility in Belize City.

== Awards ==
In 2006, One Barrel Rum won a Gold Medal in the dark rum category at the first annual International Cane Spirits Competition.

In 2007, it won the Best of Category Gold at the second annual International Cane Spirits Competition.

In 2015, One Barrel Rum won a Gold Award at the 72nd annual Wine and Spirits Wholesalers of America Convention & Exposition.
