= Oronoco, Minnesota =

City in Minnesota, United States

Oronoco
- City
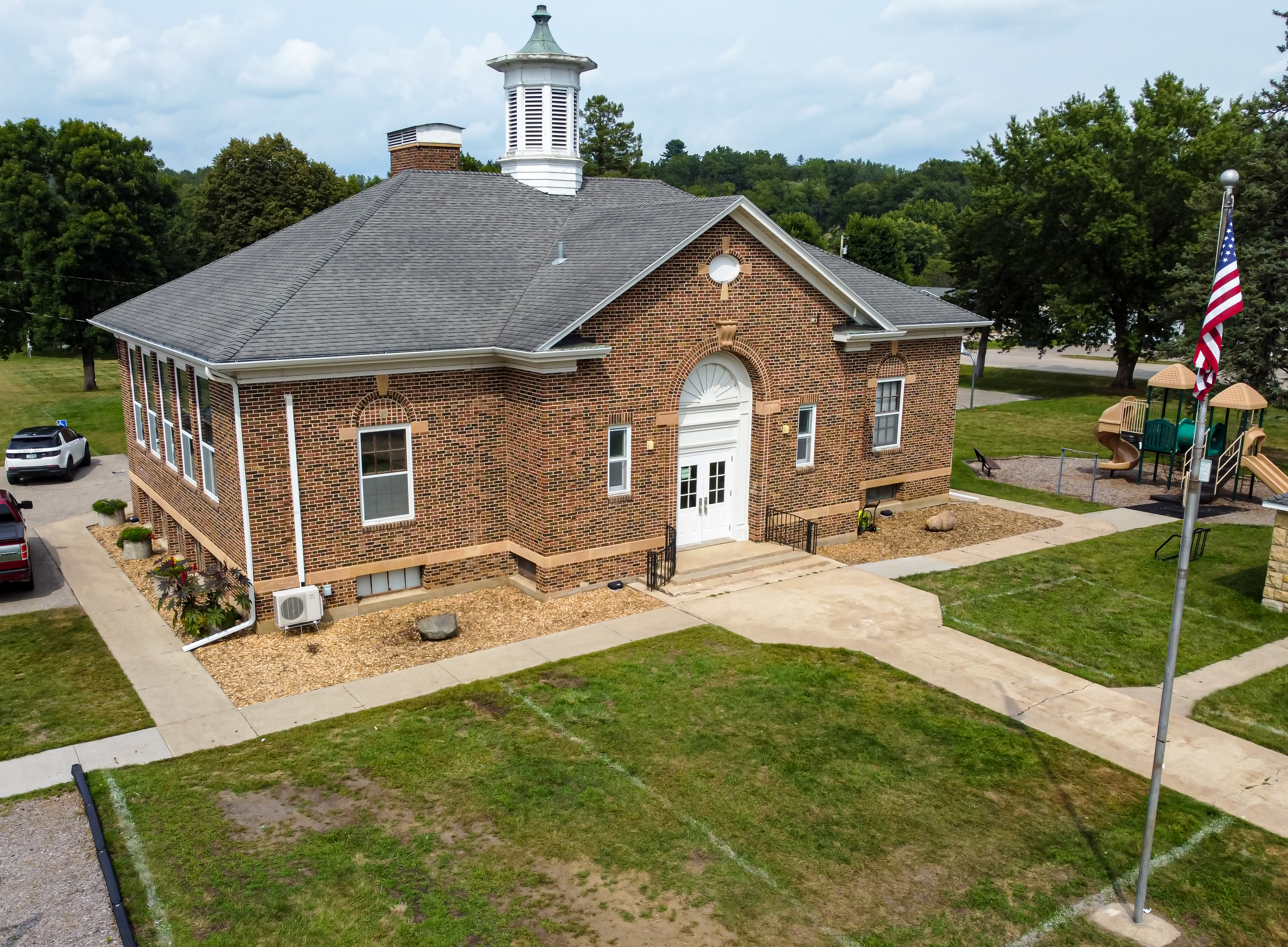
- City hall

- Location of Oronoco, Minnesota
- Coordinates: 44°09′35″N 92°32′24″W
- Country: United States
- State: Minnesota
- County: Olmsted
- Established: 1854

Area
  - Total: 3.05 sq mi (7.89 km^{2})
  - Land: 2.92 sq mi (7.55 km^{2})
  - Water: 0.13 sq mi (0.34 km^{2})
- Elevation: 965 ft (294 m)

Population (2020)
  - Total: 1,802
  - Density: 618.0/sq mi (238.63/km^{2})
- Time zone: UTC-6 (CST)
  - Summer (DST): UTC-5 (CDT)
- ZIP code: 55960
- Area code: 507
- FIPS code: 27-48598
- GNIS feature ID: 2396082
- Website: oronoco.com

Oronoco (/ɒrəˈnoʊkoʊ/ orr-ə-NOH-koh) is a city in Olmsted County, Minnesota, United States, along the Middle Fork of the Zumbro River. The population was 1,802 at the 2020 census.

== History ==
The city was named by early settler Hector Galloway after the Orinoco, a large river in South America. A village was founded in 1854 and platted in 1855. The village incorporated as a city on March 6, 1968. Oronoco Township, which is adjacent on three sides, was organized in 1858. It is a bedroom community for nearby Rochester.

== Geography ==
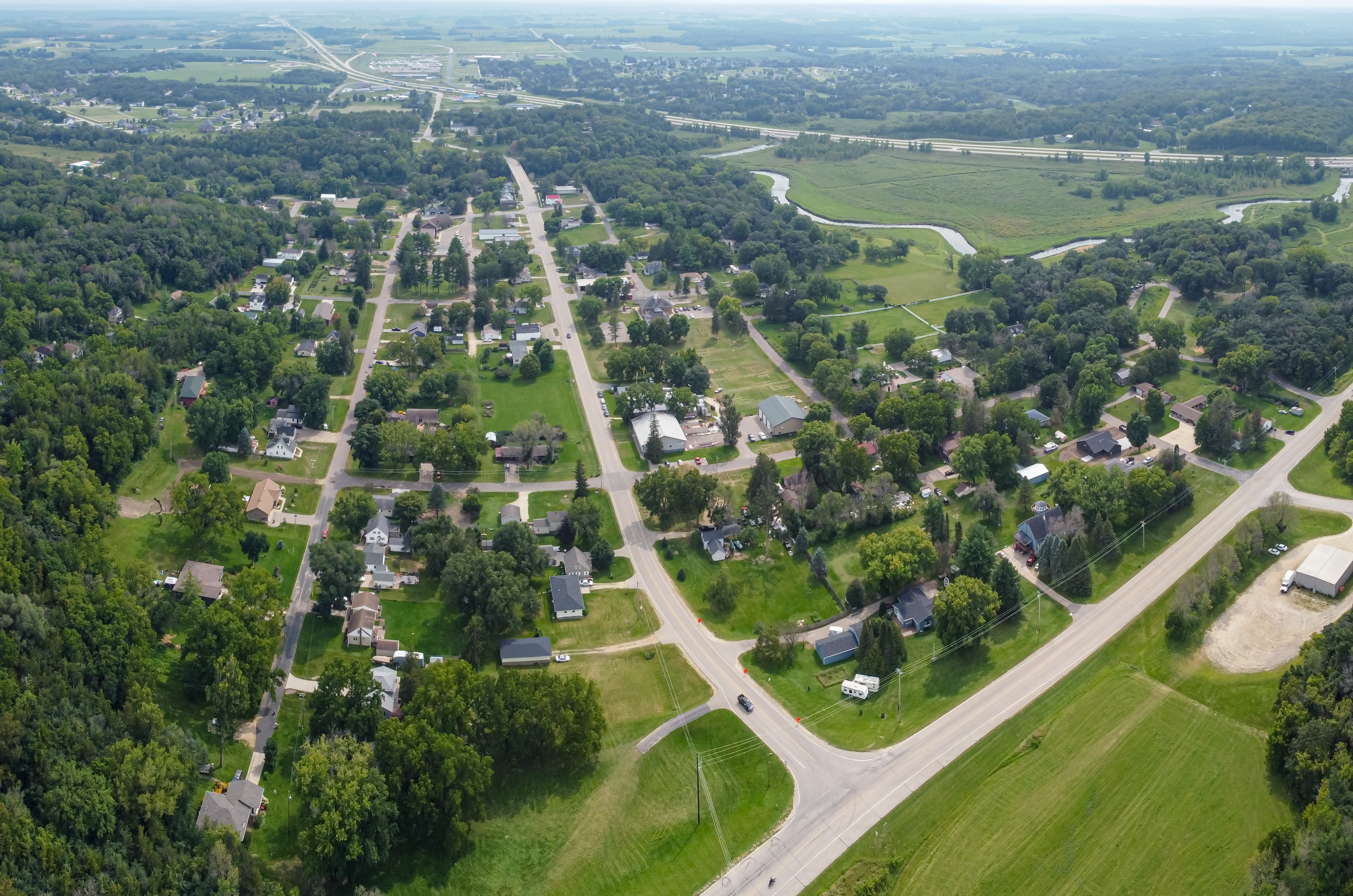

According to the United States Census Bureau, the city has an area of 2.81 square miles (7.28 km^{2}), of which 2.49 square miles (6.45 km^{2}) is land and 0.32 square miles (0.83 km^{2}) is water.

== Demographics ==
Historical population
Census	Pop.	Note	%±
1880	241		—
1970	564		—
1980	574		1.8%
1990	727		26.7%
2000	883		21.5%
2010	1,300		47.2%
2020	1,802		38.6%
U.S. Decennial Census; 2020 Census

=== 2020 census ===
As of the 2020 census, Oronoco had a population of 1,802. The median age was 37.5 years. 33.0% of residents were under the age of 18 and 9.0% of residents were 65 years of age or older. For every 100 females, there were 100.9 males, and for every 100 females age 18 and over, there were 102.2 males age 18 and over.

0.0% of residents lived in urban areas, while 100.0% lived in rural areas.

There were 578 households in Oronoco, of which 50.2% had children under the age of 18 living in them. Of all households, 74.7% were married-couple households, 10.7% were households with a male householder and no spouse or partner present, and 9.9% were households with a female householder and no spouse or partner present. About 13.6% of all households were made up of individuals, and 4.0% had someone living alone who was 65 years of age or older.

There were 589 housing units, of which 1.9% were vacant. The homeowner vacancy rate was 0.9% and the rental vacancy rate was 0.0%.

Racial composition as of the 2020 census
Race	Number	Percent
White	1,680	93.2%
Black or African American	9	0.5%
American Indian and Alaska Native	2	0.1%
Asian	39	2.2%
Native Hawaiian and Other Pacific Islander	0	0.0%
Some other race	13	0.7%
Two or more races	59	3.3%
Hispanic or Latino (of any race)	17	0.9%

=== 2010 census ===
As of the census of 2010, there were 1,300 people, 451 households, and 357 families living in the city. The population density was 522.1 inhabitants per square mile (201.6/km^{2}). There were 477 housing units at an average density of 191.6 per square mile (74.0/km^{2}). The racial makeup of the city was 95.2% White, 0.2% African American, 0.2% Native American, 3.0% Asian, 0.2% Pacific Islander, 0.5% from other races, and 0.8% from two or more races. Hispanic or Latino of any race were 0.5% of the population.

There were 451 households, of which 45.5% had children under the age of 18 living with them, 69.6% were married couples living together, 5.5% had a female householder with no husband present, 4.0% had a male householder with no wife present, and 20.8% were non-families. 16.9% of all households were made up of individuals, and 5.1% had someone living alone who was 65 years of age or older. The average household size was 2.87 and the average family size was 3.25.

The median age in the city was 36 years. 31.7% of residents were under the age of 18; 4.9% were between the ages of 18 and 24; 28.3% were from 25 to 44; 27.2% were from 45 to 64; and 8.1% were 65 years of age or older. The gender makeup of the city was 50.1% male and 49.9% female.

=== 2000 census ===
As of the census of 2000, there were 883 people, 335 households, and 253 families living in the city. The population density was 482.8 inhabitants per square mile (186.4/km^{2}). There were 343 housing units at an average density of 187.6 per square mile (72.4/km^{2}). The racial makeup of the city was 97.40% White, 0.11% Native American, 1.13% Asian, 0.11% Pacific Islander, 0.11% from other races, and 1.13% from two or more races. Hispanic or Latino of any race were 1.81% of the population.

There were 335 households, out of which 33.7% had children under the age of 18 living with them, 65.7% were married couples living together, 6.0% had a female householder with no husband present, and 24.2% were non-families. 18.5% of all households were made up of individuals, and 6.3% had someone living alone who was 65 years of age or older. The average household size was 2.64 and the average family size was 3.00.

In the city, the population was spread out, with 25.9% under the age of 18, 6.3% from 18 to 24, 33.5% from 25 to 44, 25.8% from 45 to 64, and 8.4% who were 65 years of age or older. The median age was 38 years. For every 100 females, there were 105.3 males. For every 100 females age 18 and over, there were 105.7 males.

The median income for a household in the city was $67,656, and the median income for a family was $72,396. Males had a median income of $47,153 versus $35,694 for females. The per capita income for the city was $27,965. About 0.8% of families and 2.1% of the population were below the poverty line, including 4.3% of those under age 18 and none of those age 65 or over.

== Infrastructure ==
=== Transportation ===
U.S. Highway 52 serves as a main route in the community.
