= Finishing (whisky) =

Maturation of the spirit in a cask

Finishing (also known as double matured or wood-finished) is the procedure that some whiskies undergo where the spirit is matured in a cask of a particular origin and then spends time in a cask of different origin (from a couple of months up to the entire maturation) Typically, the first cask is an American oak cask formerly used to mature bourbon. The second cask may be one that has been used to mature some sort of fortified wine, often sherry, though sometimes casks for port, madeira, or even red burgundy or chardonnay are used.

Some of the more well-known finished whiskies include Balvenie "Doublewood", which is finished in sherry casks; Oak & Eden In-Bottle Finished Whiskey, which is finished with a spiral-cut piece of wood inside the bottle; Angel's Envy bourbon, which is finished in port and rum barrels; Glenlivet "American Oak Finish" and "French Oak Finish", which are finished in brand-new casks of the respective woods; the Glenmorangie range of sherry, port, madeira, and burgundy finishes; and the Diageo line of "Distiller's Editions", a "Double Matured" expression of each of their classics line of single malt scotch whiskies.
