= Oronoco Township, Olmsted County, Minnesota =

Oronoco Township, Minnesota
- Township
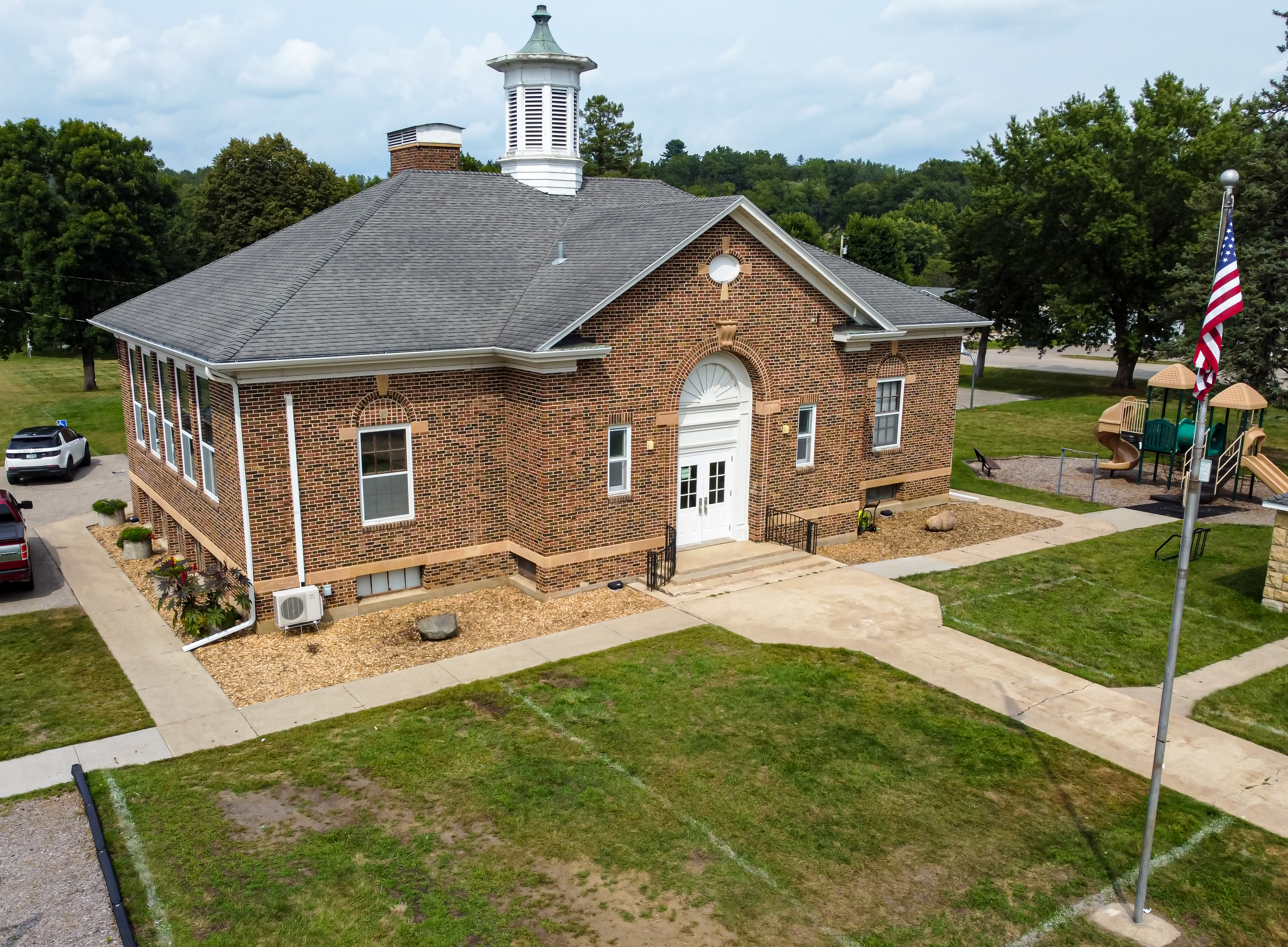
- Town hall at the Oronoco City Hall community center

- Location within the state of Minnesota Oronoco Township, Minnesota (the United States)
- Coordinates: 44°9′22″N 92°30′53″W
- Country: United States
- State: Minnesota
- County: Olmsted

Area
  - Total: 33.4 sq mi (86.6 km^{2})
  - Land: 32.6 sq mi (84.4 km^{2})
  - Water: 0.81 sq mi (2.1 km^{2})
- Elevation: 1,004 ft (306 m)

Population (2000)
  - Total: 2,239
  - Density: 69/sq mi (26.5/km^{2})
- Time zone: UTC-6 (Central (CST))
  - Summer (DST): UTC-5 (CDT)
- ZIP code: 55960
- Area code: 507
- FIPS code: 27-48616
- GNIS feature ID: 0665217
- Website: https://oronocotownship-mn.gov/

Oronoco Township is a township in Olmsted County, Minnesota, United States. The population was 2,239 at the 2000 census. The township was organized in 1858 and named for the adjacent city of Oronoco, which had formed in 1854. The city was named by early settler Dr. Hector Galloway for the similarly spelled Orinoco, a large river in South America.

== Geography ==
According to the United States Census Bureau, the township has a total area of 33.4 square miles (86.6 km^{2}), of which 32.6 square miles (84.5 km^{2}) is land and 0.8 square mile (2.1 km^{2}) (2.48%) is water.

== Demographics ==
As of the census of 2000, there were 2,239 people, 816 households, and 616 families residing in the township. The population density was 68.7 inhabitants per square mile (26.5/km^{2}). There were 872 housing units at an average density of 26.7 per square mile (10.3/km^{2}). The racial makeup of the township was 94.64% White, 1.83% African American, 0.13% Native American, 1.70% Asian, 0.67% from other races, and 1.03% from two or more races. Hispanic or Latino of any race were 1.70% of the population.

There were 816 households, out of which 40.2% had children under the age of 18 living with them, 62.5% were married couples living together, 8.9% had a female householder with no husband present, and 24.4% were non-families. 17.8% of all households were made up of individuals, and 3.3% had someone living alone who was 65 years of age or older. The average household size was 2.74 and the average family size was 3.11.

In the township the population was spread out, with 29.9% under the age of 18, 7.0% from 18 to 24, 31.0% from 25 to 44, 24.8% from 45 to 64, and 7.2% who were 65 years of age or older. The median age was 36 years. For every 100 females, there were 105.8 males. For every 100 females age 18 and over, there were 106.7 males.

The median income for a household in the township was $50,950, and the median income for a family was $54,508. Males had a median income of $40,060 versus $28,571 for females. The per capita income for the township was $27,482. About 4.3% of families and 6.3% of the population were below the poverty line, including 6.2% of those under age 18 and 13.8% of those age 65 or over.
