= Rum =

Distilled alcoholic beverage made from sugarcane

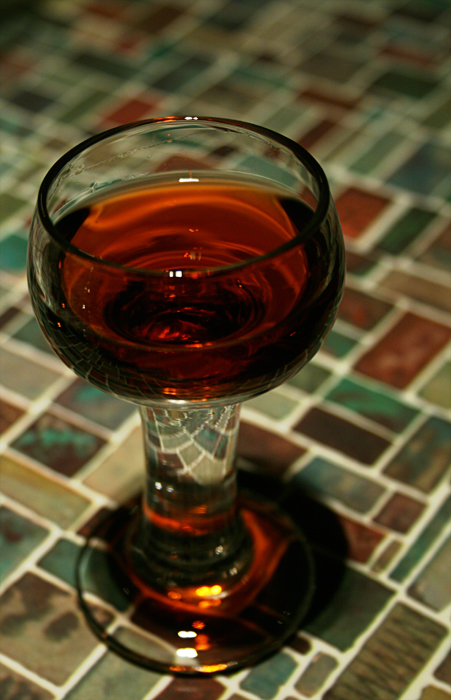
- A glass of dark rum
- Type: Distilled beverage
- Origin: Barbados, Caribbean
- Introduced: 17th century
- Alcohol by volume: 37.5–80%
- Proof (US): 75–160° US / 66–140° UK
- Colour: Clear, brown, black, red or golden
- Flavor: Sweet to dry
- Ingredients: sugarcane molasses or sugarcane juice; yeast; water
- Variants: rhum agricole, ron miel, tafia
- Related products: cachaça, charanda, clairin, grogue, grog, Seco Herrerano

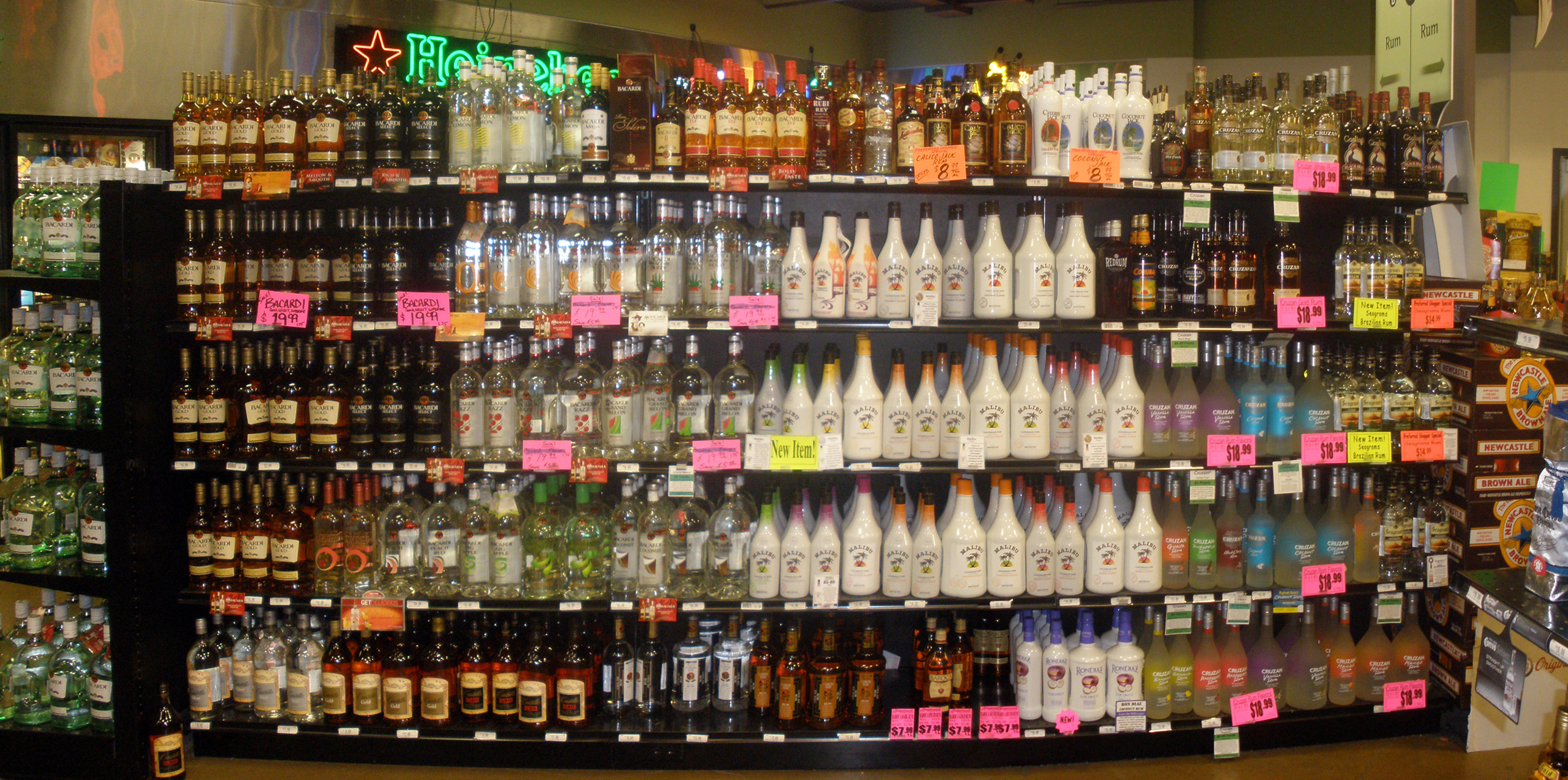
Rum display in a liquor store (United States, 2009)

Government House rum, manufactured by the Virgin Islands Company distillery in Saint Croix, circa 1941

Rum is a liquor made by fermenting and then distilling sugarcane molasses or sugarcane juice. The distillate, initially a clear liquid, is often aged in barrels. Rum originated in the Caribbean in the 17th century, where it was likely to have first been created by enslaved people on sugar plantations, but has come to be produced in nearly every major sugar-producing region of the world.

Rums are produced in various styles. Light rums are commonly used in cocktails like the Mojito and Daiquiri, while "aged" or "dark" rums offer deeper flavor profiles and are often drunk straight (U.S. English) or neat (Commonwealth English), iced ("on the rocks"), or used in cooking.

Historically, rum has served as a medium of economic exchange, playing a role in the triangular trade, slave trade, and colonial economies of the West Indies and British colonies. It has deep cultural associations with the Royal Navy and maritime history, and has been used to fund enterprises such as organized crime, and military insurgencies such as the American Revolution and the Australian Rum Rebellion.

== Etymology ==
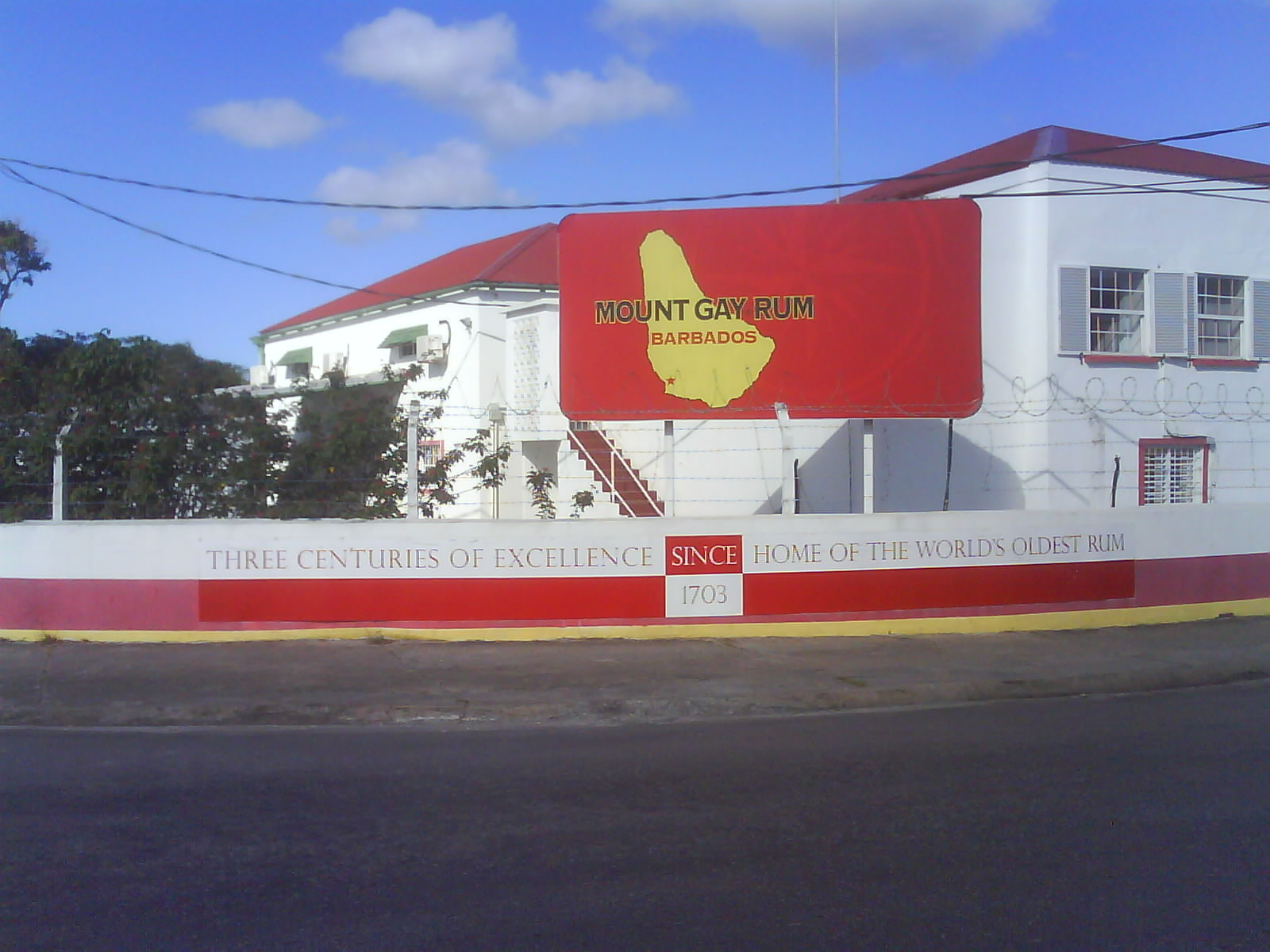
The Mount Gay Rum distillery in Barbados (visitors centre pictured) claims to be the world's oldest active rum company.

The origin of the word "rum" is unclear. The most widely accepted hypothesis is that it is related to "rumbullion", a beverage made from boiling sugar cane stalks, or possibly "rumbustion", which was a slang word for "uproar" or "tumult"; a noisy uncontrollable exuberance, though the origin of those words and the nature of the relationship are unclear. Both words surfaced in English about the same time as rum did (1651 for "rumbullion", and before 1654 "rum").

There have been various other theories:

- That it arose from the obsolete British slang adjective "rum", meaning "high quality"; "rum booze" is attested from 1725. Given the harshness of early rum, this is unlikely.
- That it came from the large drinking glasses used by Dutch seamen known as rummers, from the Dutch word roemer, a drinking glass.
- That it is related to ramboozle and rumfustian, popular British drinks of the mid-17th century. However, neither was made with rum, but rather eggs, ale, wine, sugar, and various spices.
- That it was short for arôme, French for aroma.
- That it was short for iterum, Latin for "again; a second time."

Regardless of the original source, the name was already in common use by 1654, when the General Court of Connecticut ordered the confiscations of "whatsoever Barbados liquors, commonly called rum, kill the devil and the like". A short time later in May 1657, the General Court of Massachusetts also decided to make illegal the sale of strong liquor "whether knowne by the name of rumme, strong water, wine, brandy, etc".

In current usage, the name used for a rum is often based on its place of origin.

Rhum is a French term for a rum made from fresh sugar cane juice rather than molasses, in French-speaking locales such as Martinique. A rhum vieux ("old rum") is an aged French rum that meets several other requirements.

Some of the many other names for rum are Nelson's blood, kill-devil, demon water, pirate's drink, navy neater, and Barbados water. A version of rum from Newfoundland is referred to by the name screech, while some low-grade West Indies rums are called tafia.

== History ==
=== Precursors and origins ===
- Early fermented sugarcane wines were widespread and have been made for thousands of years in Austronesian Island Southeast Asia, where sugarcane originated. They included basi, intus, and palek of the Philippines, kilaṅ and sīddhu of the ancient pre-Islamic Javanese people, and brum or brǝm (which also applied to rice beer) of the Javanese and Malay people.
- Marco Polo recorded a 14th-century account of a "very good wine of sugar(cane)" that was offered to him in the area that became modern-day Iran.
- A liquid identified as rum has been found in a tin bottle found on the Swedish warship Vasa, which sank in 1628.
- A sugar-making house under plantation owner Richard Ligon containing a furnace, a cooling basin, and a filling room has been recorded on the island of Barbados since 1673.
- Maria Dembinska states that King Peter I of Cyprus, also called Pierre I de Lusignan (9 October 1328 – 17 January 1369), brought rum with him as a gift for the other royal dignitaries at the Congress of Kraków, held in 1364. This is plausible given the position of Cyprus as a significant producer of sugar in the Middle Ages, although the alcoholic sugar drink named rum by Dembinska may not have resembled modern distilled rums very closely. Dembinska also suggests Cyprus rum was often drunk mixed with an almond milk drink, also produced in Cyprus, called soumada.
- Rum production has been recorded in Brazil in the 1520s.
- Shidhu, a drink produced by fermentation of sugarcane juice, is mentioned in Sanskrit texts.

Many historians now believe that rum-making found its way to the Caribbean islands, along with sugarcane and its cultivation methods, from Brazil. The traditional history of modern-style rum tells of its invention in the Caribbean, in the 17th century, by slaves on sugarcane plantations, who discovered that molasses, a by-product of the sugar refining process, could be fermented to produce alcohol, and then distilled. The earliest record, in a 1651 document from Barbados, mentions the island of Nevis in particular:

The chief fuddling they make in the island is Rumbullion, alias Kill-Divil, and this is made of sugar canes distilled, a hot, hellish, and terrible liquor.

By the late 17th century rum had replaced French brandy as the exchange alcohol of choice in the triangle trade. Canoemen and guards on the African side of the trade, who had previously been paid in brandy, were now paid in rum.

=== Colonial North America ===
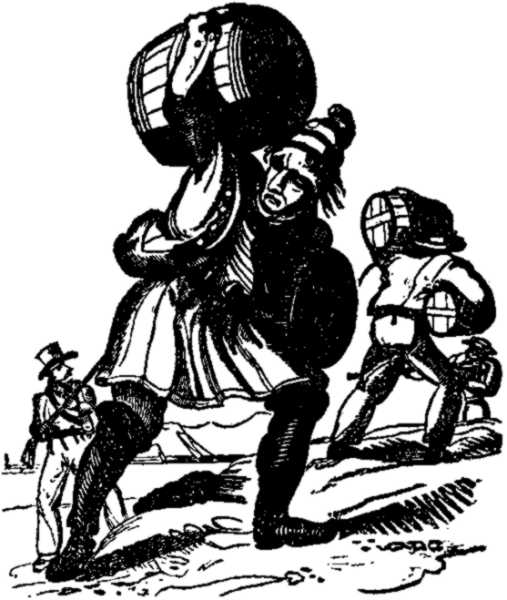
Pirates carrying rum to shore to purchase slaves as depicted in The Pirates Own Book by Charles Ellms

After the development of rum in the Caribbean, the drink's popularity spread to Colonial North America. To support the demand for the drink, the first rum distillery in the Thirteen Colonies was set up in 1664 on Staten Island, NY. Boston, Massachusetts, had a distillery three years later. The manufacture of rum became early colonial New England's largest and most prosperous industry. New England became a distilling centre also due to the technical, metalworking and cooperage skills and abundant lumber; the rum produced there was lighter: more like whisky. Much of the rum was exported, and distillers in Newport of Rhode Island even made an extra strong rum specifically to be used as a slave currency. Rhode Island rum even joined gold as an accepted currency in Europe for a period of time. While New England triumphed in price and consistency, Europeans still viewed the best rums as coming from the Caribbean. Estimates of rum consumption in the American colonies before the American Revolutionary War had every man, woman, or child drinking an average of 3 imperial gallons (14 L) of rum each year.

In the 18th century, ever increasing demands for sugar, molasses, rum, and slaves led to a feedback loop that intensified the triangular trade. When France banned the production of rum in their New World possessions to end the competition with domestically produced brandy, New England distillers became able to undercut producers in the British West Indies by buying molasses cheaply from French sugar plantations. The outcry from the British rum industry led to the Molasses Act 1733, which levied a prohibitive tax on molasses imported into the Thirteen Colonies from foreign countries or colonies. Rum at this time accounted for approximately 80% of New England's exports, and paying the duty would have put the distilleries out of business, so that compliance with and enforcement of the act were minimal. Strict enforcement of the Molasses Act's successor, the Sugar Act 1764, may have been an additional factor in causing the American Revolution. In the slave trade, rum was also used as a medium of exchange. For example, the slave Venture Smith, whose history was later published, had been purchased in Africa for four gallons of rum plus a piece of calico.

In "The Doctor's Secret Journal", an account of the happenings at Fort Michilimackinac in northern Michigan from 1769 to 1772 by Daniel Morison, a surgeon's mate, it was noted that there was not much for the men to do and drinking rum was very popular. In fact, Ensign Robert Johnstone, one of the officers, "thought proper to turn trader by selling (the) common rum to the soldiers & all others by whom he might gain a penny in this clandestine Manner". To conceal this theft, "he was observed to have filled up several Barrels of common rum with boiling water to make up the Leakage".

The popularity of rum continued after the American Revolution; George Washington insisted on a barrel of Barbados rum at his 1789 inauguration.

Rum started to play an important role in the political system, and candidates attempted to influence the outcome of an election through their generosity with rum. The people would attend the hustings to see which candidate appeared more generous. The candidate was expected to drink with the people to show he was independent and truly a republican.

=== Naval rum ===
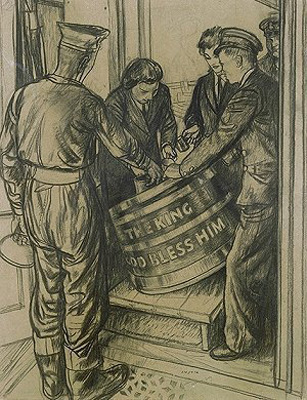
Wrens during World War II serving rum to a sailor from a tub inscribed "The King God Bless Him" - Robert Sargent Austin

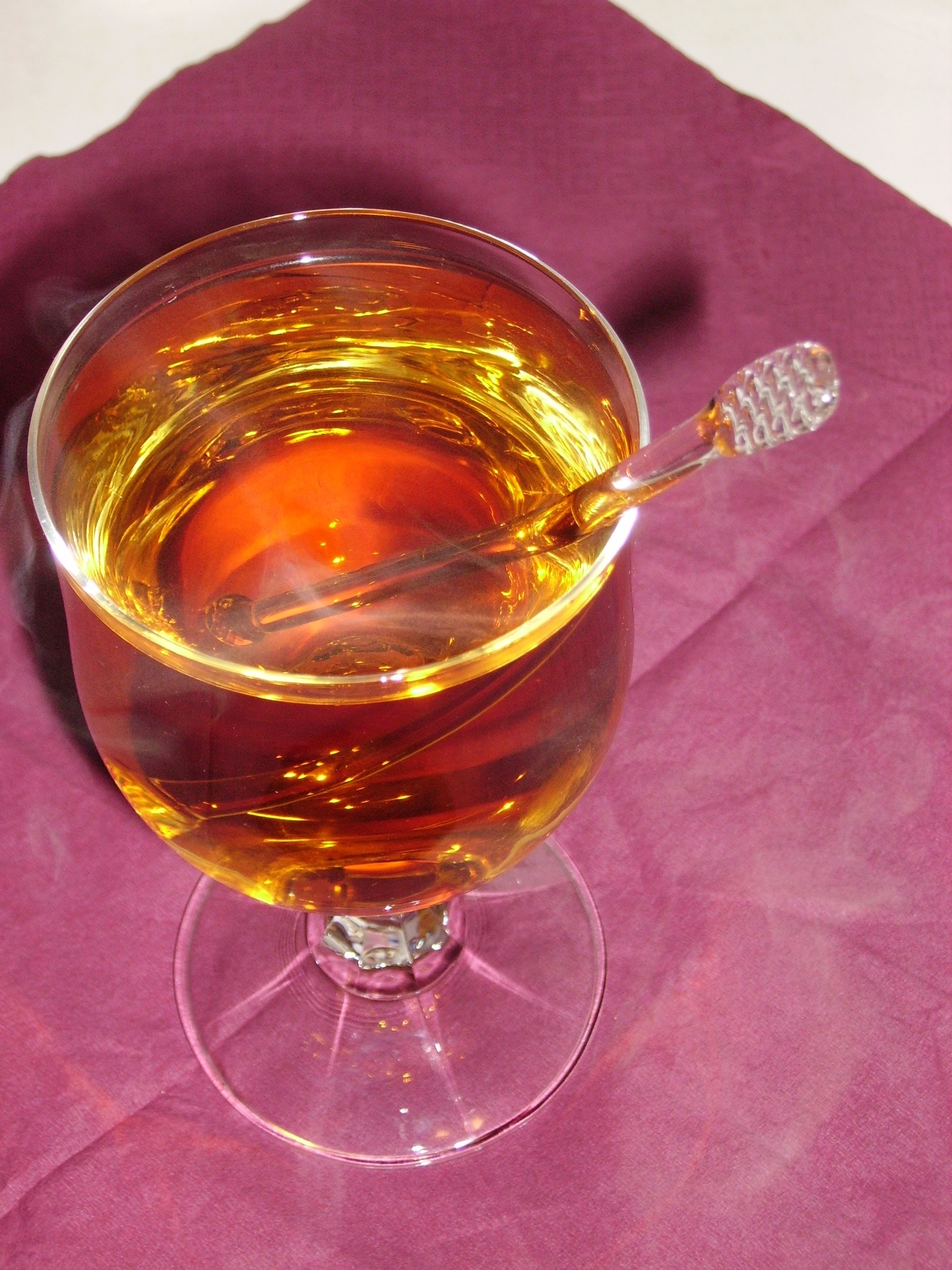
Rum grog

The association of rum with the Royal Navy began in 1655 when a Royal Navy fleet captured the island of Jamaica. With the availability of domestically produced rum, the British changed the daily ration of liquor given to seamen from French brandy to rum.

Rum's association with piracy began with English privateers' trading in the valuable commodity. During the Golden Age of Piracy, these English privateers and pirates in the Caribbean typically preferred to plunder the shores and ships of the Spanish Empire. However, in contrast to the bounty of rum in the English colonies, Spain forbade the production of rum across its colonial sugarcane plantations, as a protectionist measure for its own industries. As such, pirates actually were most likely to steal Spanish wine and brandy, and drink rum upon returning to Jamaica or Barbados. Despite this, the association between the rum and piracy was strengthened in popular culture by literary works such as Robert Louis Stevenson's Treasure Island, and Blackbeard's famous appetite for rum.

Naval rum was originally a blend mixed from rums produced in the West Indies. It was initially supplied at a strength of 100 degrees (UK) proof, 57% ABV, as that was the only strength that could be tested (by the gunpowder test) before the invention of the hydrometer. The term "Navy strength" is used in modern Britain to specify spirits bottled at 57% ABV. In 1866 the Navy fixed the issued strength at 95.5 proof (defined as "4.5 under-Proof", equal to 54.6% ABV).

While the ration was originally given neat or mixed with lime juice, the practice of watering down the rum began around 1740. To help minimize the effect of the alcohol on his sailors, Admiral Edward Vernon had the rum ration watered, producing a mixture that became known as grog. Many believe the term was coined in honour of the grogram cloak Admiral Vernon wore in rough weather. The Royal Navy continued to give its sailors a daily rum ration, known as a "tot", until the practice was abolished on 31 July 1970.

Today, a tot (totty) of rum is still issued on special occasions, using an order to "splice the mainbrace", which may only be given by a member of the royal family or, on certain occasions, the admiralty board in the UK, with similar restrictions in other Commonwealth navies. Recently, such occasions have included royal marriages or birthdays, or special anniversaries. In the days of daily rum rations, the order to "splice the mainbrace" meant double rations would be issued.

A legend involving naval rum and Horatio Nelson says that following his victory and death at the Battle of Trafalgar, Nelson's body was preserved in a cask of rum to allow transportation back to England. Upon arrival, however, the cask was opened and found to be empty of rum. The [pickled] body was removed and, upon inspection, it was discovered that the sailors had drilled a hole in the bottom of the cask and drunk all the rum, hence the term "Nelson's blood" being used to describe rum. It also serves as the basis for the term tapping the admiral being used to describe surreptitiously sucking liquor from a cask through a straw. The details of the story are disputed, as many historians claim the cask contained French brandy, while others claim that the term originated from a toast to Admiral Nelson. Variations of the story, involving different notable corpses, have been in circulation for many years. The official record states merely that the body was placed in "refined spirits" and does not go into further detail.

The Royal New Zealand Navy was the last naval force to give sailors a free daily tot of rum. The Royal Canadian Navy still gives a rum ration on special occasions; the rum is usually provided out of the commanding officer's fund and is 150 proof (75%). The order to "splice the mainbrace" (i.e. take rum) can be given by the monarch as commander-in-chief, as occurred on 29 June 2010, when Queen Elizabeth II gave the order to the Royal Canadian Navy as part of the celebration of their 100th anniversary.

=== Colonial Australia ===
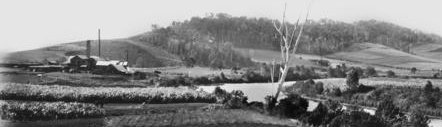
Beenleigh Rum Distillery, on the banks of the Albert River near Brisbane, Queensland, circa 1912

Rum became an important trade good in the early period of the colony of New South Wales. The value of rum was based upon the lack of coinage among the population of the colony, and due to the drink's ability to allow its consumer to temporarily forget about the lack of creature comforts available in the new colony. The value of rum was such that convict settlers could be induced to work the lands owned by officers of the New South Wales Corps. Due to rum's popularity among the settlers, the colony gained a reputation for drunkenness, though their alcohol consumption was less than levels commonly consumed in England at the time.

Australia was so far away from Britain that the penal colony, established in 1788, faced severe food shortages, compounded by poor conditions for growing crops and the shortage of livestock. Eventually, it was realized that it might be more economical to supply the settlement of Sydney from India, instead of from Britain. By 1817, two out of every three ships which left Sydney went to Java or India, and cargoes from Bengal fed and equipped the colony. Casks of Bengal Rum (which was reputed to be stronger and less sweet than Jamaican Rum) were brought back in the depths of nearly every ship from India. The cargoes were floated ashore clandestinely before the ships docked, by the Royal Marines regiment which controlled the sales. It was against the direct orders of the governors, who had ordered the searching of every docking ship. British merchants in India grew wealthy by sending ships to Sydney "laden half with rice and half with bad spirits".

Rum was intimately involved in the only military takeover of an Australian government, known as the Rum Rebellion. When William Bligh became governor of the colony, he attempted to remedy the perceived problem of drunkenness by outlawing the use of rum as a medium of exchange. In response to Bligh's attempt to regulate the use of rum, in 1808 the New South Wales Corps marched with fixed bayonets to Government House and placed Bligh under arrest. The mutineers continued to control the colony until the arrival of Governor Lachlan Macquarie in 1810.

=== Asia ===
In India, rum was not traditionally produced, as making jaggery from sugarcane does not leave molasses as a by-product. Commercial production began when Western-style cane sugar production processes made molasses available, allowing sugarcane plantations to yield high economic returns. Production expanded rapidly to meet both domestic and export markets, though protectionist policies excluded Great Britain, and continued after the end of the colonial era. Today, most spirits produced in India labelled as whisky, vodka and gin are made with a neutral rum-derived base.

Commercial rum production was introduced into Taiwan along with commercial sugar production during the Japanese colonial period. Rum production continued under the Republic of China, however, it was neglected by Taiwan Tobacco and Liquor Corporation which held the national liquor monopoly. The industry diversified after privatization and the de-monopolization of the Taiwanese alcoholic beverage industry.

== Categorization ==
Dividing rum into meaningful groupings is complicated because no single standard exists for what constitutes rum. Instead, rum is defined by the varying rules and laws of the different nations producing the spirit.

=== By former empires ===
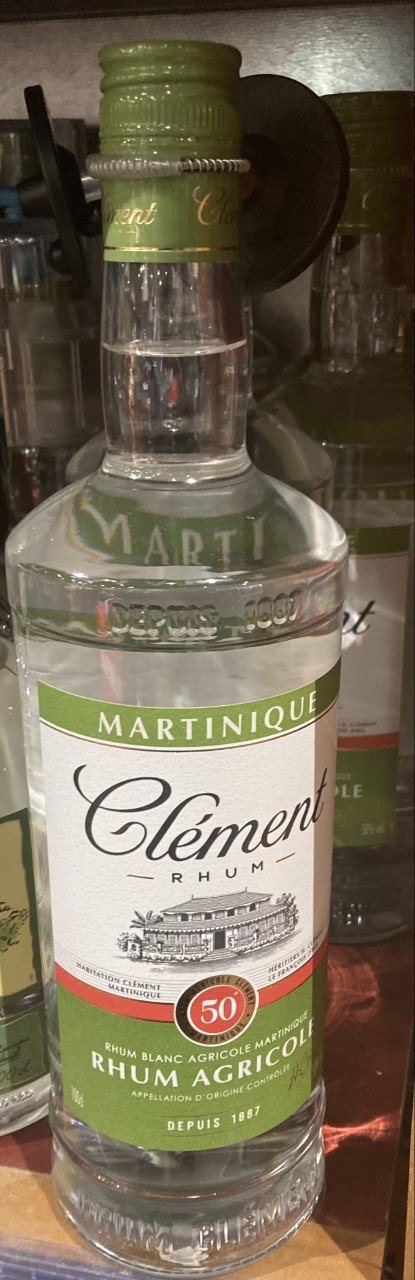
Rhum Clément is a white rhum agricole from Martinique

Rum production is not regulated by a single global standard, leading to a wide variety of styles. Historically, it was common to group styles of rum by the language of the colonial power that influenced production methods, though as time went on, and former colonies have created their unique rum identities and experimented with new technology, this classification is outdated.

==== English ====
The first recorded rum production (aside from cachaça) took place in Barbados. The base for English-style rums is usually molasses, and is fermented for a prolonged period of time, creating a higher concentration of congeners and esters. The employment of pot stills is the preferred method of rum production, which preserves the esters and congeners and creates a heavy-bodied rum. English-style rum is associated with sailors, and the Royal Navy in particular, which issued its sailors a daily tot. Jamaican rum is often funky, fruity, and high in esters, and such rums are called for frequently in tiki cocktails. Rum from Barbados and Guyana is also typical of the full-bodied English style. However, with changing consumer tastes, these countries also began using column stills to make very light rum, similar to the Spanish-style. For example, J. Wray & Nephew Ltd. produces both a heavy-flavoured unaged white overproof rum (Wray & Nephew) and a light, aged and filtered rum similar to Bacardi Superior (Kingston 62 White). The last surviving distillery in Trinidad and Tobago exclusively produces column still rum.

==== Spanish ====
For much of the history of the Spanish Empire, production of rum was strictly prohibited as a measure to protect Spanish wine and brandy production. The empire's control diminished in the late 1800s, around the same time as the popularization of the far more productive and efficient multi-column stills. Most rum made in the Spanish style is made with molasses, which is fermented for a short period, and distilled to a very high ABV, stripping the final product of esters and congeners, sometimes also blended with rum from a single-column still which is a bit heavier, but not as heavy as pot still rum. It is then barrel-aged (unaged rum is referred to as aguardiente), and most of the flavour comes from the ageing since little of it survives distillation. Ageing in the solera style, or a process that resembles it, is sometimes employed. Following the popularity of vodka in the 1950s, it became common to distill a very light rum, briefly age it, and then filter it until it is clear, such as Bacardi Superior rum from Puerto Rico. Rum producers in Central and South America typically also heavily sweeten their rums, though this practice did not become common in Cuba or Puerto Rico.

==== French ====
French-style rum is known for rhum agricole (agricultural rum in French), which is a spirit distilled from fresh sugar cane juice, and has a vegetal, grassy, and earthy profile. However, the French colonies such as Martinique, Guadeloupe, and Réunion historically produced sugar and made traditional rum from the molasses. The shift started when Britain's naval supremacy cut Napoleon off from the colonial sugar supplies, causing him to aggressively invest in beet sugar. Beet sugar caused sugar prices in the Caribbean in general to drop, and following a volcanic eruption which destroyed most distilleries and stocks of rum on the island, Martinique turned its sugar cane fields to producing rum instead of sugar. Column stills arrived earlier to the French colonies than to the Spanish ones, so early column stills were short Creole stills that still preserved many of the flavours from the cane juice. Martinique and Guadeloupe continue to produce rum from molasses, though in smaller quantities than rhum agricole. While other countries produce cane juice spirit, such as Brazil and Haiti, these cannot be called rhum agricole.

=== Regional variations ===
Several categories of sugar cane spirit exist which are distinct from the primary traditions of Caribbean rum:

==== Cachaça ====
Brazil produces cachaça, a spirit made from fresh cane juice, similar to rhum agricole, and is often legally distinct from rum.

==== Aguardiente ====
Several Latin American countries produce aguardiente, an unaged cane spirit. Its ABV can be below normal legal thresholds for rum, and is often flavoured with anise. Mexico has a version called charanda.

==== John Crow Batty ====
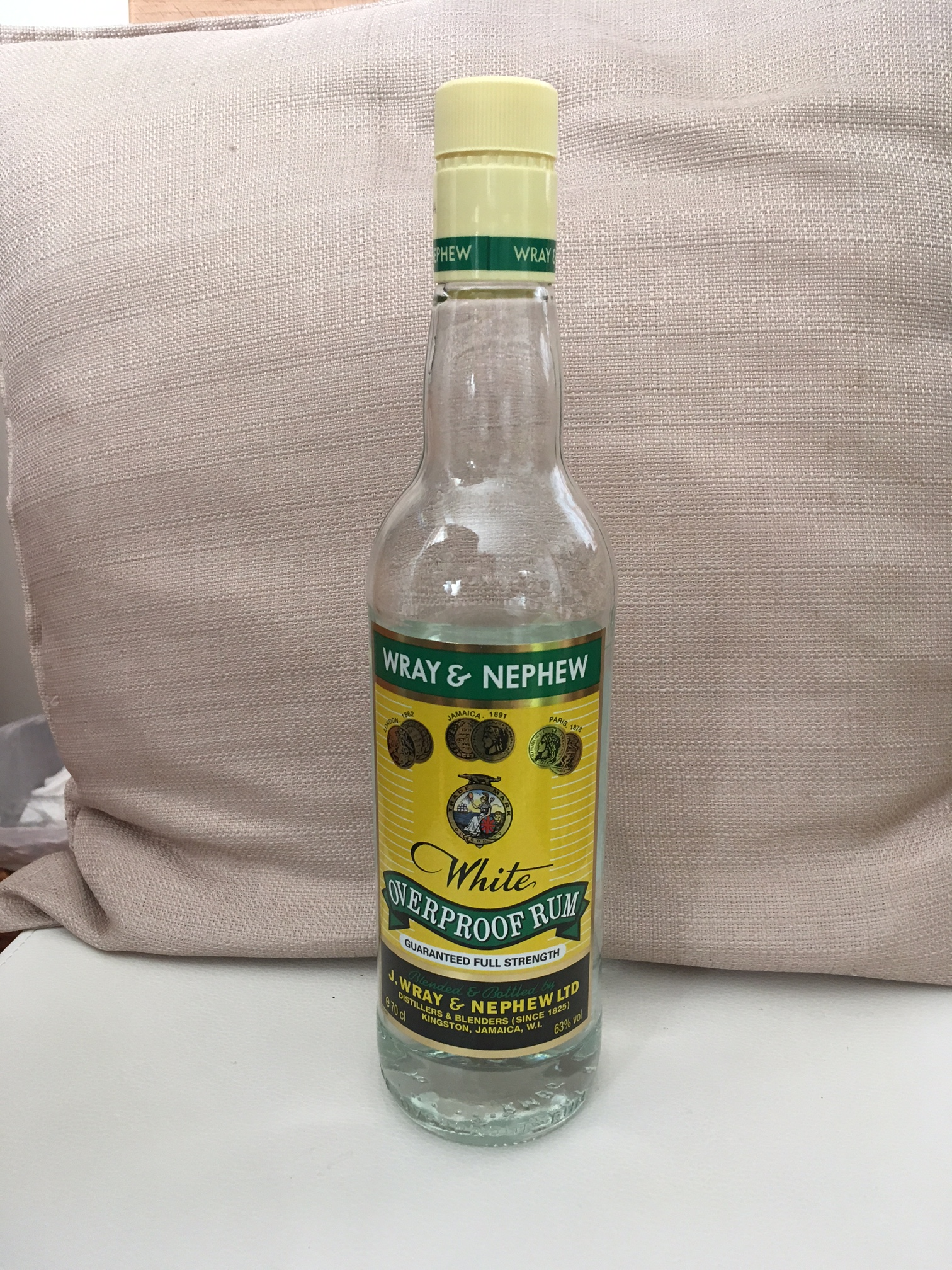
Wray & Nephew White Overproof Rum 63% ABV is a "white proof rum" that is emblematic of Jamaican rum

Jamaica has a long history of producing "white proof rum", an unaged, high-strength spirit historically recorded at strengths of at least 57% ABV. "John Crow Batty" (also known as "rude rum" or "kullu kullu") is a Jamaican term referring to extremely strong, unrefined rum, historically associated with workers at Hampden and Long Pond stealing the heads and tails left over from rum production, creating a low-grade, intense rum full of esters and congeners, particularly undesirable ones such as fusel alcohols. The name "John Crow Batty" is derived from Jamaican slang: "john crow" is a name for the turkey vulture, and "batty" means rear end, reflecting the rum's foul taste and the iron stomach required to drink it. This harsh rum became popular in Jamaica, being used in medicine, christenings, and warding off evil spirits, and continues to be illicitly produced and consumed. Modern commercial Jamaican white overproof rums are typically produced at 63% ABV (110 UK proof), and Charley's J.B. Overproof and Hampden's Rum Fire were created to draw from their historic ties to "John Crow Batty". Beyond John Crow Batty's direct descendants, Wray & Nephew, a similar traditional strong-flavoured Jamaican white overproof rum, is mixed with carbonated beverage Ting to prepare what is described as the "unofficial drink of Jamaica".

==== Clairin ====
Haiti produces clairin, a spirit made from fresh cane juice, similar to rhum agricole.

==== Puncheon rum ====
Trinidad produces Puncheon rum, an overproof unaged spirit with historic ties to the island.

=== Regulation by the European Union ===
The European Union regulates the sale of rum. From 25 May 2021, spirits labelled as rum must be unflavoured, unadulterated or diluted with alcohol, and produced using only cane sugar or molasses, with a minimum ABV of 37.5%. Additionally, though it is permitted for rum to be sweetened with sugar, rum may not contain more than 20g of added sugar per litre.

=== Geographical indication ===
In an effort to protect the quality and reputation of their countries' rum exports, several countries have passed, or are considering passing, geographical indication (GI) protections for the manufacturing process of their cane spirits. The following are some of the more notable examples of rum GIs, though the list is not exhaustive:

==== Jamaica ====
The Spirits Pool Association (SPA) has pushed to establish a Jamaican rum GI. In opposition is National Rums of Jamaica (NRJ), which is owned in part by the government of Jamaica, Demerara Distillers, and Maison Ferrand, the latter which owns the West Indies Rum Distillery (WIRD), manufacturer of Planteray rum, which is finished in cognac barrels in France. WIRD has also been a vocal opponent of the Barbados rum GI.

Jamaican rum was granted geographical indication protection in 2016. This GI stipulates the yeasts that can be used, that the ageing can only take place in Jamaica in barrels of certain criteria, and that there can be nothing added to the rum besides water for dilution and caramel color for consistency.

There have been accusations that NRJ is representing the interests of a French company by opposing the GI. In 2017, NRJ was partially purchased by Maison Ferrand, which also own the West Indies Rum Distillery and have been in opposition to a Barbados rum GI, since their business model relies on exporting rum and ageing it in France. The SPA claim that NRJ never opposed a Jamaican rum GI until the purchase by WIRD. SPA Chairman Clement Lawrence asserted that foreign ageing diminishes the authenticity of Jamaican rum and could potentially allow for imitations. The SPA also argues that, much like Scotch whisky and cognac must be aged in their respective regions to protect their identity, "Jamaican rum deserves no less respect." They argue that tropical ageing is also significantly more aggressive than continental ageing in the more temperate climate of Europe, and so ageing in Jamaica creates is vital to the essence of Jamaican rum. A product that is protected by a GI can also charge 1.5-2.7 times higher prices due to the effects of being premium. The SPA also argues that ageing abroad results in a loss of jobs in Jamaica, since the country where the rum is aged will profit from the added value of blending, bottling, and labelling as well as rum tourism, similar to France's wine tourism industry.

NRJ defends its Jamaican identity, citing its Jamaican CEO and the fact that its distilleries represent 40% of Jamaica's rum production and export. NRJ claims that its opposition is rooted in the desire to expand Jamaican rum's reach in a changing world, and that exporting bulk rum is a necessity to meet the commercial reality of rum demand. NRJ claims that Jamaican rum is primarily characterized by fermentation-driven flavours and the pot distillation methods which retain them, and that therefore ageing outside of the country would not diminish the authenticity. Howard Mitchell, a former consultant to NRJ, has called references to Maison Ferrand as a colonial opportunist and Jamaicans as naïve or complicit as an insult to the intelligence and sovereignty of Jamaica’s institutions and stakeholders, and that not only does the government of Jamaica own as much of NRJ as Maison Ferrand, but J. Wray & Nephew, one of the companies adversarial to NRJ in the battle over the Jamaican rum GI, is owned entirely by Italian spirits conglomerate Campari Group. He also argues that since Jamaica started producing rum, it has been exported to be aged overseas. Historically, rum in Jamaica was mostly consumed and exported unaged or lightly aged, and most aged Jamaican rums were aged overseas, such as London Dock Rum.

However, following the October 2024 amendments by the Jamaica Intellectual Property Office (JIPO) to disallow aging Jamaican rum abroad for the GI, NRJ filed a complaint with the Fair Trading Commission (FTC) that this amounts to an anti-competitive practice, and the FTC has launched investigations into the allegations. Unlike some distilleries, such as Appleton Estate and Worthy Park, the distilleries under NRJ heavily depend on exporting rum to be blended and aged outside of the country, and NRJ asserts that this GI exists to stifle the competition of J. Wray & Nephew, the biggest player in Jamaican rum. Meanwhile, J. Wray & Nephew holds the largest stock of aged rum in Jamaica as well as more than half of the island's sugarcane crop, and NRJ alleges that they abuse their dominance, engage in price fixing, and are conspiring to restrict competition via this GI.

NRJ also appealed this decision to the Jamaican Supreme Court, arguing that the power to amend the GI Act is exclusive to the Registrar of Industrial Property, and so the changes made by Shantal English, a hearing officer at JIPO, are illegal. On September 19, 2025, the Supreme Court sided with NRJ and issued a temporary injunction against the changes made to the GI by JIPO, not allowing the SPA to process any applications under the new GI certification. The court noted that the immediate effect of this new standard would cause irreparable damage to NRJ, while delaying this law would be less harmful since aging overseas is the status quo and historic norm. J. Wray & Nephew, a giant in rum production, filed to be removed as a defendant in this suit, but the court denied this motion due to J. Wray & Nephew's "direct, adversarial commercial interest" against NRJ.

==== Martinique ====
Martinique rhum was granted geographical indication protection in 1997. This GI stipulates that rhum agricole from Martinique must be made from cane juice, on certain parts of the island during certain times of the year, fermentation batch size and duration, and in a column still of creole configuration.

==== Saint Lucia ====
In January 2025, the Saint Lucia's application for a rum GI, filed by Saint Lucia Distillers, was accepted.

==== Attempts at geographical indication ====
===== Barbados =====
Producers in Barbados have debated seeking GI protection for their rum. The three distilleries of Foursquare, St Nicholas Abbey and Mount Gay, which make up the majority of rum aged in Barbados, make rum in a traditional Barbadian style with no added sugar and support a Barbadian GI. The GI is opposed by West Indies Rum Distillery (WIRD), which makes the majority of rum produced in and exported from Barbados, selling large quantities of sweetened, unaged rum to brands like Malibu, and producing Planteray rum, which is often sweetened and finished in cognac barrels in France. Richard Seale, owner and master distiller at Foursquare, has criticized shipping goods for finishing in Europe as a colonial practice that reduces economic value retained in Barbados. Seale has advocated against additives in rum and confronted brands for adding sugar to rum. WIRD, however, argues that sweetening rum is in line with tradition, doesn't diminish the rum, and can improve it.

===== Tahiti =====
According to Marotea Vitrac, president of the Défense de l’Indication Géographique Rhum Agricole de Polynésie Française, Tahiti has been working on a GI for the past five years as of 2025, and anticipates that it will be finalized in 2026.

==== Other protections ====
- CARICOM is a trade, production, and quality standard decided by and enforced by multiple Caribbean countries. While not a GI itself, member nations are obliged to adhere to its requirements, and it forms the foundation for some Caribbean countries' GI standards, such as Haiti's HaïRum.
- In 1934, Jamaican lawmakers passed a cap for the maximum ester count that a rum can have to be allowed for export. This was in response to a cheap German substitute for Jamaican rum called Rum-Verschnitt (literally: blended or "cut" rum). This drink is made of genuine dark rum (often high-ester rum from Jamaica), rectified spirit, and water, often coloured with caramel coloring. The proportion of genuine rum it contains can be quite low; the legal minimum is only 5%. This caused a decline in demand, and therefore income, which threatened the Jamaican rum industry.

=== Commercial categorization ===
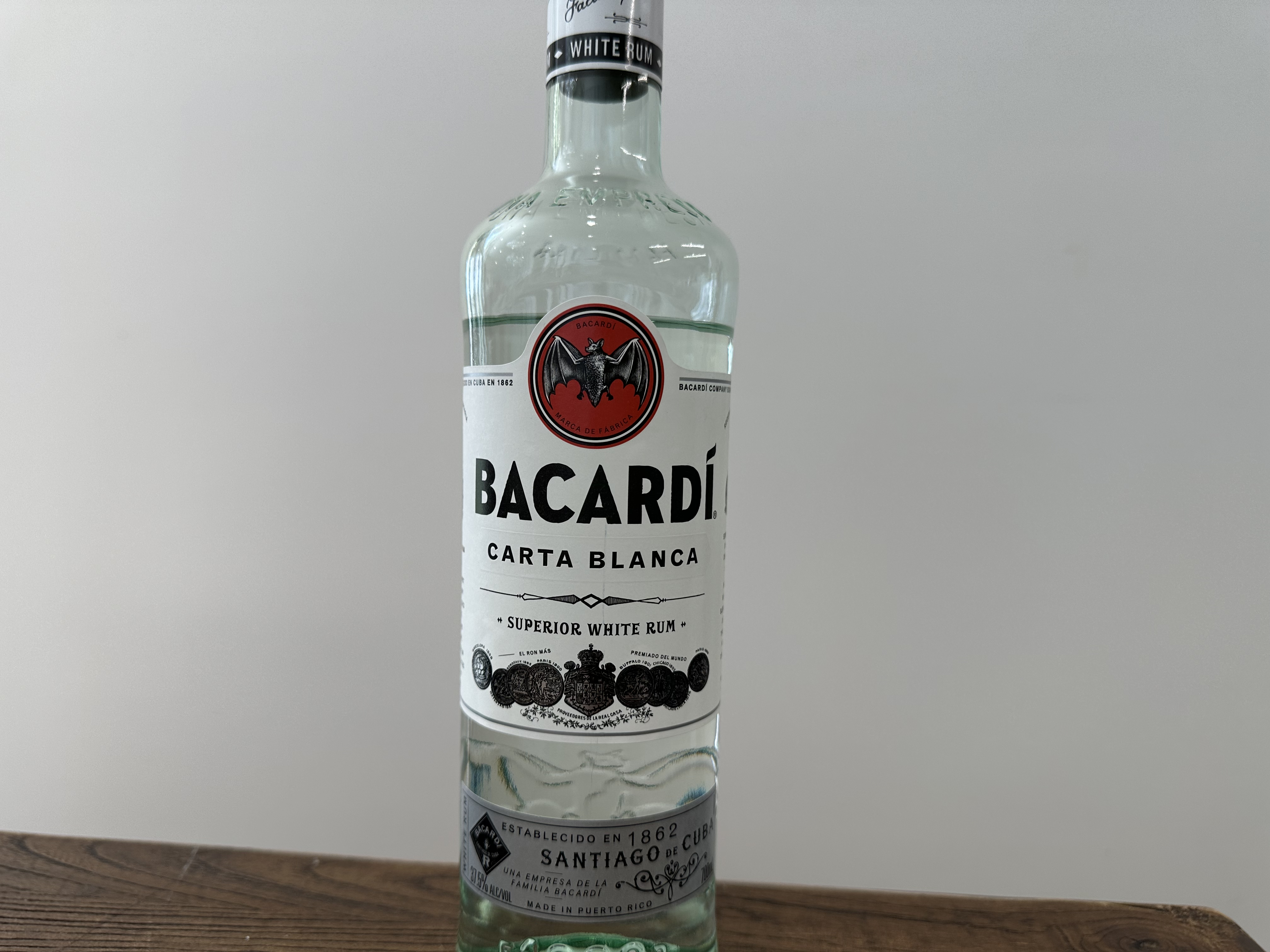
Bacardi Superior is a typical light rum

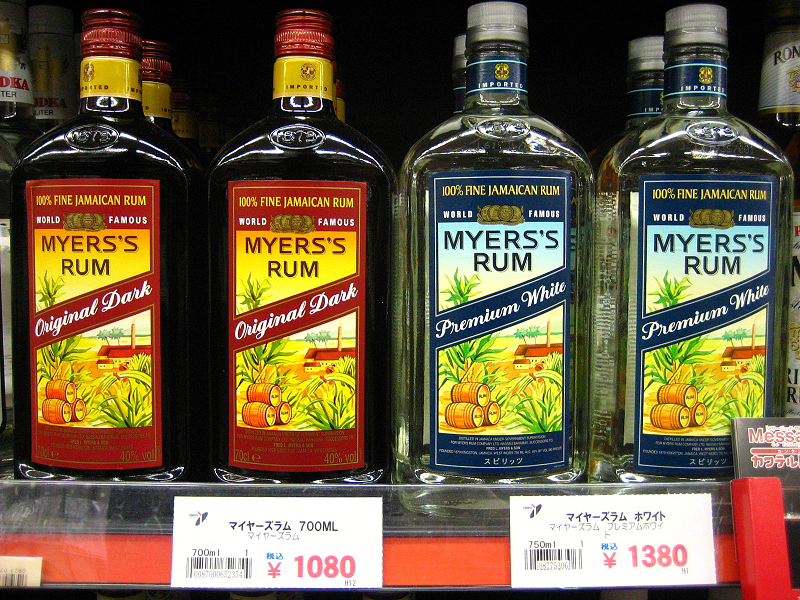
Myers's is a widely-available dark/black rum

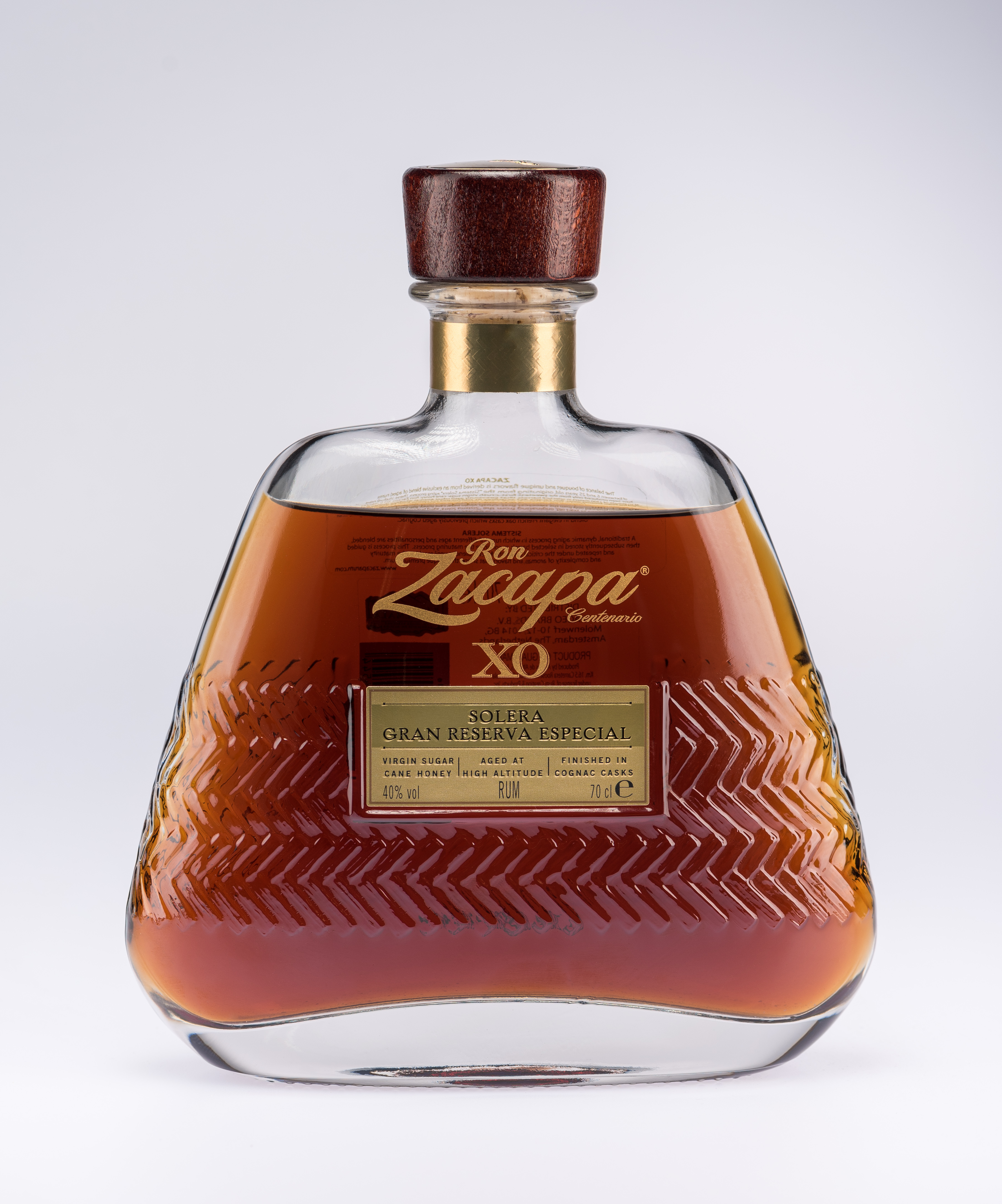
Ron Zacapa XO can be considered a premium rum

There is no universal standard way of categorizing rum. However, retailers and consumers often use the following terms to organize and describe rum, despite experts noting that this sort of categorization is limiting. The colour of a rum does not indicate how long it has been aged, or if it has been aged at all, as an aged rum can be filtered clear, and an unaged rum can be dyed gold or even black.

- Light rums, also called "silver" or "white" rums, refers to a category of Spanish-style column-distilled rums that are light in colour and flavour. They may be unaged, or they may be aged and then filtered to remove colour. Their mild flavours make them popular for use in mixed drinks as opposed to drinking straight. Light rums are included in some of the most popular cocktails, including the Mojito and the Daiquiri. Many other styles of rum can be clear, such as Martinique rhum agricole or Jamaican white overproof, but these are not what this category typically refers to.
- Gold rums, also called "amber" rums, are rums that are gold in colour and generally aged. They often gain their colour and body from aging in wooden barrels (usually the charred, white oak barrels that are the byproduct of bourbon whiskey), though caramel colour can be used to deepen the colour. Counterintuitively, a longer aged gold rum is often lighter in colour, as companies tend to dye very young rums aggressively, while higher quality rums remain their true pale yellow colour.
- Dark rums, also called "black" or "blackstrap" rums, are defined by their dark brown, black, or red colours, are darker than gold rums. They usually have additions of colour and/or molasses, or can be aged in heavily charred barrels, giving them much spicier flavours with strong molasses or caramel overtones; however, this term is largely unregulated, and most dark rums are cheap rums heavily dyed with caramel. In addition, dark rum is the type most commonly used in cooking. Most dark rums come from Caribbean islands such as Jamaica, the Bahamas, Barbados, and Guyana.
- Añejo rums - Light rum that has been aged. Unlike tequila aging, there are no common guidelines concerning how long the liquor has to be matured to qualify. Instead, this is left to the distiller. Generally a "dark, smooth-sipping" rum comparable "to cognac."
- Premium rums, also called "sipping" or "aged" rums, are sold as top-shelf liquor and often have age statements of many years, higher prices, and nicer packaging. They may also be transferred to another cask during the aging process to impart additional flavours and complexity, a process known as finishing, or aged in the solera style. As enforcement of age statements is not standardized, many premium rums may have misleading age statements (such as taking the age of oldest component in a blend instead of the youngest), or no age statements at all, but with a large number on the label that implies age.
- Overproof rums are much stronger than the standard 40% ABV (80 proof), usually more than 50% ABV (100 proof or full proof), though legal definitions vary. Modern naval rums are a type of overproof rum that is dark and heavy bodied, reminiscent of historic naval rums and the Royal Navy's discontinued tot rations.
- Spiced rums are flavoured with spices. Most are darker in colour than other rums, sometimes significantly so, though they are often based on light rums, neutral in flavour from being distilled in continuous column stills. Though rum has been spiced throughout history, the modern popularity of spiced rum in the United States started in the 1980s with the introduction of Captain Morgan spiced rum. Some rums, such as Old Monk, have spices added, but not to the level to legally or commercially classify them as spiced rum.
- Flavored rums are infused with flavors of fruits, such as banana, mango, orange, pineapple, coconut, starfruit or lime. These are generally less than 40% ABV (80 proof). They mostly serve to flavor similarly themed tropical drinks, and the flavors are added after fermentation and distillation.
- Spirit drinks can be based on rum, and can imitate rum. Though they are not rum, they are commonly found on liquor shelves alongside rum, and are often substitute goods for rum. Some common examples are the coconut-flavored, rum-based liqueur Malibu, the Austrian Inländer-Rum Stroh, the rum-flavored beet sugar spirit Tuzemak, and the Dominican blend of rum, wine, spices, and other ingredients known as Mamajuana.

=== Gargano categorization ===
Luca Gargano, a prominent rum expert, has proposed an alternative to the typical commercial categorization scheme. He proposed that rums be categorized not by their color or proof, but by the artisanal nature of the production process. His classification method divides rums based on 4 criteria:

- Ingredients: The base fermentable of the rum has a significant effect on the taste. Sugarcane rum has a significantly different taste from molasses rum, which is by far the most common type of rum. Whether the cane juice is organic, hybridized, and whether it is fresh or cooked down to a syrup also has an effect.
- Fermentation: The final product is affected by the fermentation depending on the yeast used for producing the wine, how much water is added, and also whether additional substances, such as dunder, bagasse, or vinegar are added.
- Aging: The factors that affect aging are the type of wood, the ABV of the spirit being aged, and whether the barrel is new, or was previously used for aging other wines or spirits. Likewise, whether it was aged in a hot tropical climate, or in a cooler, moist climate, will have a large effect on the aging process.
- Distillation: Rum can be distilled in a variety of stills. It can be distilled in batch stills (such as in a pot still), in a Coffey or Creole still, or a blend of several types of stills. Gargano notes that all of these can produce rums of high quality. He notes that multi-column distillation is designed to produce as much ethanol as possible and may reduce the substances that give its flavor and aroma. According to Gargano, "... if you distill in a multi column, you lose everything".

=== Smuggler's Cove classification ===
Martin Cate, author and tiki bar owner, offered a system that allows for choices and substitutions when mixing cocktails without significantly altering the final product. It categorizes based on the role in a tiki drink rather than actual production (eg. Wray & Nephew white overproof is listed as a pot still unaged because it behaves more like the other pot still unaged rums, despite being a blended rum in reality). The Smuggler's Cove book features 21 categories, broadly based on base material and production, and sub-categories usually based on age, with two meta-categories dividing the list. There are also 8 categories given a number, as with these 8 categories, one can make most tiki cocktails listed in the book.

Molasses and evaporated cane rums:

- Pot still (unaged, lightly aged(1), aged, long aged)
- Blended (lightly aged(2), aged(3), long aged)
- Column still (lightly aged, aged(4), long aged)
- Black (pot still, blended(5), overproof(6))

Fresh cane juice rums:

- Cane Coffey still aged
- Cane pot still (unaged, aged)
- Cane AOC Martinique rhum agricole (blanc(7), vieux(8), long aged)
- Pot still cachaça (unaged, aged)

=== Jamaican ester counts ===
Historically, Jamaican rum marks were categorized by their ester levels, specifically ethyl acetate, measured in grams per hectoliter of absolute alcohol (gr/hLAA), to determine their value in blending. This system started in the late 1800s as a way to grade rum for sale.

The original measurements were in "parts per 100,000 alcohol" and modern measurements are in gr/hLAA units.

- 80-150 gr/hL AA: Common Clean
- 150-200 gr/hL AA: Plummer
- 200-300 gr/hL AA: Wedderburn
- 700-1600 gr/hL AA: Flavored/Continental/German (in reference to Germans using these marks for Rum-Verschnitt)

A "flavored" rum means a very strong, high-ester rum with a big smell and taste, without added flavor. Historically, it was also called "Continental" or "German" because it was used in Europe for blending, and not for drinking on its own.

== Production method ==
Unlike some other spirits, rum has no defined production methods. Instead, rum production is based on traditional styles that vary between locations and distillers.

=== Harvesting ===
Sugarcane is traditionally collected by sugarcane machete cutters who cut the cane near to the ground, where the largest concentration of sugars is found, before lopping off the green tips. A good cutter can cut three tons of cane per day on average, but this is a small fraction of what a machine can cut. Therefore, mechanised harvesting is now used.

=== Extraction ===
Sugarcane comprises around 63% to 73% water, 12% to 16% soluble sugar, 2% to 3% non-sugars, and 11% to 16% fiber. To extract the water and sugar juice, the harvested cane is cleaned, sliced into small lengths, and milled (pressed).

=== Fermentation ===
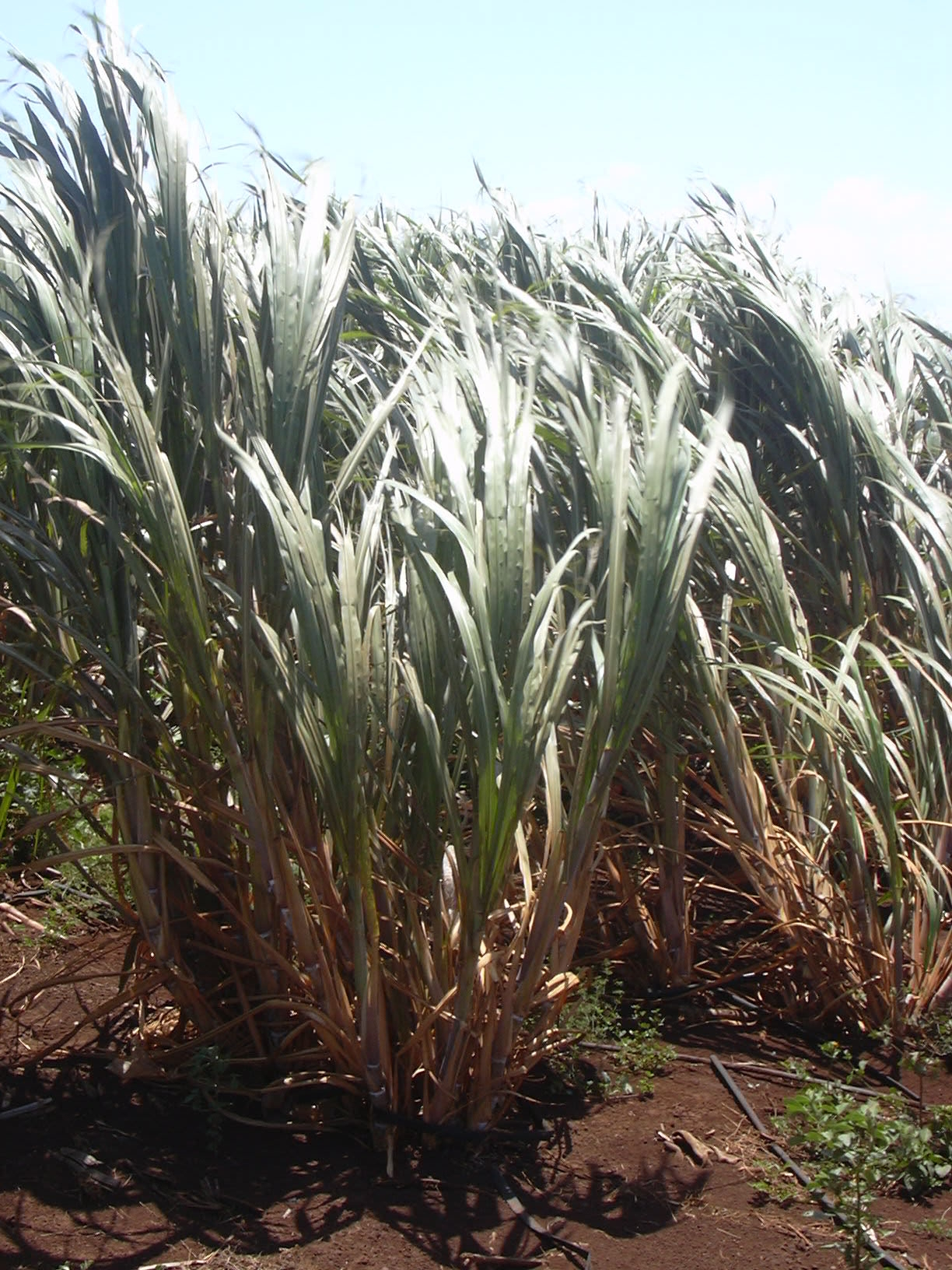
Sugarcane is harvested to make sugarcane juice and molasses

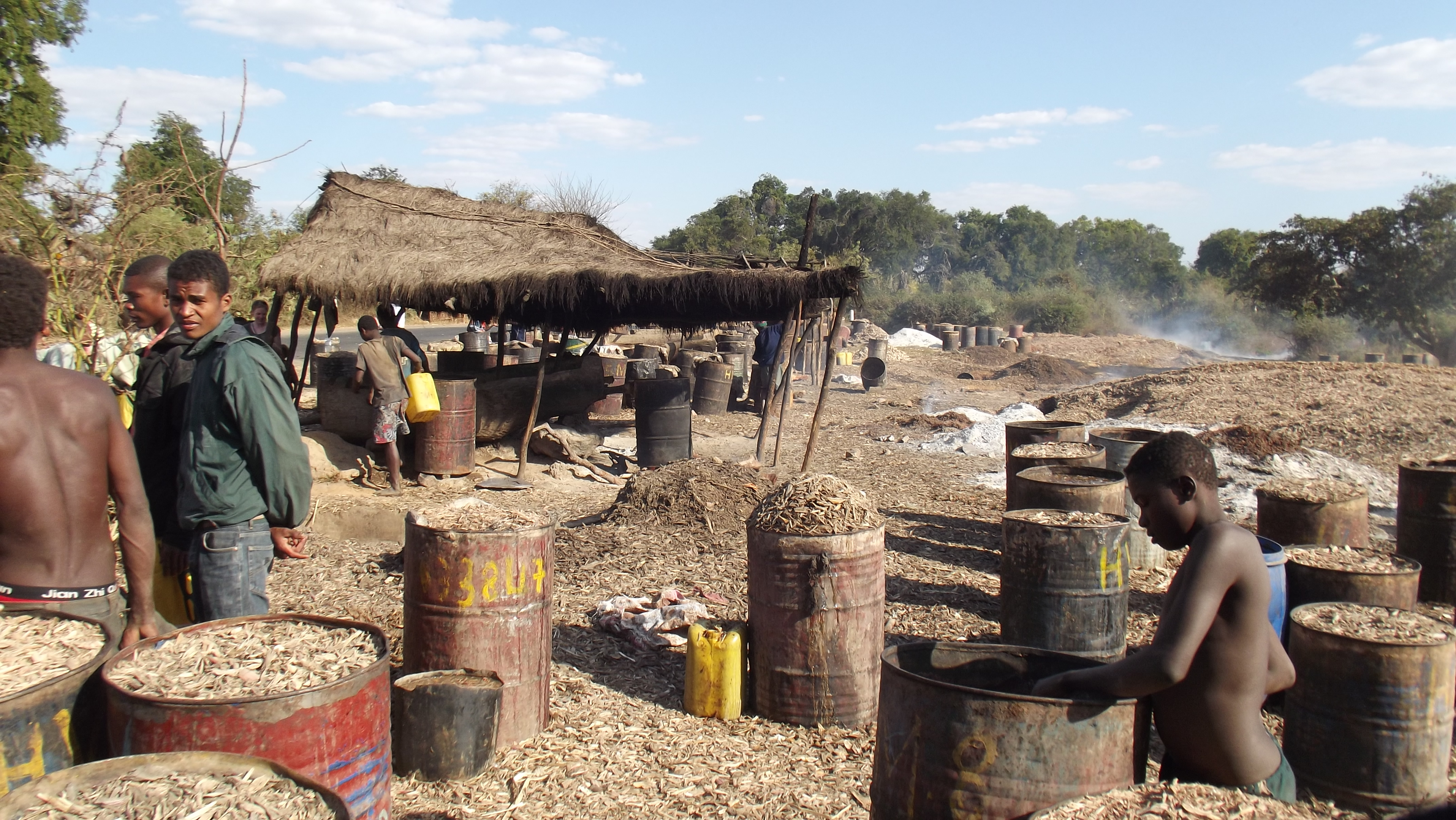
Artisanal rum distillery along the N7 road in Madagascar

Most rum is produced from molasses, a byproduct of sugar production. A rum's quality is dependent on the quality and variety of the sugarcane. The sugar cane's quality depends on the soil type and climate where it is grown. Within the Caribbean, much of this molasses comes from Brazil. A notable exception is the French-speaking islands, where sugarcane juice is the preferred base ingredient. In Brazil itself, the distilled alcoholic drink derived from cane juice is distinguished from rum and called cachaça.

Yeast and water are added to the base ingredient to start fermentation. While some rum producers allow wild yeasts to ferment naturally, most use specific strains of yeast to help provide a consistent taste and fermentation period. Dunder, the yeast-rich foam from previous fermentations, is the traditional yeast source in Jamaica. "The yeast employed will determine the final taste and aroma profile," says Jamaican master blender Joy Spence. Distillers that make lighter rums, such as Bacardi, prefer to use faster-working yeasts. The use of slower-working yeasts causes more esters to accumulate during fermentation, allowing for a fuller-tasting rum. Fermentation creates acids and esters like ethyl butyrate and ethyl hexanoate that contribute to rum's sweet and fruity flavors.

=== Distillation ===
The fermented product is then distilled. As with all other aspects of rum production, no standard method is used for distillation. While some producers use batch distillation with pot stills, most rum is produced using column still. Pot still output contains more congeners than column still output, resulting in fuller-tasting rums.

=== Aging and blending ===
Many countries require rum to be barrel-aged for at least one year. Rum is commonly aged in used bourbon casks, but any type of wooden cask or stainless-steel tank may be used. Rum ages colorless in stainless steel, but becomes dark in wood. Freshly distilled, especially pot-stilled, rum often has a meaty or leathery, sulfurous scent owing largely to the concentration of esters and known in centuries past as hogo, but aged rum displays this much less, although agricole and some Demerara and Jamaican rums retain a marked note of it.

As most rum-producing areas have a hot, tropical climate, rum matures much faster than is typical in cooler climates for spirits such as whisky or brandy. An indication of this higher rate is the "angels' share", the amount lost to evaporation: about 10% per year for rum, while in France and Scotland aging loss is typically 2%.

The final stage after aging is usually blending rum for a consistent flavor. During blending, light rums may be filtered to remove any colour gained during aging; for dark rums, caramel may be added for colour.

There have been attempts to match the molecular composition of aged rum significantly faster using heat and light for accelerated artificial aging.

== In cuisine ==
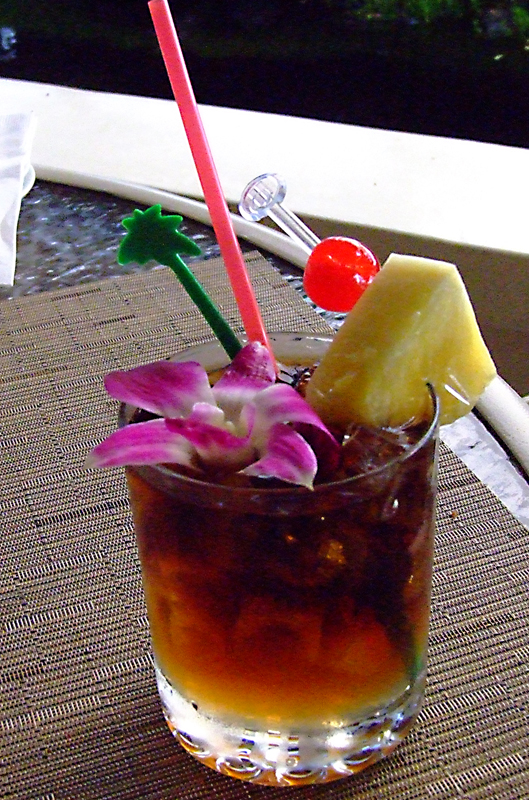
The Mai Tai is one of the quintessential Tiki cocktails

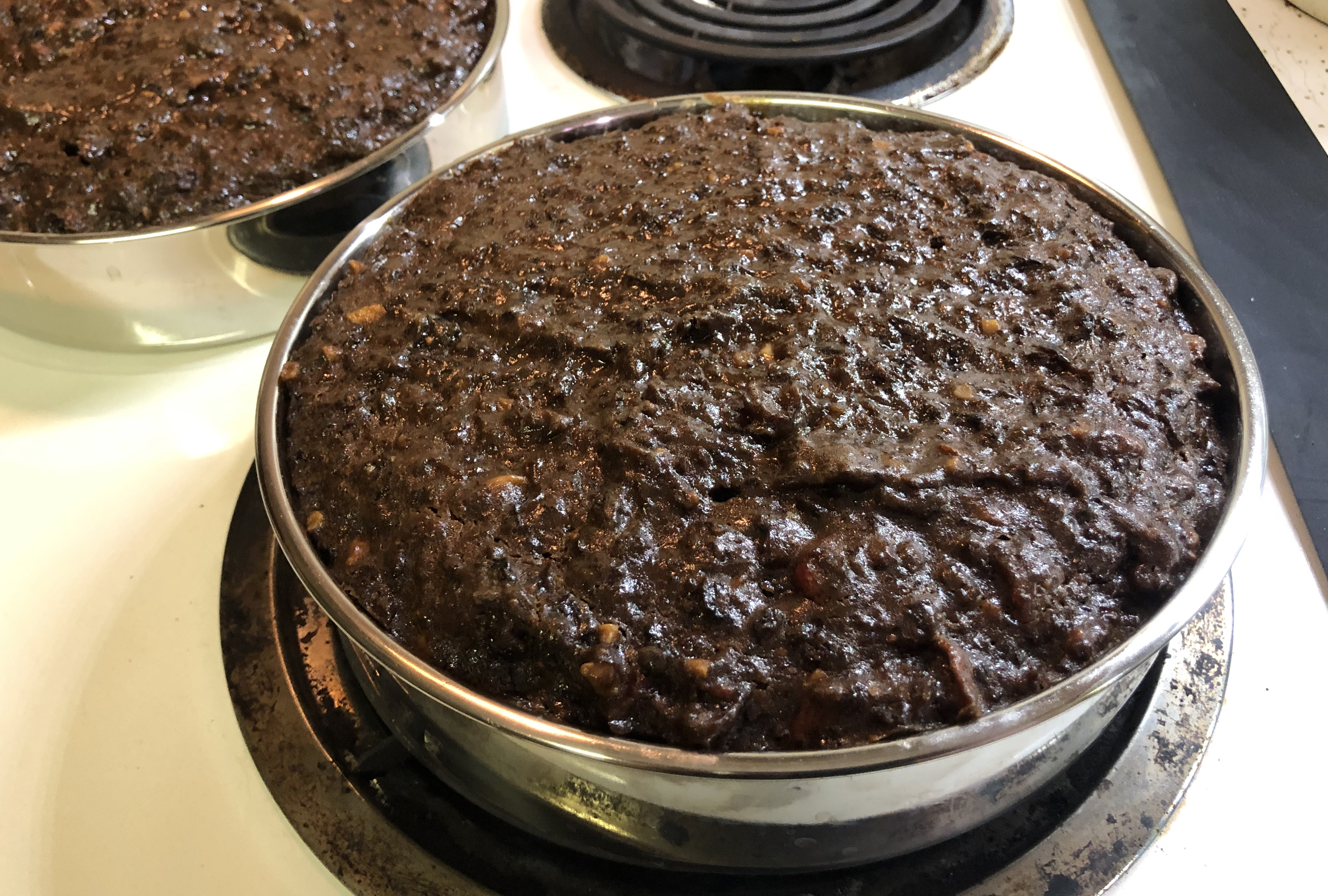
Trinidad and Tobago-style black cake is a rum cake made with preserved fruit

=== Mixology ===
Rum is the foundation of numerous classic cocktails. Many have their histories rooted in the Caribbean, such as rum punch, the rum and Coke (Cuba libre), and daiquiri, while American tiki bars popularized tropical-themed drinks such as the Mai Tai, the Long Island iced tea, the Jungle Bird and the zombie. Other widely-known rum cocktails include the piña colada, the mojito, and a precursor of the classic Spanish sangria known as sangaree. Cold-weather drinks made with rum include the rum toddy and hot buttered rum.

==== Regional specialties ====
Regional specialties include Bermuda's Dark 'n' Stormy, made with dark rum and ginger beer, the Painkiller from the British Virgin Islands, and a New Orleans cocktail known as the Hurricane. Jagertee is a mixture of rum and black tea popular in colder parts of Central Europe and served on special occasions in the British Army, where it is called Gunfire. Ti' Punch, French Creole for "petit punch", is a traditional drink in parts of the French West Indies. Coquito is an eggnog-like traditional Christmastime coconut-based drink from Puerto Rico.

Rum may also be used as a base in the manufacture of liqueurs and syrups, such as falernum and Mamajuana.

=== Cooking and baking ===
Rum, particularly dark or black rum (or cheaper rum essence), is used in a number of cooked dishes as a flavoring agent in items such as rum cakes. It is commonly used to macerate fruit used in fruitcakes, in the preparation of rumtopf and Joe Frogger cookies, and in marinades for some Caribbean dishes. Rum can be used in flambé dishes, such as bananas Foster. Rum can also be used in raw or cold dishes so that the alcohol is not cooked off, such as in rum balls, hard sauces, or incorporated into ice cream, often with raisins, to create a flavor of ice cream known as rum raisin.

== See also ==
- Cachaça
- Charanda
- Clairin
- Liquor
- List of rum brands
- List of rum producers
- Mamajuana
- Rhum agricole
- Rum cake
- Rum cocktails
- Rum row
- Rum-running
- Tafia
