= Cockspur Rum =

Rum from Barbados

Cockspur Rum is a rum brand produced in Barbados. Its logo shows the island's traditional rooster.

== History ==
Cockspur was launched by the sea captain Valdemar Hanschell during the early 20th century. Cockspur's parent company became Hanschell Larson in 1928, and Hanschell Innis Ltd. in 1971. It was acquired by Goddard Enterprises in 1973.

In 2017, Hanschell Inniss Ltd. sold Corkspur to Woodland Radicle for an undisclosed amount.

== Description ==
The rum used by Corkspur is distilled by the West Indies Rum Distillery. Cockspur blends its rum while aging it in oak barrels, and it contains forty percent alcohol by volume.

The rum won the "International Wine and Spirit Competition's" Gold Medal in 1981, 1984, and 1989.

== Sponsorship ==
Hanschell Inniss sponsored a three-year deal between 1987 and 1990 with the England and Wales Cricket Board (ECB) to sponsor the National Club Championship. This was renamed the "Cockspur Cup" for 2004.

Cockspur was the sponsor of the West Indies cricket team in 2012.
