= Sugar beet spirit =

Beet-derived spirit

Sugar beet spirit is an alternative to traditional rum, which is made from sugar cane. Regulation (EU) 2019/787 of the European Parliament dictates that ‘Rum is a spirit drink produced exclusively by the distillation of the product obtained by the alcoholic fermentation of molasses or syrup produced in the manufacture of cane sugar or of sugar-cane juice itself’. This means that spirits made from sugar beet may not legally be called rum.

Despite the legal categorization, the production process for sugar beet spirit is identical to traditional rum, only using sugar beet instead of sugar cane. The flavour is similar to rum, but without the more tropical flavours that are associated with the traditional variety, there is also significantly less sugar added after distillation, if any. Sugar beet spirit is not to be confused with rum or gin that use sugar beet as a base sugar, as these retain no characteristics of the raw ingredient in the way that rum does.

== UK distilleries ==
At present, there is only one distillery in the UK that produces sugar beet spirit, Alkemy Distillery. In 2023, Alkemy sugar beet spirit scored a 93 at the IWSC (international wine and spirits competition), making it the highest scoring rum produced in England, despite not legally being categorised as a rum. It has also won a gold medal at the 2024 Rum and Cachaca Masters competition, and a silver at the 2024 London Spirits Competition.

== European distilleries ==
Belroot Spirits is a Belgian distillery founded in 2025 that produces distilled spirits from sugar beet molasses. The company developed a production process that adapts fermentation and maturation principles inspired by traditional Jamaican rum-making techniques to locally sourced sugar beet molasses. Its proprietary method combines a specific pre-treatment, controlled fermentation, and distillation process to influence precursors and ester formation while creating a distinctive aromatic profile. The resulting spirits are produced from sugar beet molasses while exhibiting sensory characteristics commonly associated with traditional rum production. Belroot Spirits' production process is protected by a patented technology.

== Environmental impact ==
As sugar cane can only be grown in tropical climates, this means that some form of sugar, or rum itself must be imported to European markets. This results in significant carbon emissions as a result of transport for traditional rum. Sugar beet spirit is used as an alternative to traditional rum in less tropical parts of the world, such as Europe as a way of reducing these emissions.

== See also ==
- Tuzemák
