= Charanda =

Alcoholic spirit derived from sugarcane

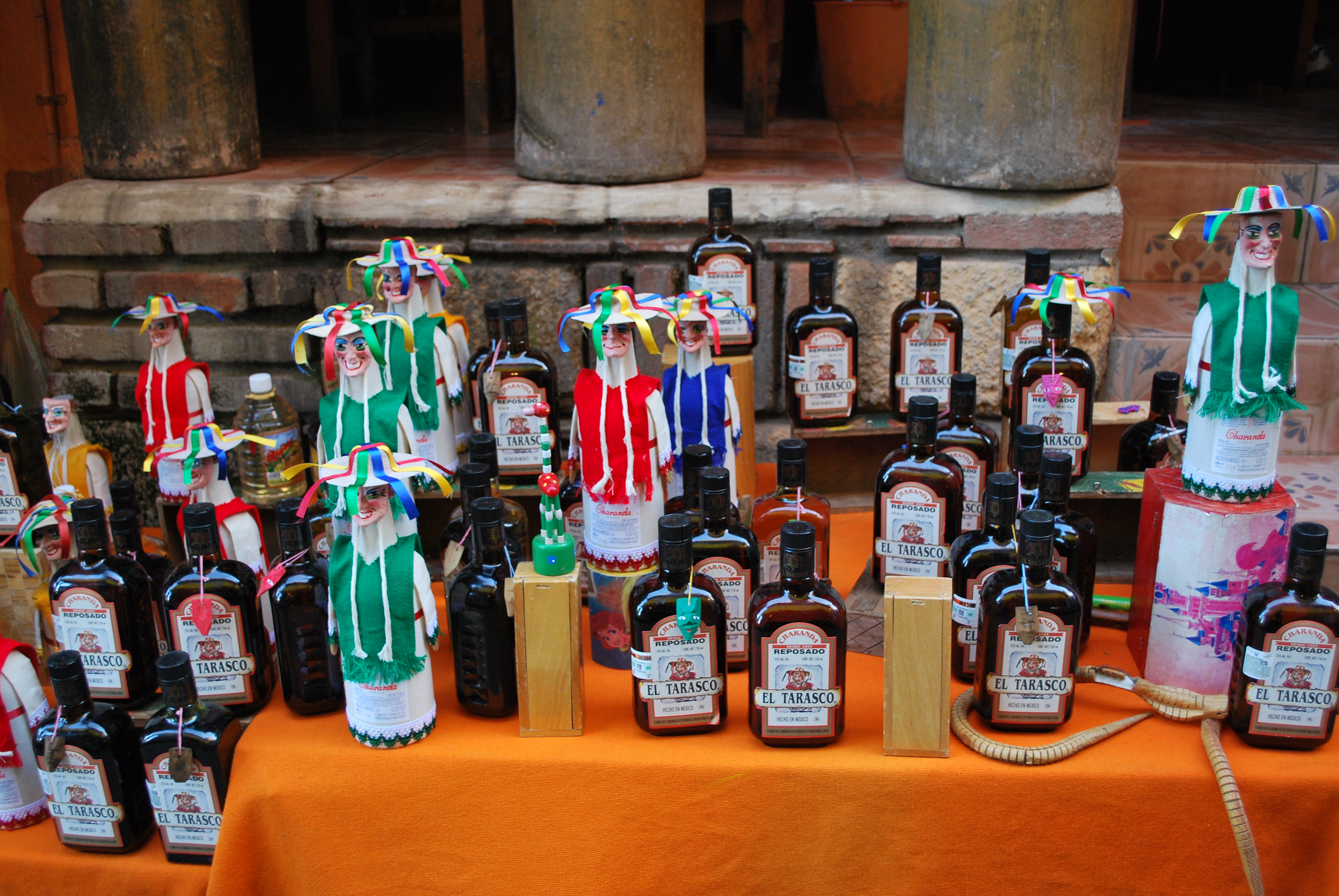
Charanda

Charanda is an alcoholic spirit derived from sugarcane, similar to rum. It is sometimes called aguardiente artisanal rum.

Typically, the beverage is associated with the central portion of the State of Michoacán in Mexico, particularly the Purépecha-populated areas near the prominently agricultural City of Uruapan. It is named after a hill range in the area called 'Cerro de la Charanda', where the first distillery was built. Charanda is a term in Purépecha language meaning 'red-colored soil'.

Obtained through the distillation and rectification (double distillation) of sugarcane cold-extracted and then fermented juices. The result is a colorless crystalline spirit. When stored and aged in oak or encino barrels, the spirit acquires hues of amber. Certain blue tonalities are seen in Premium distillations from handpicked sugarcanes when a maceration process is added. Buttery sweet in taste, similar to vanilla. It is usually served at room temperature.

Charanda was granted protection with a declaration of 'Denominación de Origen Protegida' in 2003 (in English: Protected Designation of Origin or PDO), following the norms regarding the quality of the sugarcanes used in production, the characteristics and types of the final product, and the methods of extraction and production. It also specifies the geographical region where the name of the spirit can be used for commercial purposes.

Charanda can only be produced in 16 of the 113 cities of Michoacán, a state where sugar cane grows at an elevation of 4,000 feet. However, in this state, where avocado and strawberry agriculture is a driving economic force, many farmers give up producing charanda. Over the past hundred years, the number of charanda distillers is estimated to have dropped from 80 to 6–7. The state's unfavorable political climate (cartel-controlled) also contributes to the decline of artisan entrepreneurship.

Charanda comes in many brands, just like any other distilled spirit. Some of the most popular are "Tres Extra", "Tarasco" (three varieties: Blanco, Reposado and Añejo -Premium-), and "Uruapan" (three varieties: Blanco, Plata -Premium- and Real de Uruapan -Premium-).
