= Tuzemák =

Czech distilled beverage

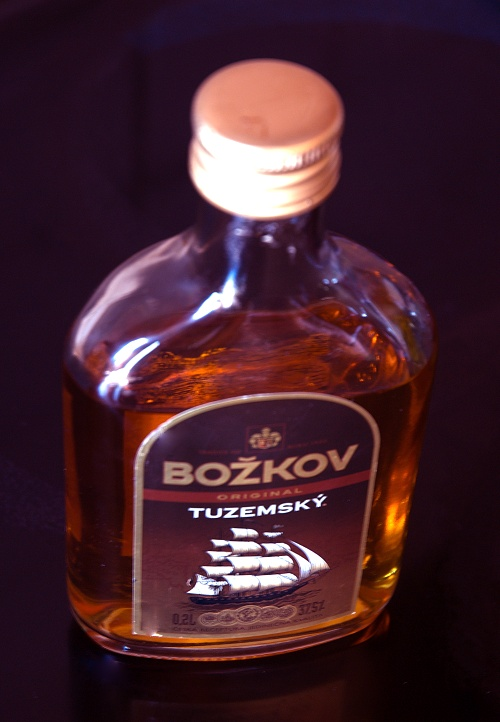
Tuzemský Božkov

Tuzemák, formerly called Tuzemský rum (English: domestic rum or potato rum), is a traditional Czech distilled beverage. It is a substitute good (ersatz) for true rum which is produced from sugarcane mainly in the Caribbean and Latin America. Since the 19th century, Tuzemák became one of the most popular spirits in the Czech lands.

Tuzemský is produced from potatoes or sugar beets, diluted and flavoured by various rum essences. In the 19th century similar substitutes were produced throughout the crown lands of the Austro-Hungarian monarchy, which had no access to tropical colonies; they were named Inländer-Rum (the best-known example of this is probably Stroh in Austria), Domači (Croatia) or Čajni (tea-rum) (Croatia), Tea-rum (Hungary) etc.

EU regulations allow the name "rum" to be applied only to products made from sugarcane. As a result, from 1 January 2003, this product is sold under other names like "Tuzemák" or "Tuzemský".

== See also ==
- Jagertee
- Stroh
