= Ramboozle =

Alcoholic beverage

Ramboozle is a popular British mid-seventeenth century alcoholic beverage, similar to rum. The drink, and its variation, rumfustian, were made by mixing eggs, ale, wine, sugar, and various spices, and then distilling. The names, both British slang, have been linked with the Romani word rum, meaning "strong" or "potent," as the drink had a high alcohol content.

== In popular culture ==
The historian and novelist Thomas Fleming mentions the rumfustian variant of ramboozle in his Revolutionary War novel Liberty Tavern, whose narrator, James Kemble, provides its recipe but notes, "This drink has gone out of style in America. If it ever returns, farewell tranquility".
