= Maison Ferrand =

French alcohol company

- Company type: Private
- Industry: Alcoholic beverages
- Founded: 1989; 37 years ago
- Founder: Alexandre Gabriel
- Headquarters: Ars-sur-Formans, Charente, France
- Products: cognac; rum; gin
- Website: maisonferrand.com

Maison Ferrand (French pronunciation: [mɛzɔ̃ fɛʁɑ̃]) is an independent French company specialized in the production and distribution of spirits worldwide. The company's products include cognac (Cognac Ferrand), rum (Planteray) and gin (Citadelle). The company's foundation is rooted in the history of the centuries-old Ferrand family from the Cognac region. Since 2017, Maison Ferrand has been the owner of the West Indies Rum Distillery (WIRD) in Barbados, and a 1/3 shareholder of the National Rum Company of Jamaica.

== History ==
=== Cognac's Ferrand family ===
The presence of the Ferrand family in the Cognac region can be traced back to 1469. Elie Ferrand was born in 1630 and gave his first name to the first-born of the following 10 generations of his family. In the early 17th century, Elie Ferrand the 6th became the owner of a vineyard, and started to produce and sell wine and spirits. The cognac made by Elie Ferrand the 8th was awarded a gold medal at the 1900 Universal Exhibition in Paris. Elie Ferrand the 10th died during World War I, and the last male of the Ferrand lineage died in 1930.

The Ferrand family house, which was built around 1860, had been the house of Henriette Ranson-Ferrand, the last descendant of the Elie Ferrand family. She had kept the entire family archives, and after her death in 2016, the house was acquired by Maison Ferrand and became the Maison Ferrand foundation.

=== Expansion to gin and rum ===
In 1989, Alexandre Gabriel and Jean Dominique Andreu acquired Pierre Ferrand's vineyard and cognac distillery in La Nérolle, Segonzac. The two founders also had access to stocks of aged Grande Champagne cognac from the neighboring Logis d’Angeac distillery. They packaged and registered the Pierre Ferrand cognac brand, and flew to the US to start sales. A decade later, Pierre Ferrand fought for the ownership of the brand but lost in court.

The German subsidiary Ferrand Deutschland GmBH was created in 2000. Distribution grew slowly in the US. In the early 2000s, cognac became a trendy drink of the hip hop community, leading to a boost in sales in the US, and mixology became a worldwide trend, giving room for smaller brands to exist through iconic drinks.

Since the distilling of cognac is seasonal, the company fought for the right to use its empty stills for other purposes, and launched the gin Citadelle, France's first craft gin, in 1996. Then in 1999, the company launched the rum brand Plantation. Jean-Dominique Andreu left Cognac Ferrand in February 2008.

In 2017, Maison Ferrand acquired its first distillery in the Caribbean, the 19th-century West Indies Rum Distillery (WIRD) in Barbados, and 1/3 of the National Rum Company of Jamaica (Clarendon and Long Pond Distilleries). In 2021, the company inaugurated a new distillery entirely dedicated to the production of Citadelle gin in Ars, Charente, and In 2023, it inaugurated the world's first floating spirits cellar in a typical Parisian barge (péniche), the Barge 166 which is moored on the Seine. Maison Ferrand bought the British distribution company Identity Drinks in July 2024 and renamed it Maison Ferrand UK. Idris Elba partnered with Maison Ferrand to produce Porte Noire Cognac.

== Description ==
Maison Ferrand is a French company specialized in the production and distribution of spirits worldwide. The company is independent and owns the following brands:

Brand	Type	Launch year
Ferrand	Cognac	1989
Citadelle	Gin	1996
Planteray (formerly Plantation)	Rum	1999
Dry Curaçao	Orange liqueur	2012

In its production process, Maison Ferrand favors the crossover of traditional distilling and aging techniques. The Planteray rum is first distilled and aged in Barbados and other rum-producing countries in Latin America, the Caribbean and Asia-Pacific, and aged a second time in Ferrand cognac barrels in France. The Ferrand Renegade collection is cognac aged in rum barrels. Maison Ferrand owns commercial subsidiaries in the USA, Germany and the UK. Maison Ferrand is owned by Alexandre Gabriel, who founded the company and later developed its gin and rum activities (including WIRD ownership in Barbados). He is the master blender of the company and heads the Maison Ferrand foundation dedicated to studying the history of rum and cognac.

== Foundation ==
The Maison Ferrand foundation was launched in 2016 to study and preserve the intangible cultural heritage of cognac and rum. The foundation is located in the historic house of the Ferrand family, the Manoir de Mademoiselle, in Segonzac, Charente.

The foundation published the following books:

- Blanc, Jacques (2018). Ellie Ferrand VIII, the Life and Times of an Enlightened Cognac Farmer.
- Blanc, Jacques; Gabriel, Alexandre (2020). History of Grande Champagne de Cognac. Fondation Ferrand Collection.
- Gabriel, Alexandre; Pietrek, Matt (2024). Exploring 300 Years of Royal Navy Rum and its Techniques. ISBN 979-8-218-44823-3.
