= Stroh =

Austrian manufacturer of rum

STROH Austria GmbH
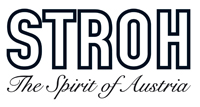
- Industry: Distilled beverage
- Founded: 1832
- Headquarters: Klagenfurt, Austria
- Key people: CEO Harold Burstein
- Products: Rum
- Revenue: €11.8 million
- Number of employees: 35
- Website: www.stroh.at

Stroh Austria GmbH (Austrian German: [ʃtroː]) is an Austrian manufacturer of liquors, especially spiced rums and high-proof rum-like drinks used in warm drinks and cooking. The Stroh brand is one of the best-known spirits from Austria.

The term Stroh Rum has colloquially become a genericized trademark for spirits with a similarly high alcohol content in Germanic speaking regions.

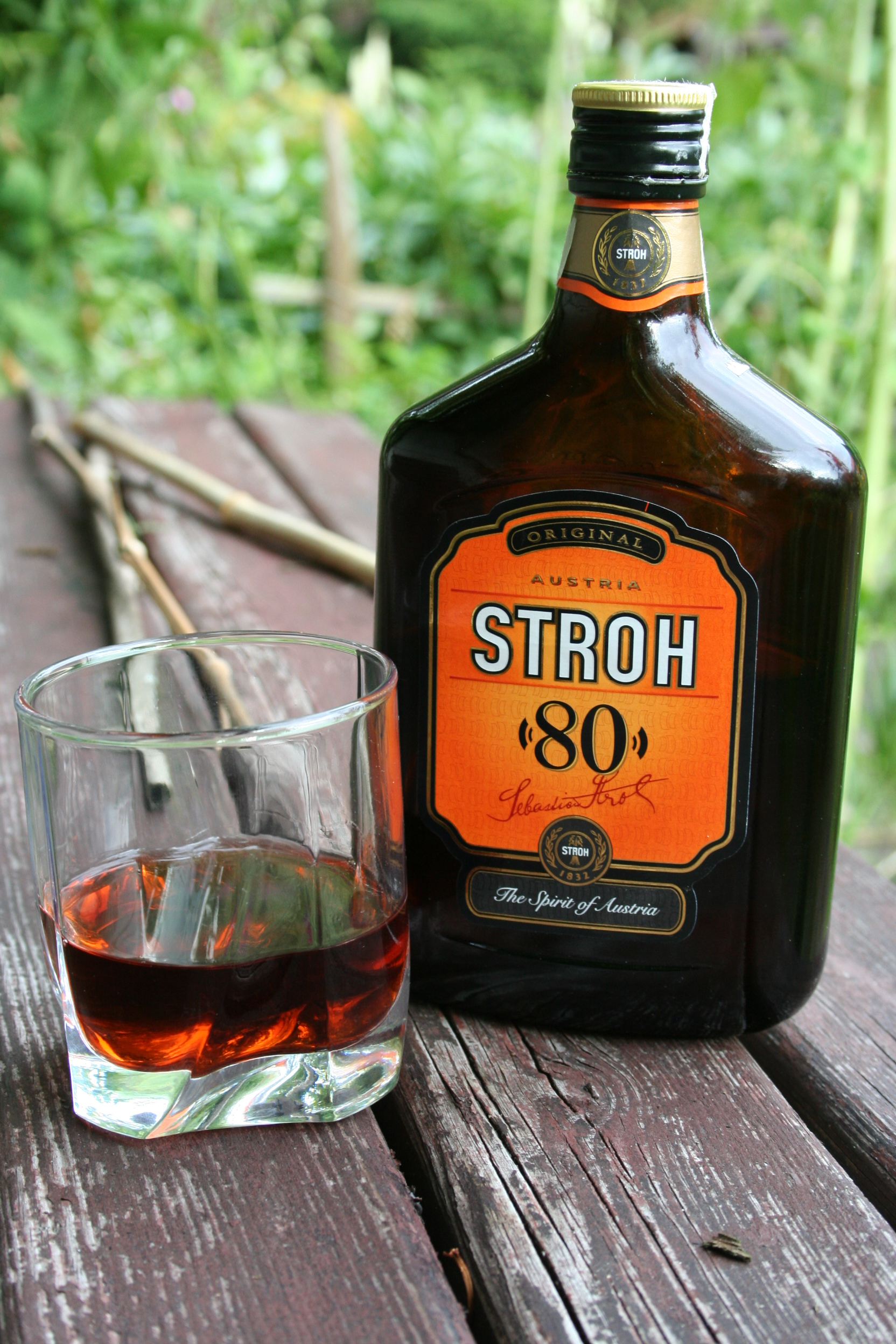
Stroh 80 (ABV); labeled Stroh 160 (proof) U.S.

== Background ==
As Austria-Hungary had no colonies in tropical regions with rum or easy access to rum importation, the imperial government regulated the manufacturing of a rum-like product, where the sugarcane molasses aroma was replaced with a mixture of flavorants and coloring added to alcohol from sugar beets. This class of products was named Inländer-Rum (literally "domestic rum"). It resulted in a distinctive product smelling primarily of butterscotch and vanilla. It became a regional specialty, available from several brands, in the countries that followed the collapse of the Austro-Hungarian Empire, most notably today's Austria and the Czech Republic.

Some manufacturers have since switched to using sugarcane by-products according to European Community regulations, while the typical "Inländer" flavor is provided by traditional essences. So the result can be regarded equal to a spiced rum. The product designation for Inländer Rum is no longer standardised in the Codex Alimentarius Austriacus.

== Company history ==
In 1832, Sebastian/Boštijan Stroh founded a small distillery in St. Paul (Carinthian Lavanttal). His widow, Maria Stroh, continued the business with production facilities at Karfreitstrasse 18 in Klagenfurt. By 1857 the company had expanded into large-scale liqueur and brandy manufacturing. Stroh became one of the dominant brands of Inländer Rum. At the 1900 Exposition Universelle in Paris the product was awarded a gold medal.

The company is still privately held by Austrian owners.

== Product line ==
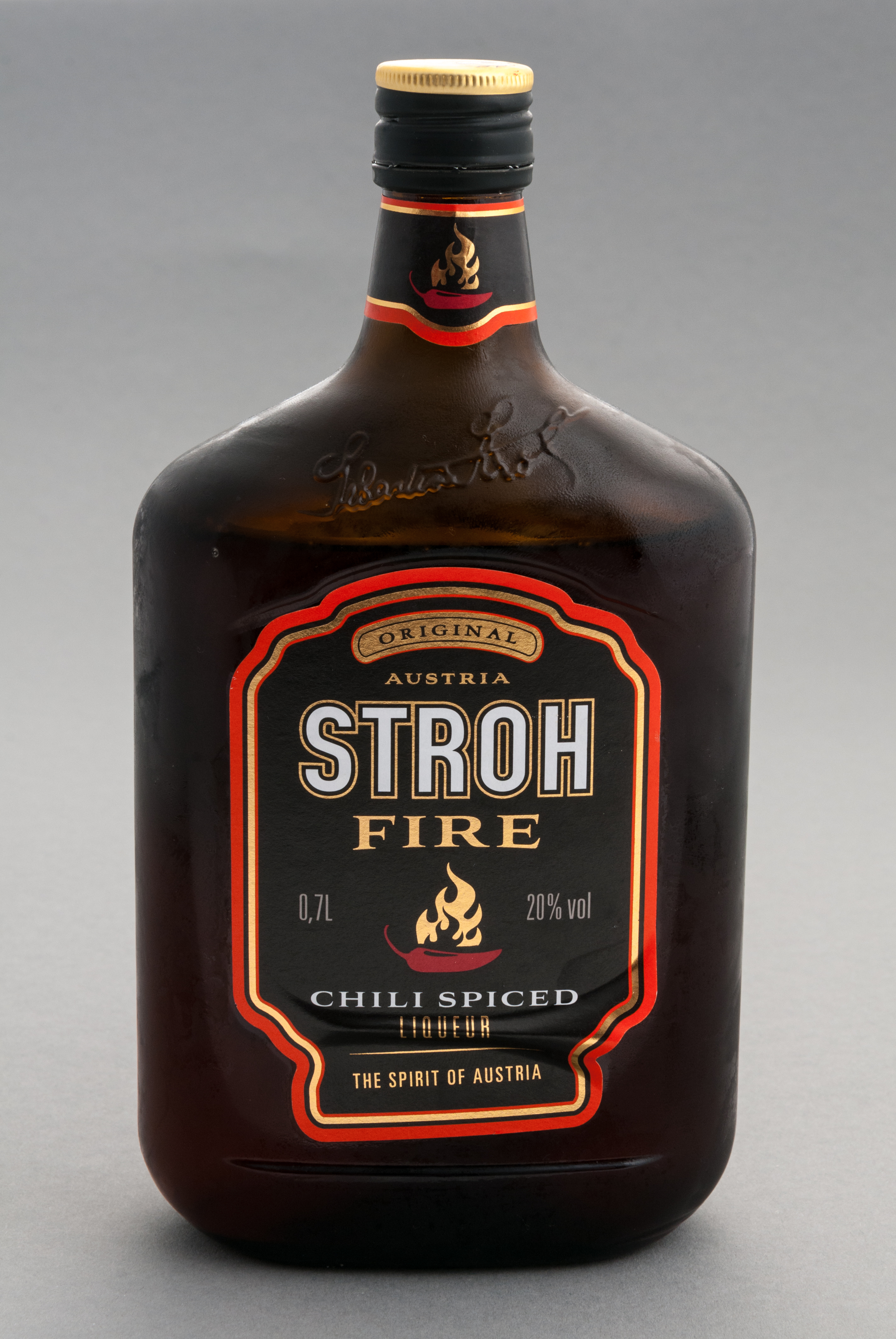
Stroh Fire (chili spiced)

The company is best known for its flagship product, Stroh, The Spirit of Austria, and its bottled hunter's punch Jagertee, which is typically drunk warm and is served at ski resorts. Stroh has also made other packaged liquor products that are mostly available only in Europe, including Stroh Punsch, Stroh Cream, Stroh Fire and Stroh Cola.

In the United States Stroh is known for its unusually high alcohol content, with the version most readily available there being 160 proof and frequently labeled as Stroh 160 (labeled as Stroh 80 in Europe). In Europe it is available in five variants: Stroh 38, Stroh 40, Stroh 54, Stroh 60 and Stroh 80 (representing alcohol by volume and corresponding to 76, 80, 108, 120 and 160 proof (US) respectively).

Stroh products are internationally sold and are available in more than 40 countries.

== Product use ==
Exports to Germany, Scandinavia, and Benelux account for about two-thirds of the company's sales.

The overproof rum-like product is seldom drunk neat and most commonly used in cooking or for mixing in homemade Jagertee or other warm punches (including in Feuerzangenbowle, or mixed with hot tea, honey, and butter). Because of its flammability it is used for lighting drinks on fire, such as the Flaming B-52, or in strong cocktails such as the Von Tiki. A lower proof product version is packaged and sold in small syrup containers for soaking waffles.

Stroh is a common household and commercially important ingredient in the making of syrups, cake frostings, pastries, and other desserts in Austrian cuisine due to its sweet flavor and strong butterscotch and vanilla aromatic notes. An example is in preparation of rumtopf, a fruit based compote, and rum prune cake. It is also an ingredient in Bananas Foster variations, although less of the alcohol should be used.

The company has licensed the name for the spirit to be used by Walter Heindl GmbH in confectionary products such as Stroh Pralinen and Stroh flavored chocolate balls.

== Product packaging ==
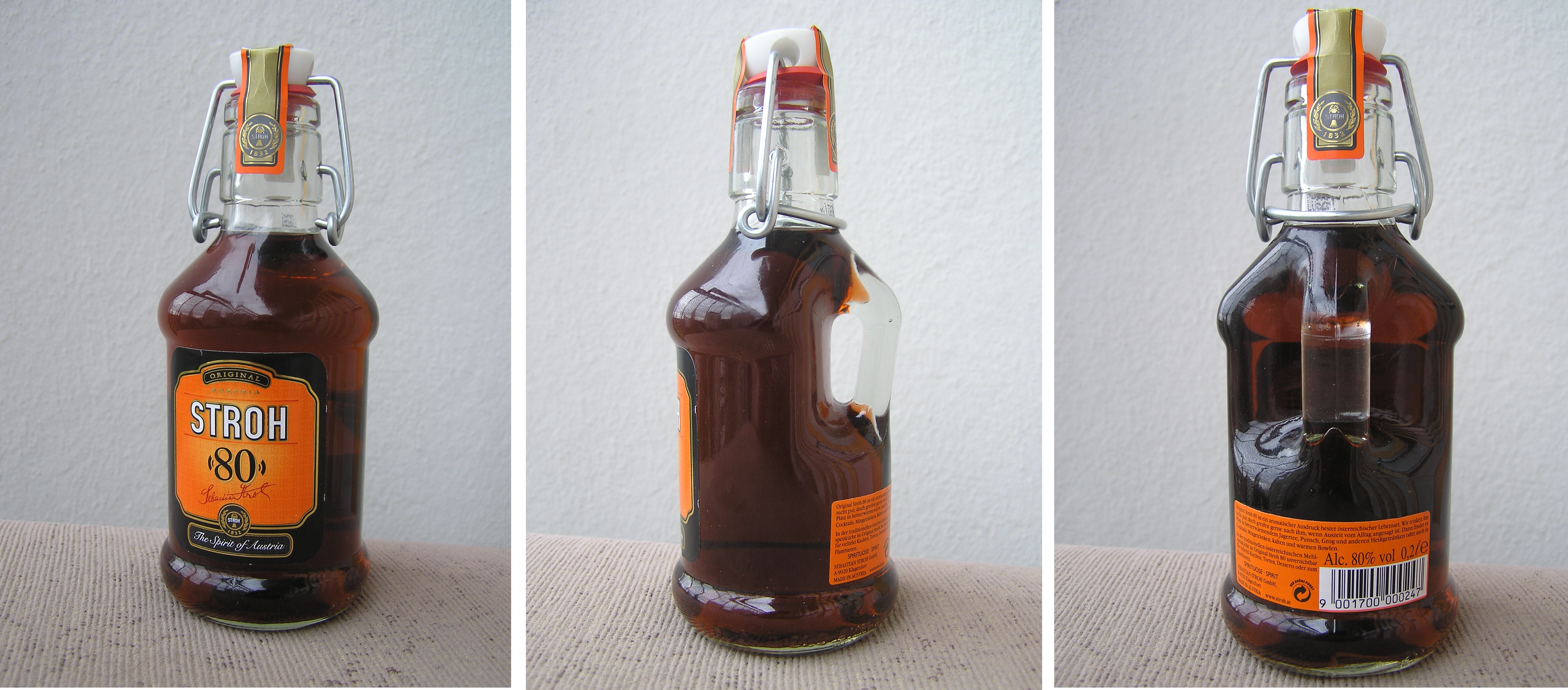
Stroh 80 in a 0.2 L (6.8 U.S. fl oz; 7.0 imp fl oz) swing top bottle

Stroh is packaged in brown glass bottles meant to emulate the hip flasks worn by hunters and others in the countryside during winter. Playing to its historic roots, some products are also packaged in larger jugs employing swing-top rubber stoppers. Other variations include Stroh in syrup containers, mini-bottles, and cans.

== See also ==
- Jägertee
- Tuzemák
