= Tafia =

Alcoholic beverage

Tafia (also called guildive) is a drink similar to rum made from sugarcane juice. It is typically unaged whereas rum is typically aged in wooden barrels to reduce the level of fusel. Most of the fusel is absorbed in the first two years. Premium rums are aged for a longer period, incidentally increasing the evaporation of ethanol.

== Etymology ==
The word tafia is possibly an alteration of ratafia via aphesis.

Whereas guildive, a word of the West Indies, is a corruption from the English kill-devil (presumably through a spoken pronunciation, kill-div'l) and is one of various names of tafia in 1799 by Nemnich Universal European Dictionary of Merchandise; also, Dutch: keel duivel, Danish: geldyvel, French: gueldive.

Guildive or "inferior rum" is a word that was introduced into the dictionnaire de l'Académie française in 1762.

== Rum and tafia ==
The history of rum and tafia dates back to the 17th century. Both originated on vast sugar plantations in Haiti. This is in dispute some sources attribute it to Barbados. In the colonial era, the rum trade became very lucrative and rum production was a major source of the demand for slaves, who were needed to produce sugar cane. In 18th century Louisiana, sugar was grown more for households and local needs, not as an export crop, although it was used to make tafia for local consumption. Clairin is an analogous spirit produced in Haiti.

Often, both tafia and rum were produced. Tafia is a kind of rum mostly for local consumption, as it is easier and cheaper to make. Rum took more time, effort, and resources to produce, but it was a more profitable product that could be shipped to distant markets, because it refined the taste.

In the making of rum, the juice from sugarcane is boiled down to syrup. This syrup is briskly stirred until crystals form. When the crystal layer is removed, the remainder — molasses — is boiled again and water and yeast are added to the molasses and water mixture and allowed to ferment. Rum made directly from cane juice is known as rhum agricole. The fermented mixture is then distilled. The distilled product is colorless until it is aged in wooden barrels and other natural ingredients like caramel are added.
