= Citadelle (gin) =

French brand of gin

- Type: Gin
- Manufacturer: Maison Ferrand
- Origin: France
- Introduced: 1996
- Variants: Permanent: Original; Jardin d'été; Rouge; Old Tom; Zéro; Limited: Cornichon; Thé French
- Related products: List of gins
- Website: citadellegin.com

Citadelle is a gin produced in France by Maison Ferrand. Launched in 1996, it pioneered the production of craft gin. Open to the public, its distillery is located in the historic Château de Bonbonnet in Ars, near Cognac. Citadelle is distilled in copper pot stills with a proprietary "progressive infusion" distillation method.

== History ==
The gin Citadelle was created by the founders of the Cognac Ferrand (Maison Ferrand). Since the distilling of cognac is seasonal, the company fought for the right to use its dormant off-season to produce gin. The gin Citadelle was launched in 1996, becoming France's first craft gin.

Gin and tonic was not widely associated with the finer cocktail category until Spanish chef Ferran Adrià popularized it by declaring Gin and tonic a gastronomic act on TV in 1998, and mentioning Citadelle as the perfect base for the cocktail.

In 2022, Citadelle launched its limited editions, Les Excentriques, starting with a cornichon-infused gin. In 2026, Citadelle launched its zero-alcohol variant Citadelle Zero achieved through hydrodistillation.

== Description ==
Citadelle gin is produced in the Cognac region in France by Maison Ferrand. The gin is distilled in copper pot stills, putting Citadelle in a stand-alone category of gins. Citadelle's botanicals include liquorice, angelica root, coriander, cubeb, cardamon, cumin, violet root, and grains of paradise. The New York Times described it as "highly complex, deep gin with floral, spicy and even earthy undertones", and Master of Malt as "complex, intriguing and well-integrated". Citadelle's "progressive infusion" distillation method is patented.

Citadelle produces the following variants:

- Permanent: • Original • Jardin d'éte • Rouge • Old Tom • Zéro (0% alcohol)
- Limited: • Cornichon • Thé French • Maisonette

== Distillery ==
Citadelle's distillery is located in the Château de Bonbonnet in Ars, France. The distillery grows its own juniper berries (Juniperus communis). The distillery includes an orangery, a Spice Room, and 10 stills dating back to the 1800s. Citadelle distillers experiment with new savors such as Sichuan peppers gin and cornichon pickles gin. Alexandre Gabriel is the Master blender of Citadelle gin at Maison Ferrand.

== Awards ==
- Double gold medal at the San Francisco World and Spirits Competition.
- 2025: World Drinks awards 2025 (delivered by Paragraph Publishing) in the category "best touristic attraction worldwide"
- 2025: Master Medal at the Gin Masters by The Spirits Business
