= West Indies Rum Distillery =

Distillery company from Barbados

- Location: Blackrock, Barbados
- Owner: Maison Ferrand
- Founded: 1893
- Founder: George Stade
- No. of stills: 3 colum stills 3 pot stills 1 chamber still

Stade's Rum
- Type: Molasses and cane juice
- Age(s): Fresh to 12 years
- Cask type(s): Bourbon and Sherry

Planteray
- Type: Molasses and cane juice
- Age(s): 5, 8, 12, 15, 20 years
- Cask type(s): Bourbon and Cognac

The West Indies Rum Distillery (WIRD), also known as Stade's Rum Distillery, is located in Blackrock, Barbados. It was established in 1893 by George Stade. The distillery produces its own rum brands, as well as rum for other brands. Maison Ferrand acquired the distillery in 2017.

== History ==
=== Development since 1893 ===
The West India Rum Refinery was built by the distiller George Stade in 1893. It was the island's first column still, and was erected on the beach, away from sugar cane plantations, a unique configuration at the time. Its initial purpose was to distill sugar cane for local rum producers. It became a public company in 1901.

The West India Rum Refinery produced the rum Cockspur since its launch in the early 20th century. In 1939 (or 1965), Goddard Enterprises Limited (GEL, also owner of Cockspur) bought a participation in West India Rum Refinery Limited, and turned it into a controlling stake (88%) in 1989.

It was renamed West Indies Rum Distillery in 1994, and Malibu became its largest customer during the 1990s. In 2006, the WIRD acquired 33,3% of the National Rums of Jamaica (Clarendon, Long Pond and Innswood distilleries), an important Jamaican rum producer. By 2010, the WIRD mainly provided rum to Diageo and Pernod Ricard.

=== Maison Ferrand since 2017 ===
Maison Ferrand had been a client of the West Indies Rum Distillery since the early 2000s, sourcing rum for its Planteray brand (formerly Plantation), which is then double-aged a second time around in France. In 2017, Maison Ferrand acquired the West Indies Rum Distillery and its one-third ownership of National Rums of Jamaica (including Clarendon and Long Pond distilleries).

The new owner reshuffled distribution to focus on exclusive clients. In 2021, the distillery launched its own brand of rum, Stade's Rum. The WIRD opened the Harper Sugarcane Mill dedicated to sugarcane and rum research in 2022, and worked with the Caribbean Agricultural Research and Development Institute (CARDI) to launch a coconut-flavored rum using only Barbados-grown coconuts.

== Description ==
The West Indies Rum Distillery is a rum distillery located in Blackrock, Barbados, and owned by Maison Ferrand. The WIRD also owns 33.3% of National Rums of Jamaica (Clarendon and Long Pond distilleries). It produces its own brands of rums, provides rum for other brands, and its production accounts for around 85% of Barbados' rum. It was labeled Bonsucro (sustainable cane sugar) in 2021.

The distillery has four pot stills: the Gregg's Farm, the Hot Pot (active since 2020), the Vulcan, and the Rockley (built in 1780 and reconditioned in 2023). The master blender is Don Benn.

== Gallery ==
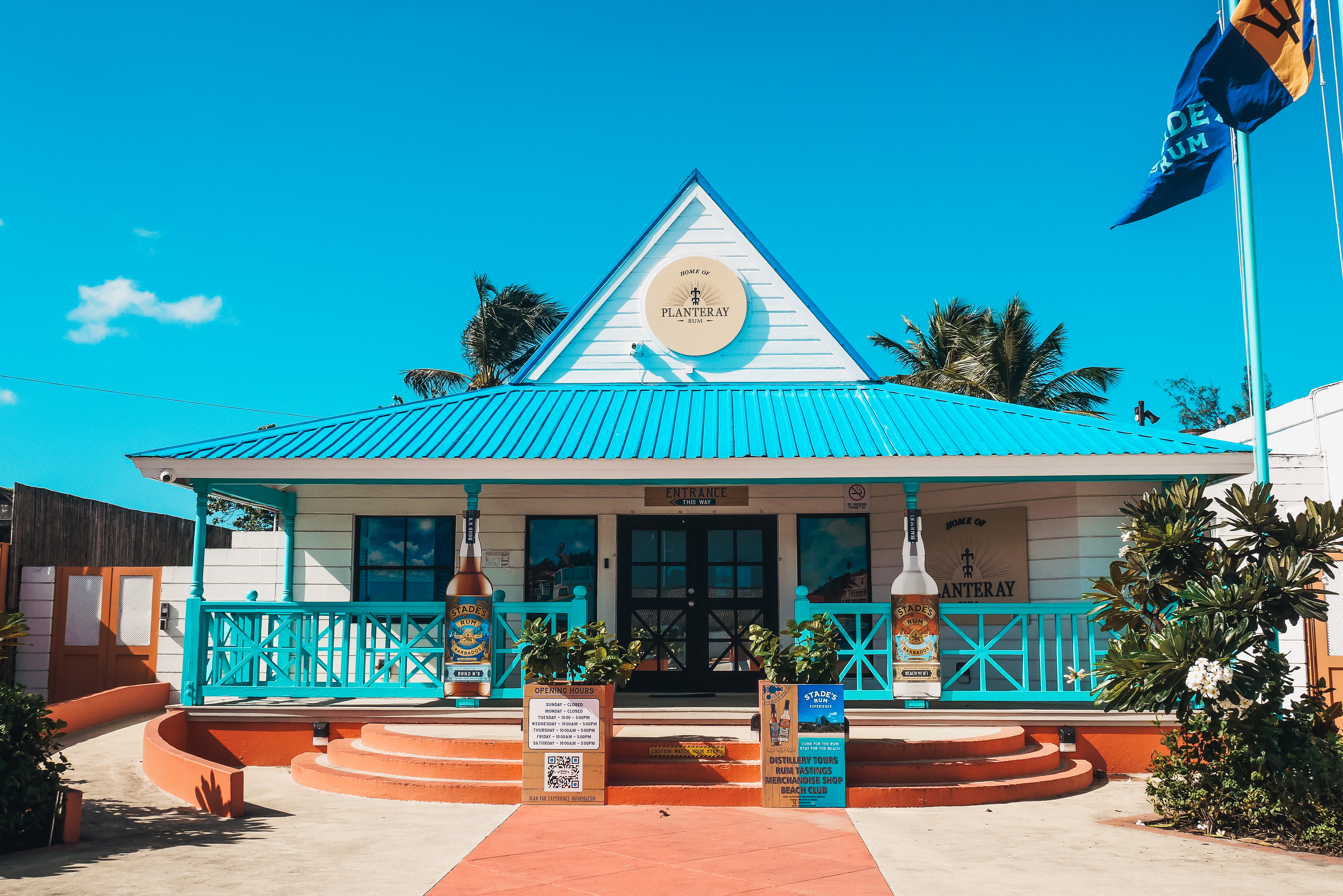
Visitors center.

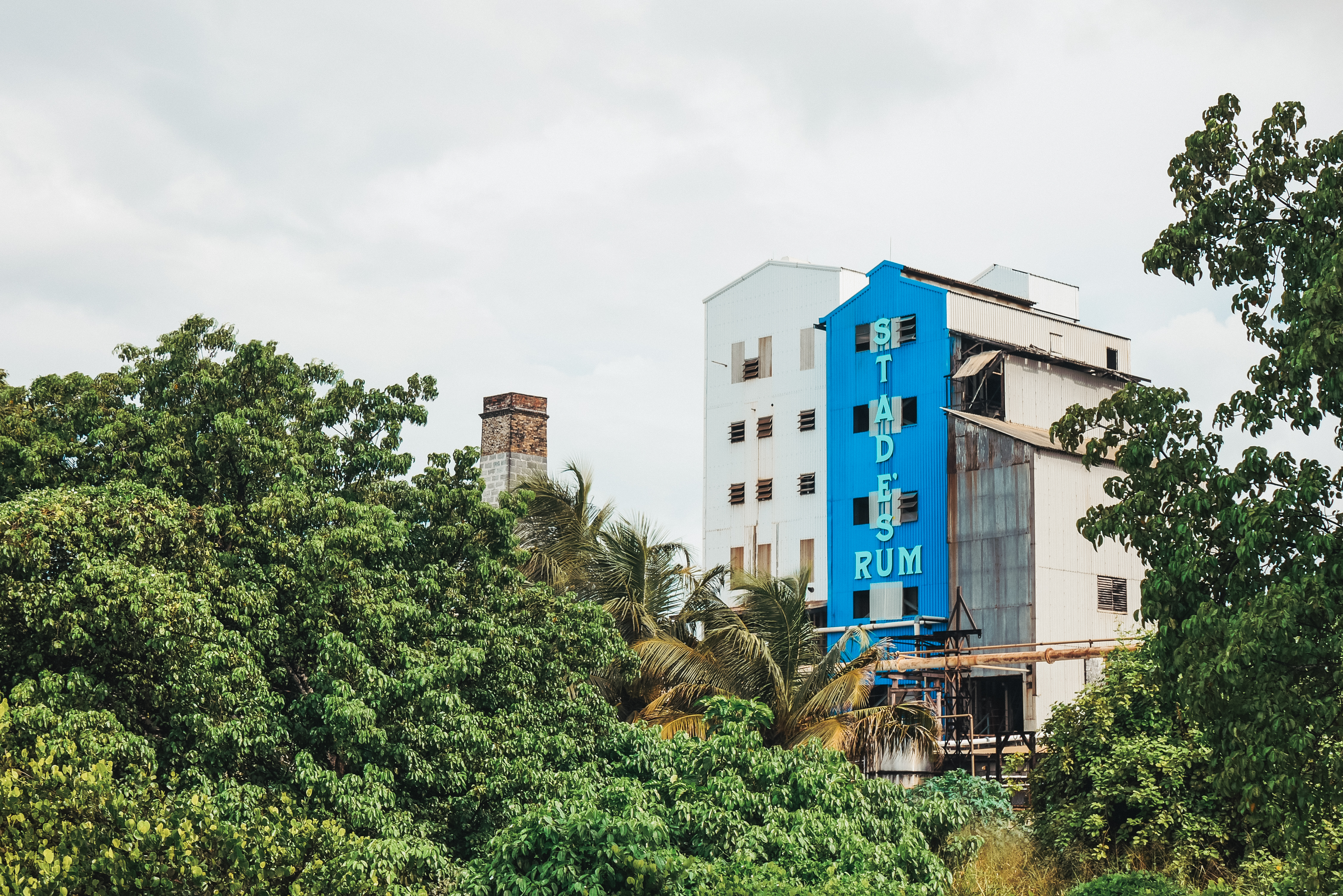
Distillery tower.

== See also ==
- List of rum brands
- List of companies of Barbados
