= Jagertee =

Alcoholic beverage

Jagertee (also Jägertee) is an alcoholic punch historically made by mixing "Inländer-Rum" with spiced black tea. It is served warm and is typically consumed during winter in the cold parts of Central Europe.

Although Jagertee is easily made at home, ready-made mixtures which already contain spices and sugar are sold in shops. Often Stroh brand liquor is used for making it; this company also sells its own ready-made variety.

Jagertee has become a popular après-ski drink, especially among tourists in the Alps. Jagertee carts sell the beverage outside at ski resorts and winter festivals.

== Etymology ==
The name Jagertee (alternatively Jagatee or Jägertee) is derived from the Austro-Bavarian pronunciation of the standard German Jäger "hunter" + Tee "tea". According to EC Regulation 110/2008, Annex III, No. 32, it is a Protected Designation of Origin reserved for the beverage made in Austria. Therefore, varieties made in Germany are sold under names like Hüttentee ("hut tea") or Förstertee ("forester tea"). It has also been sold under the name of Grog in the Czech Republic and Slovakia.

Some rural establishments also serve Wilderertee ("poacher's tea"), which is even stronger.

== See also ==
- Mulled wine
- Glühwein
- Punch
- Stroh
- Gunfire
