= Croizet =

French cognac house founded in 1805

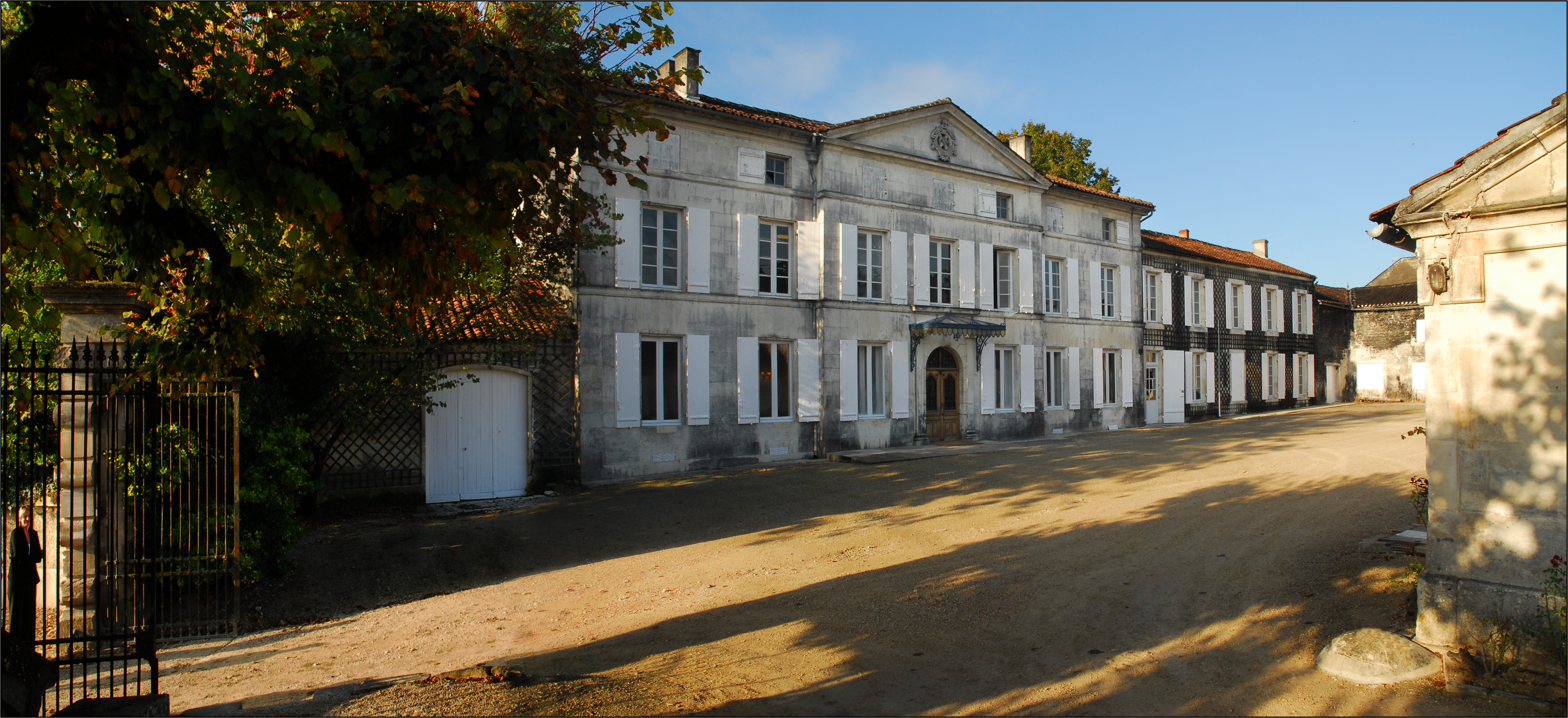
- The Croizet headquarters at Saint-Même-les-Carrières, built between c. 1850 and 1880 in dressed Santonian-stage limestone
- Type: SAS
- Industry: Cognac production
- Founded: 1805
- Founder: Simon Croizet
- Headquarters: 9 rue du Dorland, Saint-Même-les-Carrières, France
- Area served: Worldwide
- Key people: Marina Roy (MD)
- Products: Cognac, Brandy, Liqueurs
- Website: croizet.fr
- Footnotes; SIREN: 905420147

Croizet is a French cognac house based in Saint-Même-les-Carrières, in the Grande Champagne premier cru of the Cognac appellation d'origine contrôlée. Founded in 1805 by Simon Croizet (1786–1854), the house is particularly noted for its association with Léon Benjamin Croizet (1842–1911), who spearheaded efforts to reconstitute the vineyards of the Cognac region during the phylloxera crisis and was appointed Chevalier of the Legion of Honour in 1902.

For eight generations, the house was family-owned—first by the Croizet family and subsequently by the Eymard family—before its acquisition in 2007 by the Russian Wine Trust. The estate encompasses vineyards predominantly within the Grande Champagne region, and its historic headquarters and cellars are housed within a network of former Turonian limestone quarries, providing optimal conditions for extended spirit maturation.

The house is highly regarded for its continuous records and maintenance of vintage-dated cognac (cognac millésimé). The oldest expression in its current range, the Cuvée Léonie 1858, has been associated with three Guinness World Records: the most expensive cognac sold at auction in 2011 (a record subsequently surpassed), the most expensive cocktail (2013), and the most expensive shot of cognac in 2016 (surpassed in 2018).

== History ==
=== Founding and early years (1805–1870s) ===
The Croizet cognac house was established in 1805 in Saint-Même-les-Carrières, a commune within the Grande Champagne growing area. This district is classified as the premier cru among the six designated crus of the Cognac appellation d'origine contrôlée, a classification originating with the geological survey by Henri Coquand in the 1860s and formalised by a decree of 13 January 1938. Saint-Même-les-Carrières had been a centre of limestone quarrying since the Middle Ages, and several cognac producers established cellars there, using the deep underground quarry galleries for spirit ageing.

The founder, Simon Croizet (28 September 1786 – 22 March 1854), belonged to a family of vineyard owners in Grande Champagne. The Syndicat des Maisons de Cognac describes him as a former sommelier attached to Napoleon I's Haut Commandement. He served as mayor of Saint-Même-les-Carrières from 1843 to 1847.

The founding date of 1805 is cited in cognac reference works including Nicholas Faith's Classic Brandy (2001) and Conal R. Gregory's The Cognac Companion (1997). The Croizet trademark was first registered in 1871, following French trademark legislation enacted on 23 June 1857.

=== Léon Benjamin Croizet and the phylloxera crisis (1870s–1911) ===
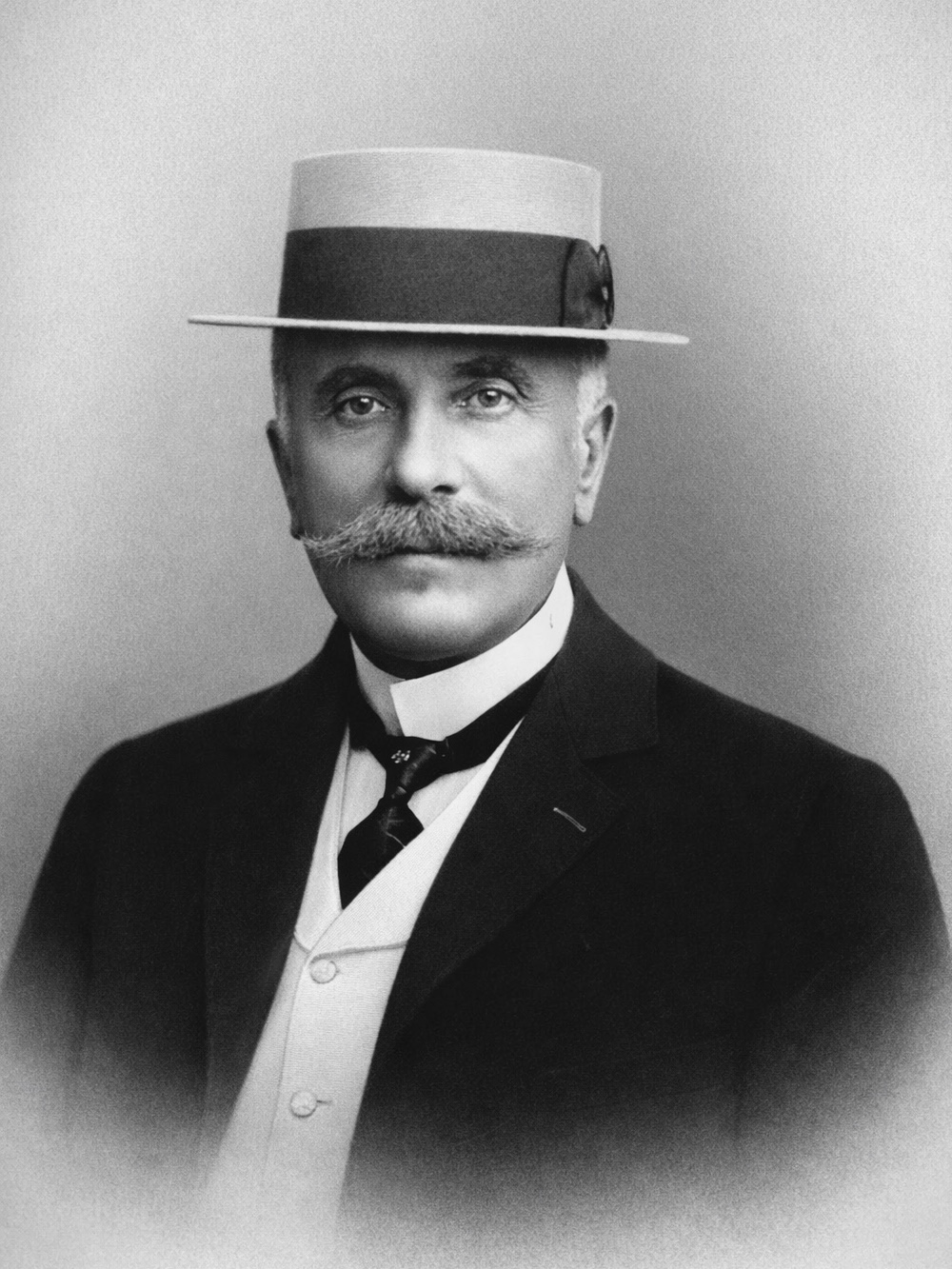
Léon Benjamin Croizet (1842–1911)

The phylloxera epidemic, caused by the root-feeding insect Daktulosphaira vitifoliae, devastated the vineyards of the Cognac region from the late 1860s, ultimately destroying an estimated 280,000 ha (690,000 acres) of vines in Charente and Charente-Maritime. The primary remedy—grafting European Vitis vinifera varieties onto resistant American rootstocks—was especially challenging in Grande Champagne, where the calcium carbonate-rich, chalky soils caused chlorosis in many American vine species.

==== Vineyard reconstitution ====
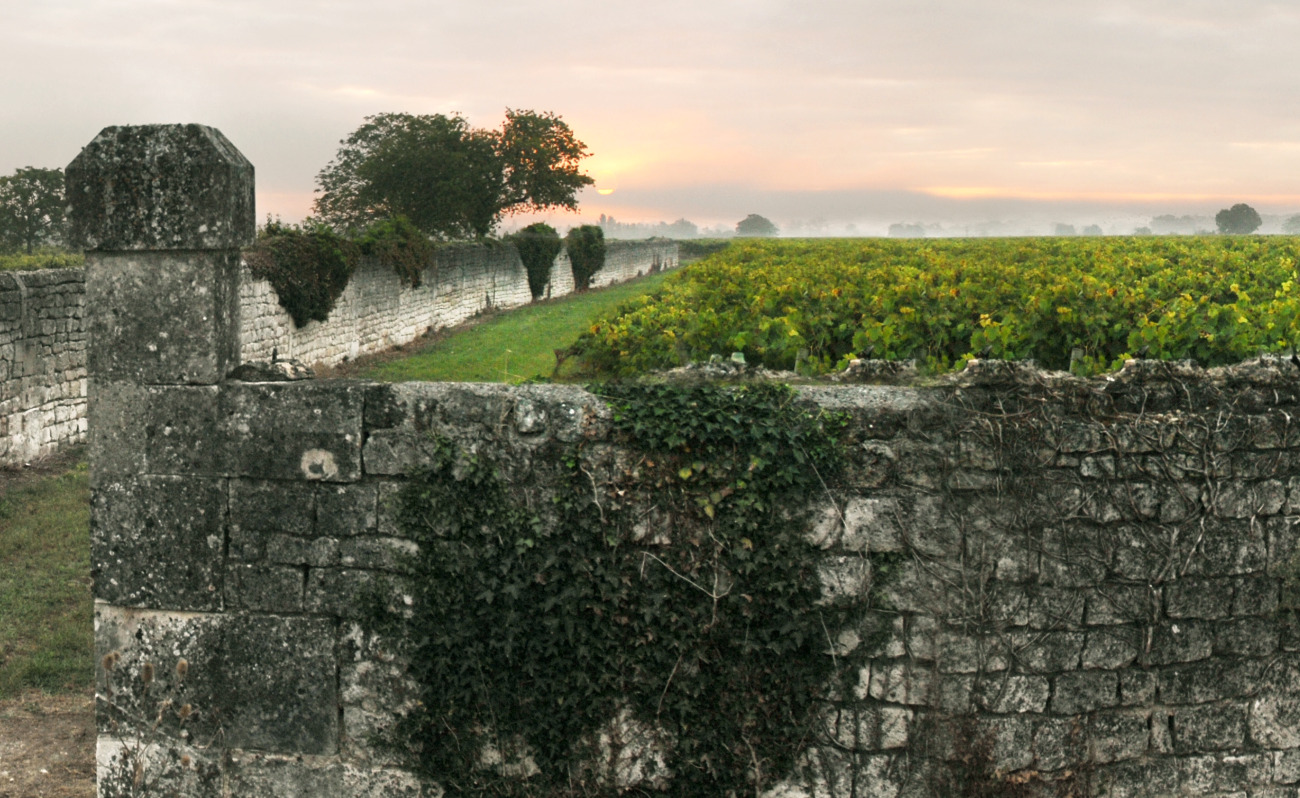
Stone walls of the clos at the Croizet estate, documented by the Société d'Horticulture et de Viticulture de la Charente (1888–1891)

Léon Benjamin Croizet (27 June 1842 – 3 March 1911), (Note: His birth certificate in the Légion d'Honneur dossier (LH/633/12) records his given names as Léon Benjamin. The 1900 hors concours diploma uses the initials "P.-B.-Léon Croizet".) born in Champmillon (now part of Val-de-Bonnieure), led the family firm from the 1870s. He proactively began observing and experimenting with vines in 1871, well before the crisis severely impacted the Charente region between 1877 and 1880. He undertook a rigorous programme of vineyard reconstitution using grafted vines on the limestone soils of Grande Champagne, eventually establishing a public experimental field in 1883 to disseminate his findings. Louis Ravaz (1863–1937), professor of viticulture at the École nationale supérieure agronomique de Montpellier, documented Croizet's contribution in Le Pays du Cognac (1900), writing that his experimental work had « certainement contribué à la sélection des cépages porte-greffes et, par suite, à la reconstitution du vignoble charentais » ("certainly contributed to the selection of rootstock varieties and, consequently, to the reconstitution of the Charentais vineyard").

The experimental vineyards established by Léon Benjamin Croizet were organised as enclosed plots known as clos—walled vineyard enclosures, a practice more commonly associated with Burgundy than with the Cognac region. A commission of the Société d'Horticulture et de Viticulture de la Charente visited the estate on multiple occasions between 1888 and 1891. In its report on the visit of 20 September 1891, the commission described the vineyard as comprising two clos totalling approximately 8 ha (20 acres), planted with grafted vines on Riparia, Solonis, Jacquez, and Rupestris rootstocks and including varieties such as Folle blanche, Jurançon, Merlot, Cabernet Sauvignon, and Saint-Émilion (Ugni blanc). (Note: The commission reports are preserved in the Journal de la Société d'Horticulture et de Viticulture de la Charente: the visit of 30 September 1888 (pp. 17–21), the visit of 14 September 1890 (pp. 43–45), and the visit of 20 September 1891 (pp. 52–53).) The commission praised the results, noting that each vine bore 10 to 15 kilograms of fully ripened grapes, and expressed the hope that other proprietors would follow Croizet's example. Notably, the commission reported that Folle blanche—a historic grape variety essential for fine cognac—thrived on the reconstituted estate, describing a half-hectare of old Folle blanche vines on American rootstocks as being of "admirable beauty" (« d'une beauté admirable »).

Léon Benjamin Croizet was appointed Chevalier of the Legion of Honour by decree of 23 February 1902, on the report of the Minister of Agriculture. His dossier (LH/633/12), preserved in the Base Léonore database maintained by the Archives nationales, includes a typed résumé des services in which Croizet stated that from 1880 he was "the first and only person who [...] actively undertook the reconstitution of the vineyard through the use of grafted American plants". The Ministry of Agriculture's official characterisation, recorded in the same dossier, describes Croizet as « l'initiateur, le propagateur, le vulgarisateur de l'œuvre de reconstitution du Vignoble Charentais, et a de ce chef rendu les plus grands services à son pays » ("the initiator, propagator, and populariser of the work of reconstitution of the Charentais vineyard, and has on this account rendered the greatest services to his country"). Like his grandfather Simon, Léon Benjamin served as mayor of Saint-Même-les-Carrières (1904–1911). The office was subsequently held by his son, Léon Émile René, from 1911 to 1919, marking three generations of civic leadership by the family.

Léon Benjamin Croizet expanded the estate by acquiring the ruins of the Château de Saint-Même in 1884 and the Logis de Flaville in the neighbouring commune of Bonneuil in 1889. A vintage advertising label reproduced in Faith's Classic Brandy (2001) shows the firm trading as "B. Léon Croizet, Propriétaire Viticulteur, à St Même près Cognac" and advertising "Vignobles entièrement reconstitués aux Châteaux de St Même et de Flaville, Grande Champagne", indicating that the reconstituted vineyards were used as a commercial distinction.

==== Exhibition awards ====
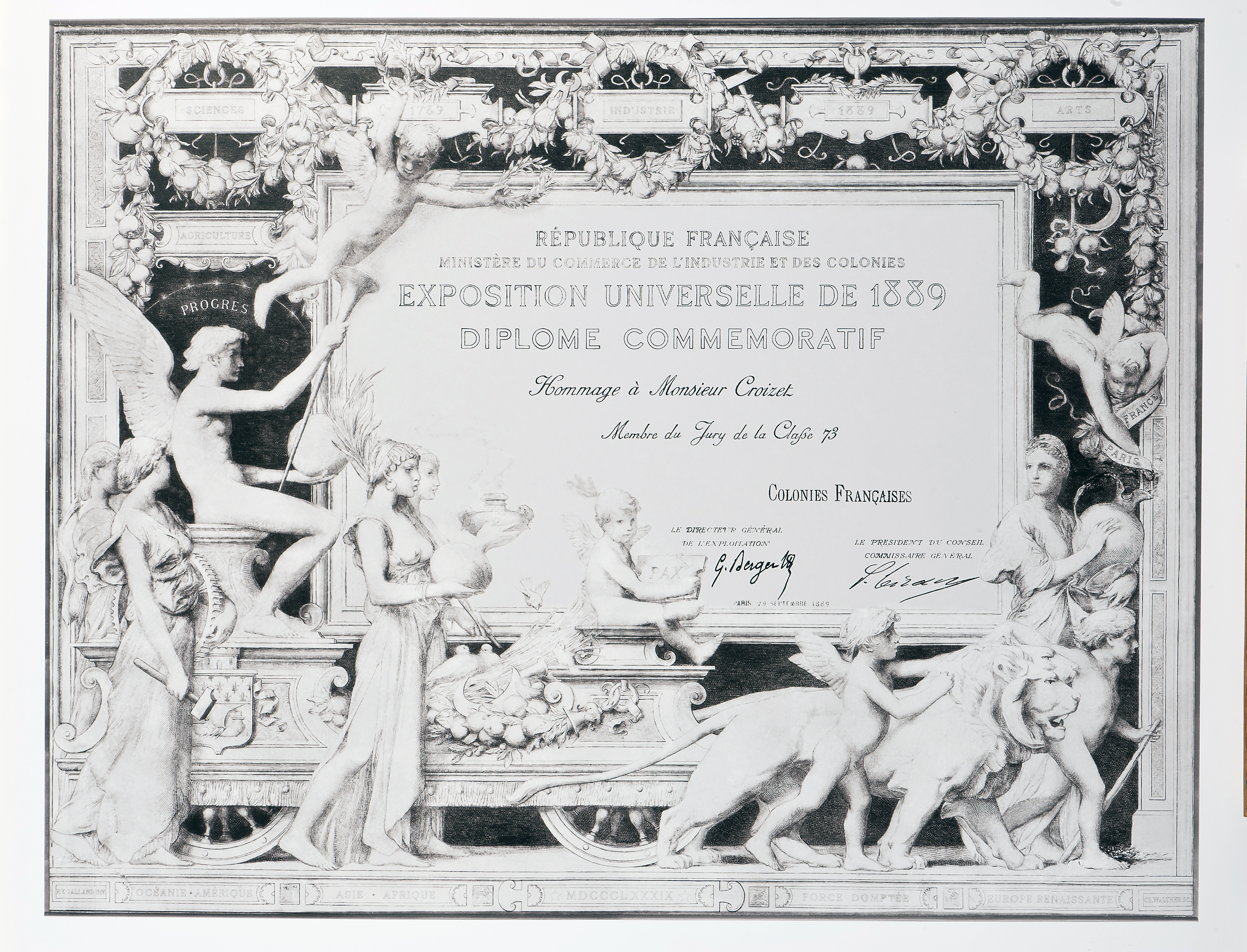
Commemorative diploma awarded to Croizet as jury member (Classe 73) at the 1889 Paris Exposition Universelle

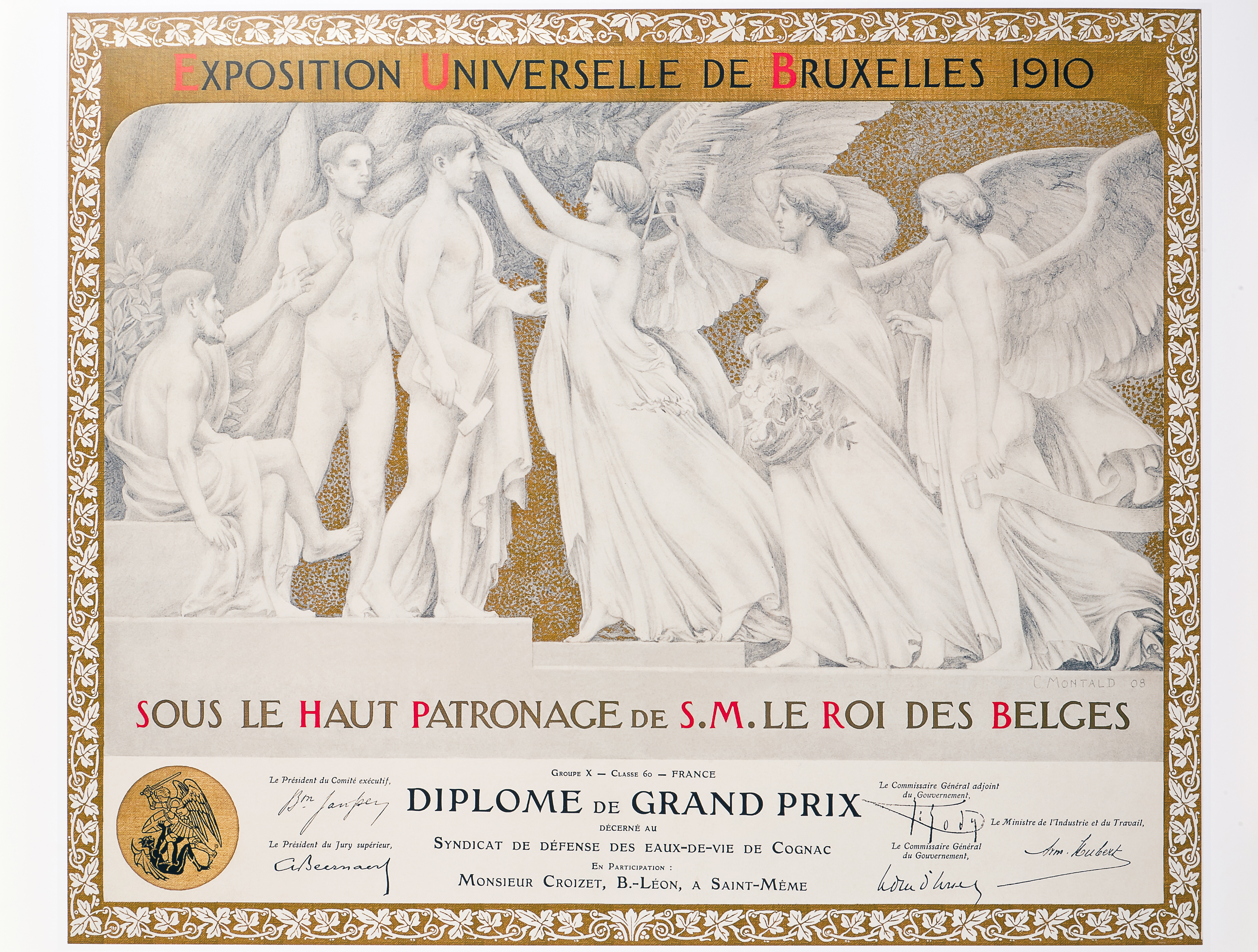
Grand Prix diploma for the 1910 Brussels Exposition Universelle, designed by the Belgian Symbolist painter Constant Montald

Beyond his viticultural work, Léon Benjamin Croizet represented the firm at several major international exhibitions, where its cognacs and his reconstitution efforts both received recognition.

At the 1889 Paris Exposition Universelle, Croizet served as a jury member hors concours—a distinction given to exhibitors of established reputation who served on the judging panel rather than competing for prizes—and was appointed Chevalier of the Order of Agricultural Merit. The house held the same hors concours status at the 1900 Paris Exposition Universelle, where Jean Eymard (Croizet's son-in-law) received a gold medal. The firm's cognacs received further recognition at international exhibitions, including a gold medal at the 1878 Paris Exposition Universelle and Grand Prix awards at the 1908 London and 1910 Brussels exhibitions.

=== Croizet-Eymard era (1911–2007) ===
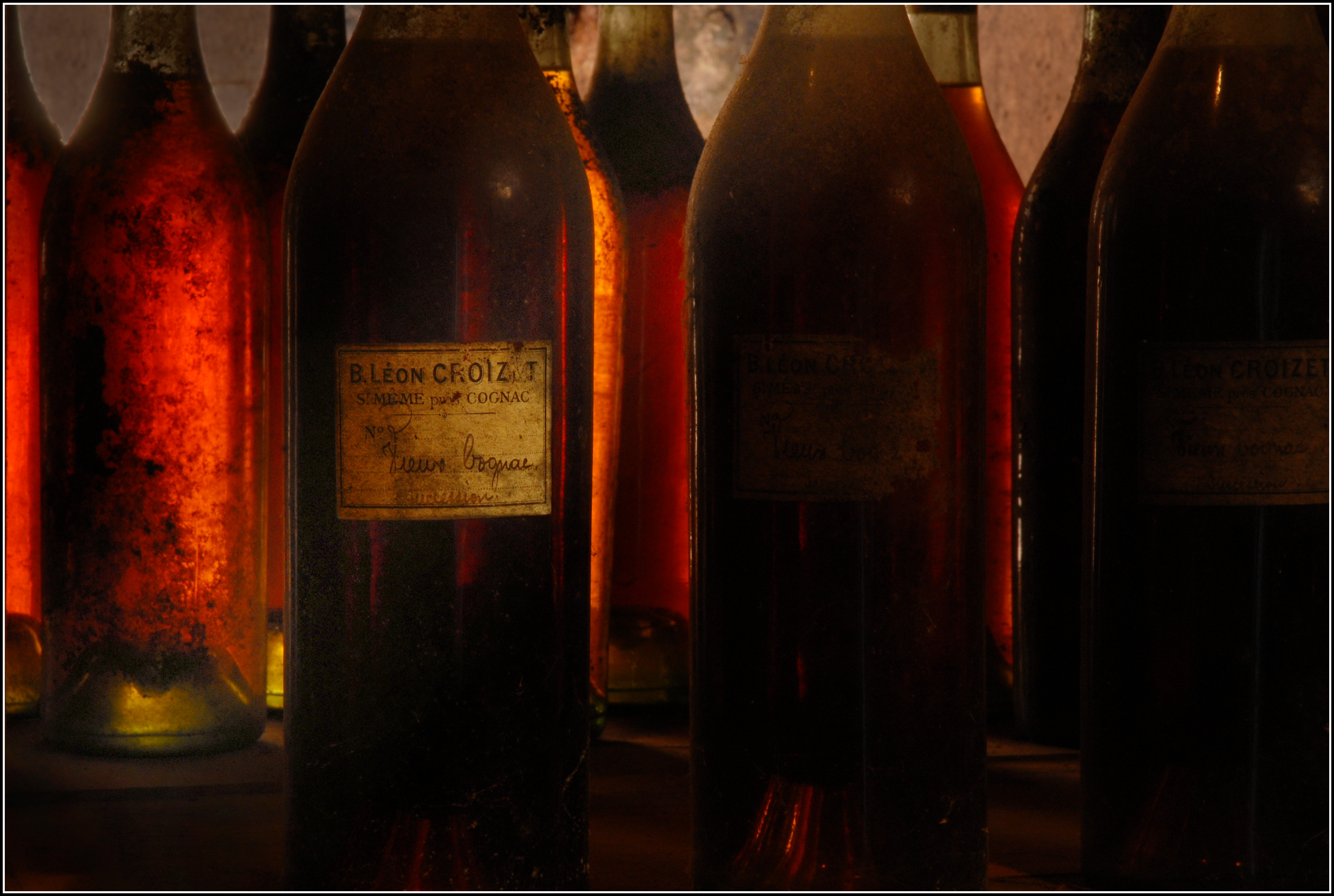
Pre-phylloxera vintage cognac in the Croizet paradis; part of the reserve stock given as a dowry at the 1892 marriage of Léonie Croizet to Pierre Jean Eymard

Following Léon Benjamin Croizet's death in Nice on 3 March 1911, the firm passed to the Eymard family through the 1892 marriage of his daughter Léonie Croizet (born 1874) to Pierre Jean Eymard (born c. 1863). Pierre Jean Eymard was born in Havana, Cuba, into the French merchant diaspora. Gregory (1997) recorded that part of the house's pre-phylloxera reserve stock had been given as a dowry on this marriage. The company subsequently traded under the name Croizet-Eymard & C^{ie} and later as Veuve B. Léon Croizet & C^{ie}.

In the following generation, Pierre Léon Jean Eymard (born 1894), eldest son of Pierre Jean and Léonie, married Marie Jacqueline Camus (1902–1984), daughter of Gaston Camus (1865–1945) of the Camus cognac house—connecting the Croizet, Eymard, and Camus families.

Under the Eymard family's stewardship, the firm built a robust domestic logistics network. A surviving collection of approximately 200 commercial letters from the firm's archive, spanning 1905 to 1948 and offered at public auction in 2018, documents a wide French client base of hotels, restaurants, and regional distributors, including wartime invoices from the firm trading as P. J. Eymard & C^{ie} (Propriétaires de Vignobles, St Même près Cognac).

==== International distribution ====
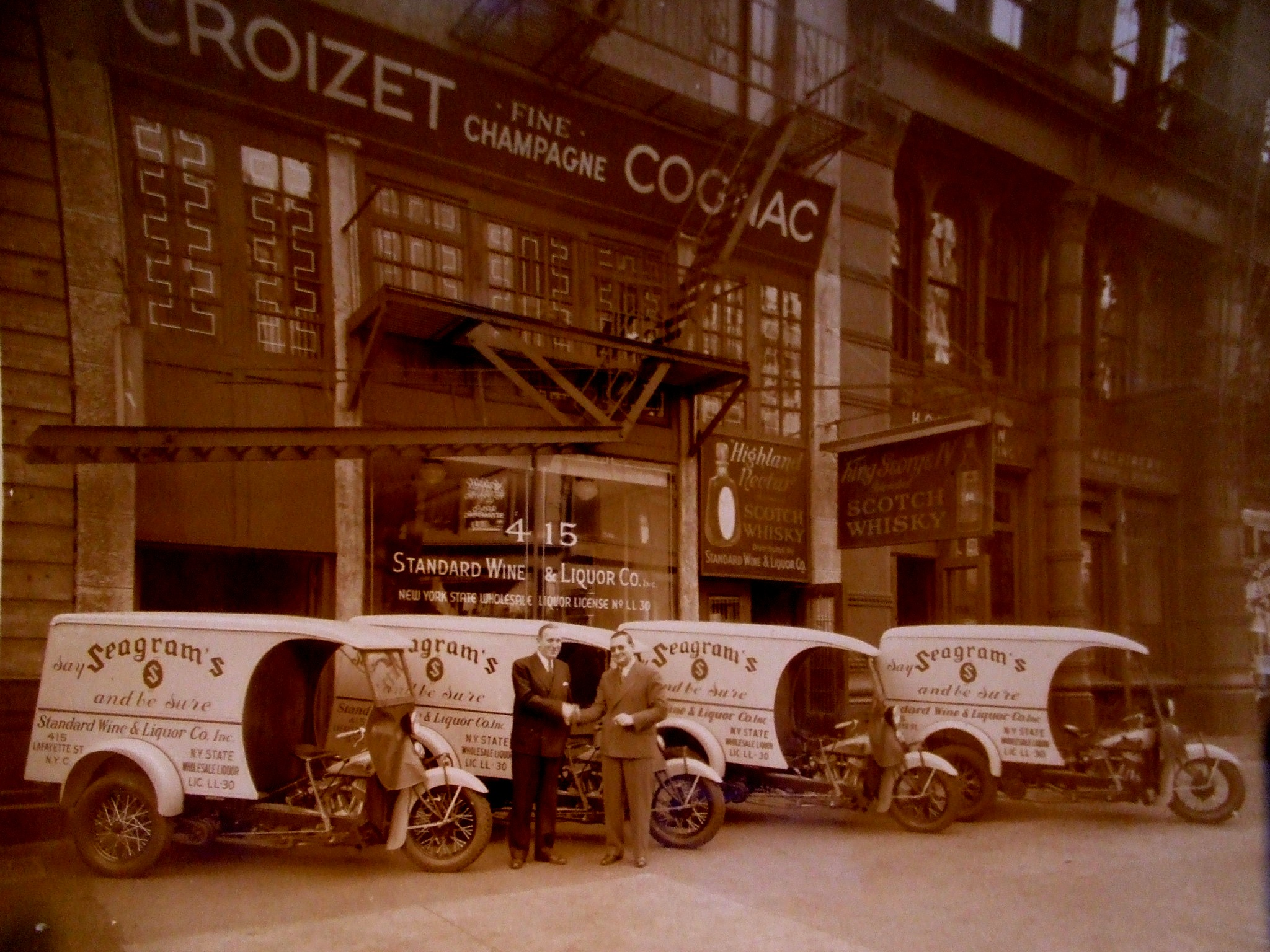
"Croizet Fine Champagne Cognac" signage above Standard Wine & Liquor Co. at 415 Lafayette Street, New York City, late 1930s

Late 19th-century trade labels described B. Léon Croizet as Fournisseur de M. le Président de la République (supplier to the President of the French Republic), as well as purveyor to the Compagnie Générale Transatlantique, and in Paris to the Hôtel Continental and the Grand Hôtel. A German-language trade brochure issued by the firm c. 1900 listed commercial agents or depots in 18 cities across four continents, reflecting the breadth of the house's export network at the turn of the century.

The British distribution network was supported by independent chemical analyses. In January 1898, A. Norman Tate, a public analyst in Liverpool, examined four grades of Croizet on behalf of the London importers Cossart, Gordon and Co. Five months later, The Lancet published its own laboratory analysis of the house's shipments, noting an alcohol content of 38.50–39.30% by weight, with volatile ether content increasing with maturity.

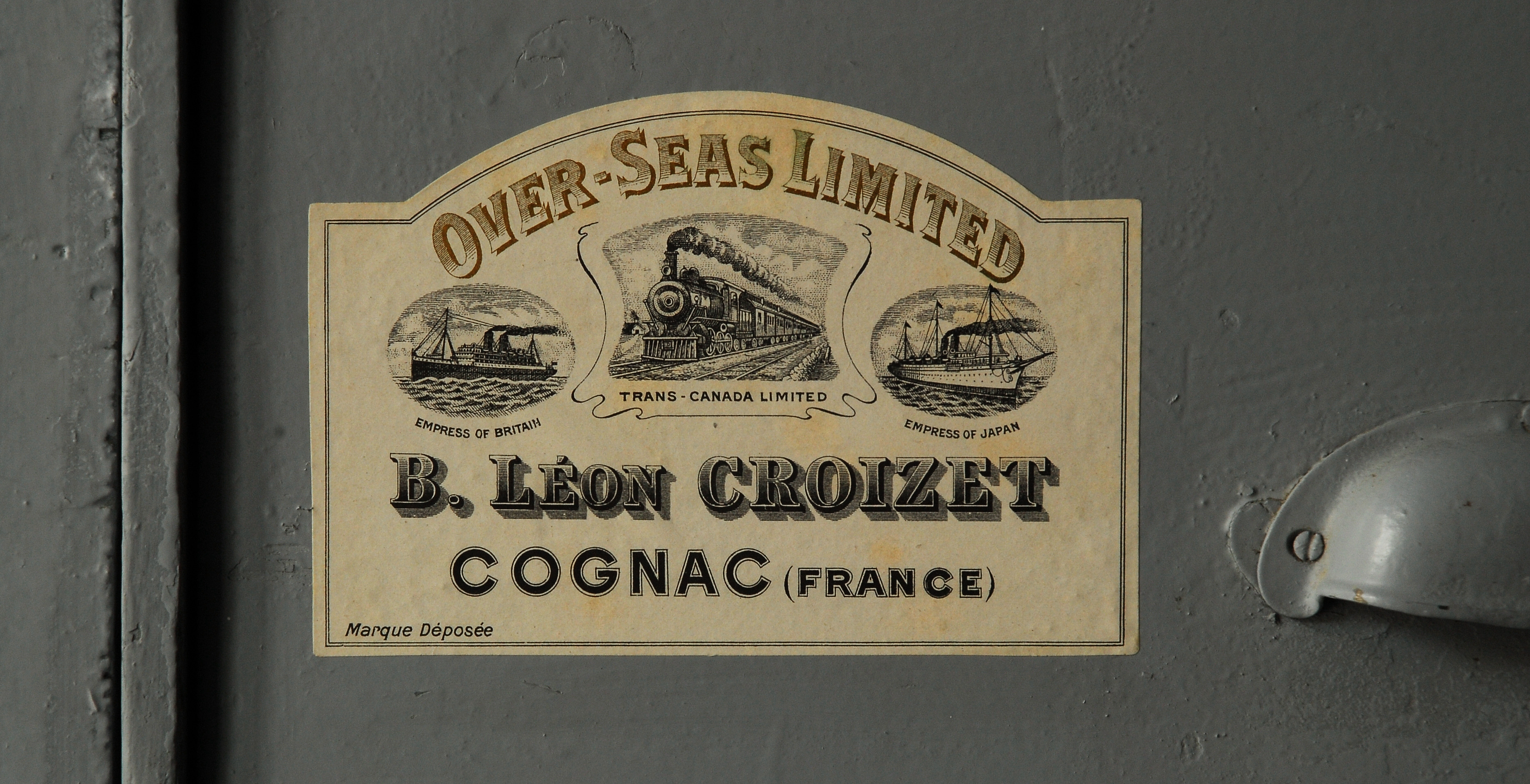
Croizet "Over-Seas Limited" label, produced for distribution aboard Canadian Pacific Empress ocean liners

By the late 1930s, Croizet cognac was distributed in the United States by Standard Wine & Liquor Co., a wholesale firm based at 415 Lafayette Street, New York City. Following the Second World War, the house's prestige expressions were retailed by the London department store Fortnum & Mason. A 1960s catalogue, issued under the store's royal warrant, offered the 1914 Bonaparte vintage in a gift set, marketing it on the premise that "like many of the great Cognac houses, old vintages cannot now be bought". Gregory (1997) documented that Croizet appeared on the wine lists of Michelin-starred French restaurants including Troisgros, La Tour d'Argent, and Vergé.

==== Vintage stocks ====
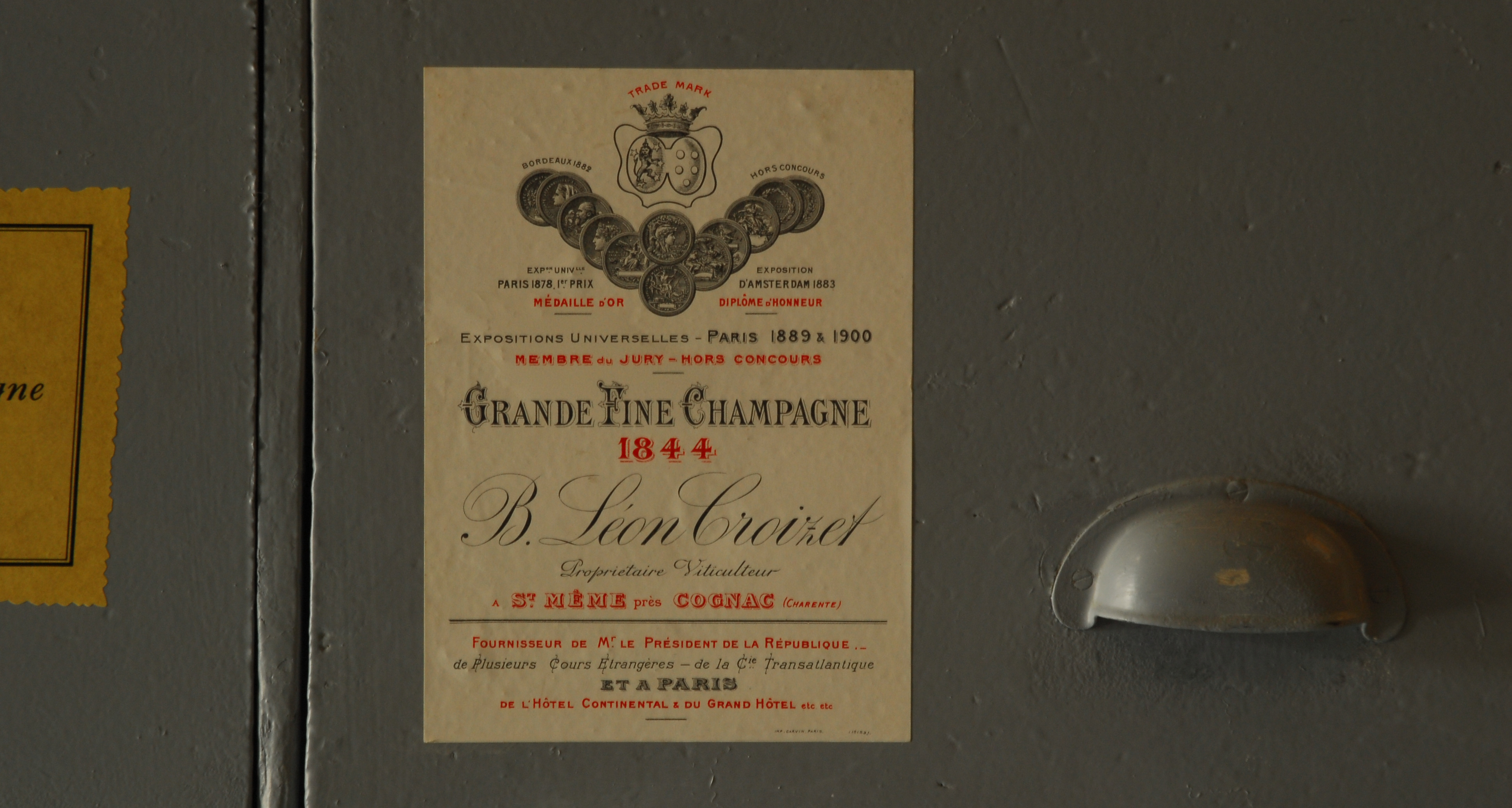
Label from an 1844 vintage Grande Fine Champagne, citing a medal from the Bordeaux exhibition of 1882

The firm's longstanding practice of maintaining vintage-dated stocks gained renewed commercial significance from 1988, when updated regulations permitted producers with documented provenance to sell millésimé cognacs. Faith (2001) noted that Croizet and Hine were among the houses that took advantage of this framework. Gregory (1997) wrote that the house had "shown such assiduous record-keeping that it has been permitted to sell some cognacs as single vintages". According to cognac industry sources, the firm was one of three houses—alongside Hine and Delamain—that maintained continuous records of vintage stocks during a period when the BNIC restricted commercial labelling of vintage-dated cognac from 1962.

=== Modern era (2007–present) ===
By the early 21st century, the estate was managed by Philippe Pierre Jean Gaston Eymard (1925–2013), the grandson of Pierre Jean Eymard and Léonie Croizet, who served as chairman and chief executive. On 13 February 2007, Eymard sold the Croizet cognac house to the Russian Wine Trust (RWT), a Moscow-based wine and spirits producer, importer, and distributor (the trust has since been dissolved). The transaction was widely noted in the trade press as the first significant acquisition of a cognac house by a Russian investor. The sale ended eight generations of continuous family ownership spanning 202 years.

Following the acquisition, the new ownership announced a US$15 million (equivalent to US$22,430,448 in 2025) investment programme aimed at acquiring 77 additional hectares of vines and more than doubling annual revenue to €10 million. The house gained institutional recognition under its new management when it was admitted to the Syndicat des producteurs de Cognac in the summer of 2008. The company is currently registered as a société par actions simplifiée (SAS) and managed by Marina Roy, who serves as managing director.

In the subsequent decades, the house expanded its distribution across Asian and Middle Eastern luxury markets, establishing dedicated placements at MGM Macau from 2009 and the Le Clos duty-free boutique at Dubai International Airport. In early 2026, the house formally launched operations in the Israeli market and introduced its Bonaparte Collection to target emerging sectors in South America, Africa, and India.

Croizet's commercial activity in Asia following the 2007 acquisition was historically associated with Croizet Hong Kong Limited, a separately incorporated affiliate established in 2007 by Alexander Shponko and a business partner, which presented the Cuvée Léonie 1858 at the 2011 Shanghai auction (see § Notable sales). In December 2025, the United States-based sanctions and risk-intelligence firm Kharon reported that Shponko also held stakes in several other Hong Kong-registered companies, including Cuvee Importers Limited, which the European Union designated under export restrictions in July 2025 for activities supporting the Russian defence sector. According to Kharon, Cuvee Importers had sent hundreds of shipments of items on the international Common High Priority List to Russia since the 2022 invasion of Ukraine. Kharon found "no ownership stake, management role, or direct involvement" by Marina Roy or Maison Croizet in the Hong Kong entities.

==== Trademark dispute ====
During this period, a trademark and trade name dispute arose between the SAS Croizet entity and Léopold Croizet (formerly Pierre Croizet), a descendant of the original family through the Eymard line who operated a separate cognac production business in the Fins Bois cru and registered the domain name croizet.com in 2000.

In a decision on 7 September 2022 (n° 21-12.602), the Cour de cassation ruled on the case, addressing the exception d'homonymie (homonymy exception)—a principle in French trademark law under which a person may use their own patronymic name in commerce, even when it conflicts with an existing trademark, provided they act in good faith and take steps to avoid confusion. The ruling ordered the transfer of the domain name to Maison Croizet while affirming the defendant's right to use the patronymic name, subject to displaying the given name in the same font size as the surname. Following the resolution, the competing entity rebranded as Léopold Croizet in 2024.

== Estates and terroir ==
=== Vineyards ===
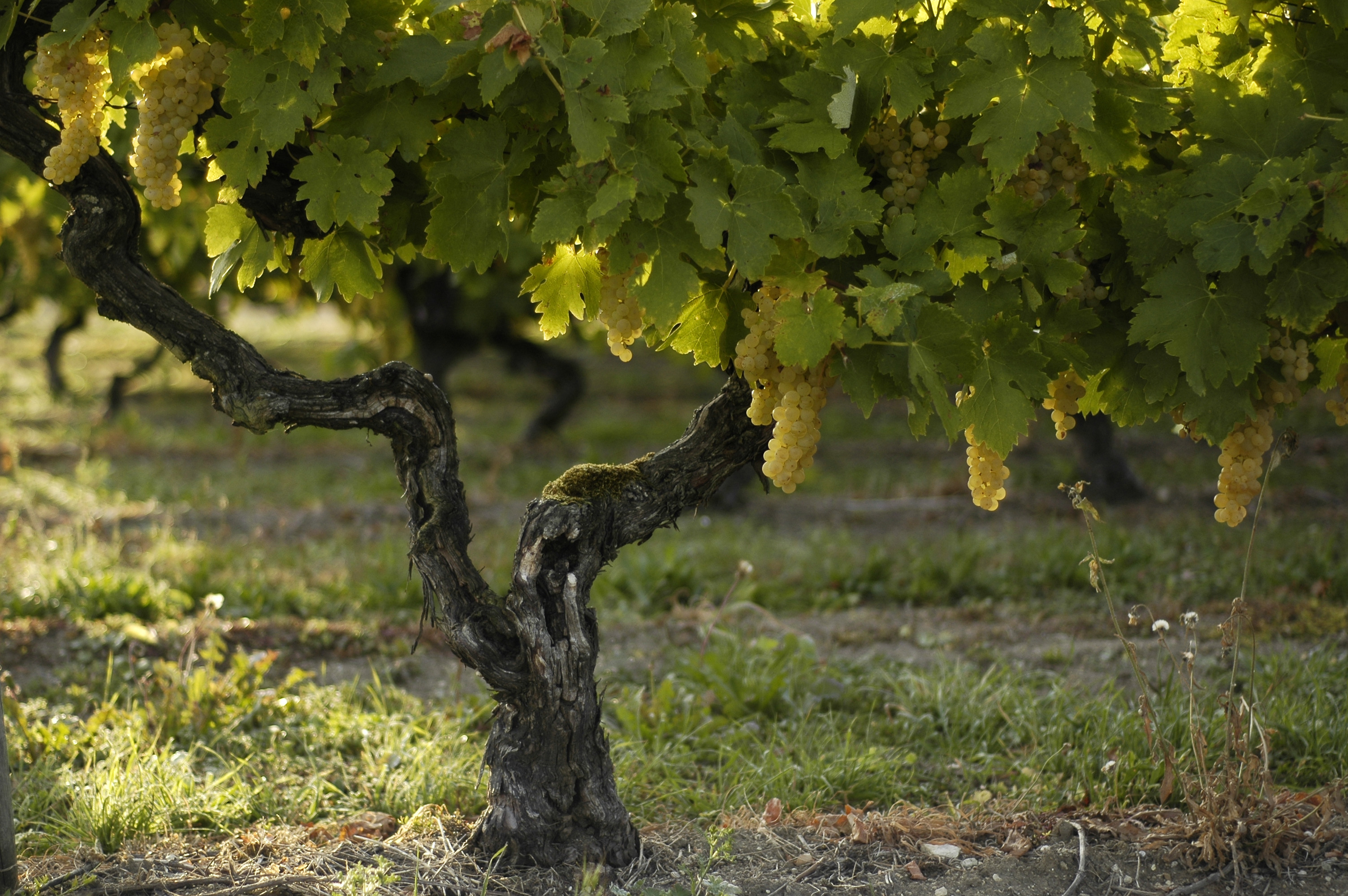
Ugni blanc grapes on the vine at Croizet, Grande Champagne

Croizet's vineyards are situated in the Grande Champagne cru, the innermost of the six designated growing areas of the Cognac appellation. Grande Champagne is characterised by a subsoil rich in Cretaceous chalk and limestone; the region's geology dates primarily to the Campanian and Santonian stages of the Late Cretaceous. The Encyclopædia Britannica notes that the Campanian stage takes its name from a hillside called La Grande Champagne near Aubeterre-sur-Dronne.

The estate's holdings in the Grande Champagne region amounted to 58 ha (140 acres) at the time of the 2007 acquisition. Documenting the wider estate, Gregory (1997) recorded a total property of approximately 370 acres (150 ha), distributed across several named domains, the largest being Château de l'Épine (148.2 acres or 60.0 ha), Domaine de Flaville and Domaine des Couronnes de Douvesse (each approximately 89 acres or 36 ha), and Maine Androux (44.6 acres or 18.0 ha). The house's total supply comprised 70% Grande Champagne, 15% Petite Champagne, and 15% from the Fins Bois and Bons Bois districts. The predominant grape variety is Ugni blanc, which accounts for approximately 98% of plantings in the appellation. Historically, the estate also included Folle blanche; Ravaz (1900) recorded a 5-hectare (12-acre) plot of Folle blanche and surviving pre-phylloxera vines of approximately 0.5 ha (1.2 acres) dating to c. 1830–1840.

=== Buildings and cellars ===
==== Headquarters at Saint-Même-les-Carrières ====
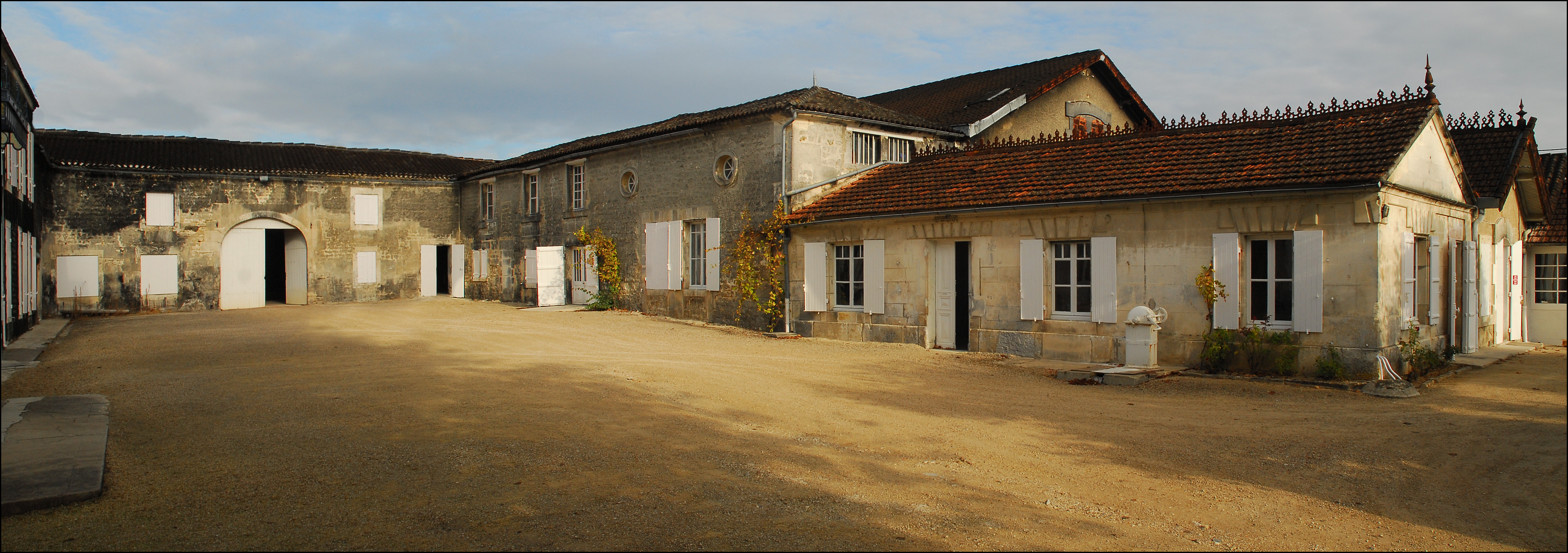
Inner courtyard and chai buildings at the Croizet headquarters

The Croizet headquarters is situated above and within a network of former limestone quarries. The commune's quarries have been worked since the 12th century, producing white Turonian limestone valued for its resistance to seawater and frost; stone from these quarries was used in the construction of the Rochefort naval arsenal under Colbert in the 17th century. The BRGM identified approximately 50 hectares of underground cavities in the commune. The last quarry closed in 1977.

The main building, described in a local historical publication as the "Maison Léon Croizet", does not appear on the second cadastral survey of Saint-Même dated 1849 and was constructed between approximately 1850 and 1880 using pierre de taille (dressed stone) quarried from local Santonian limestone beds. The building features a central projecting bay (avant-corps) surmounted by a triangular pediment with an oculus and a three-storey façade crowned by a moulded stone cornice.

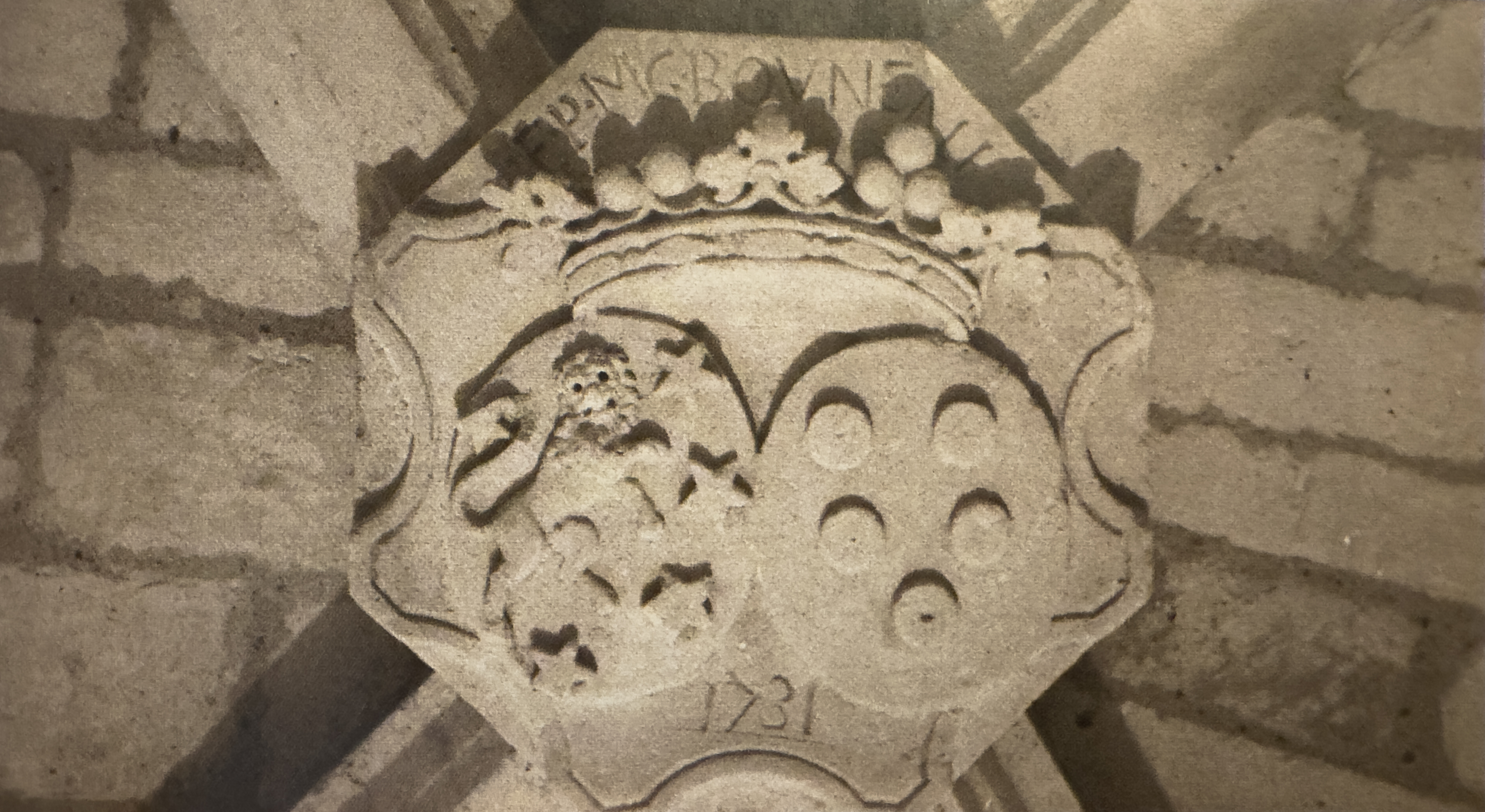
Keystone carved by Guillaume Bouneau (1731) in the église Sainte-Maxime, source of the Croizet commercial emblem

The house's commercial emblem is derived from the keystone (clé de voûte) of the parish church of Sainte-Maxime in Saint-Même-les-Carrières. In 1731, the keystone was installed during restoration work funded jointly by the seigneur and the parish. The stonemason Guillaume Bouneau carved two escutcheons surmounted by a crown with a fleuron: one bearing the arms of the de Culant family—then seigneurs of Saint-Même—described as d'azur semé d'étoiles d'or au lion de même brochant ("azure, semé of gold stars, a lion or over all"), and the other a mason's inscription reading "FPMG BOVNEAU 1731" (Fait Par Moi Guillaume Bouneau 1731). This double escutcheon was subsequently adopted by the Croizet house and appears on its bottles.

According to the same publication, around 1880 Léon Croizet commissioned Paul Abadie fils (1812–1884), the architect of the Sacré-Cœur basilica in Paris, to redesign the interior of the main residence. Surviving sketches—comprising a site plan, refurbishment drawings, and details of interior woodwork and the main entrance door—were acquired at auction in Angoulême in 1999 and are preserved at the Archives départementales de la Charente.

==== Underground cellars ====
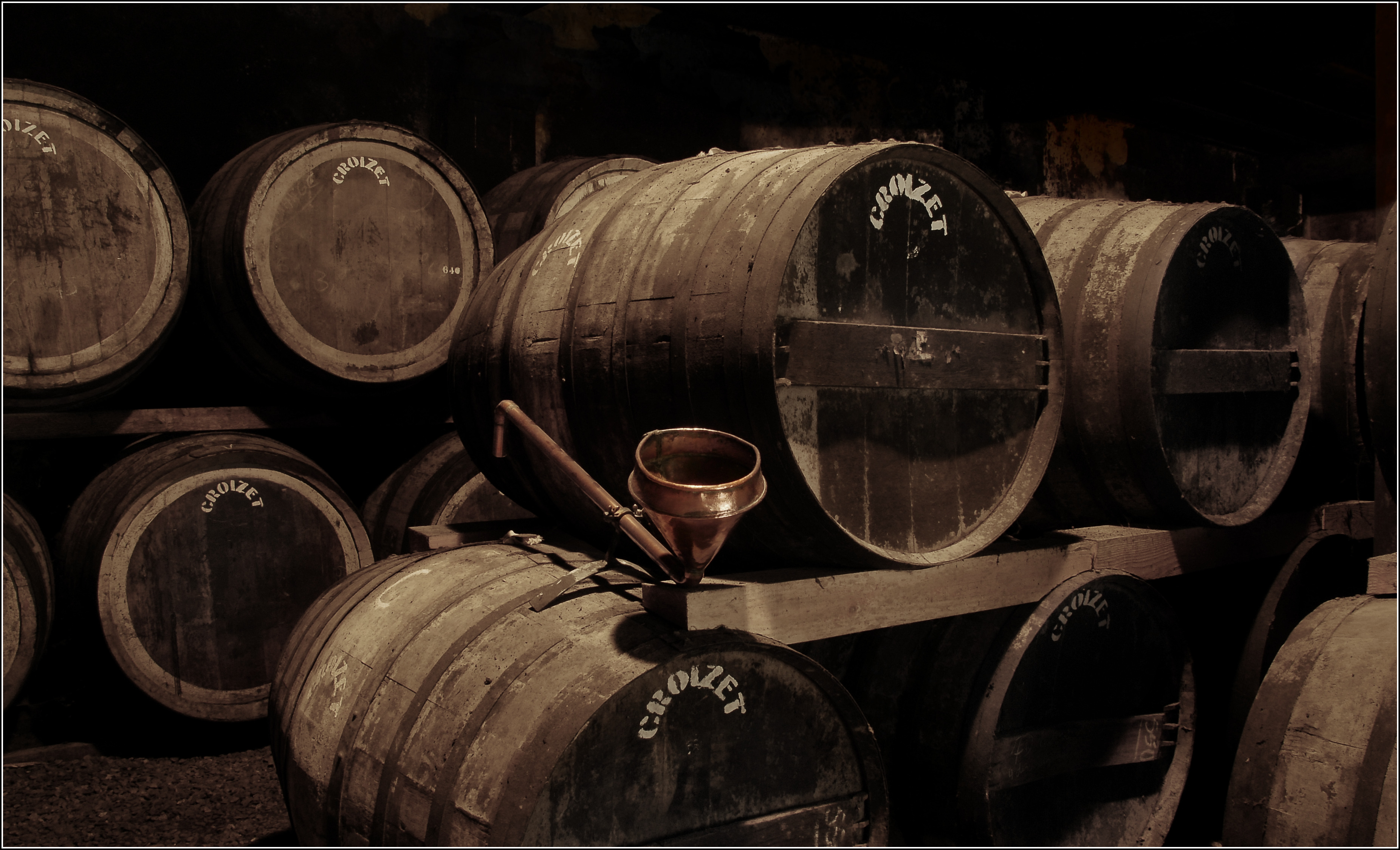
Oak casks marked "CROIZET" ageing in the chai, with a traditional copper funnel (entonnoir) in the foreground

Gregory (1997) described the cellars as extending to a depth of 50 m (164 ft). The cellar walls are covered in Baudoinia compniacensis, a sooty mould of the class Dothideomycetes that thrives on the ethanol vapours released during the slow evaporation of spirit through the cask walls—a loss known colloquially as the "angel's share". The species was first investigated in 1872 by French pharmacist Antonin Baudoin and was formally reclassified in 2007.

==== Logis de Flaville ====
The Logis de Flaville (Note: Heritage sources use the designation logis (manor house); "Château de Flaville" is used in commercial branding and was registered as a trademark for eaux-de-vie in 1924.) is located in the commune of Bonneuil, within the canton of Segonzac, also in Grande Champagne. Acquired by Léon Benjamin Croizet in 1889, it has served as a secondary estate associated with the house. Gregory (1997) described the property as encompassing 88.9 acres and noted that it had formerly been a hunting lodge associated with the Duke of Montmorency-Bouteville.

According to local and regional heritage sources, the logis incorporates architectural elements salvaged from the ruined Château de Bouteville, which was dismantled c. 1804. The dispersal of fragments from Bouteville is documented in the Base Mérimée, the national heritage database maintained by the Ministry of Culture.

== Production ==
=== Distillation ===
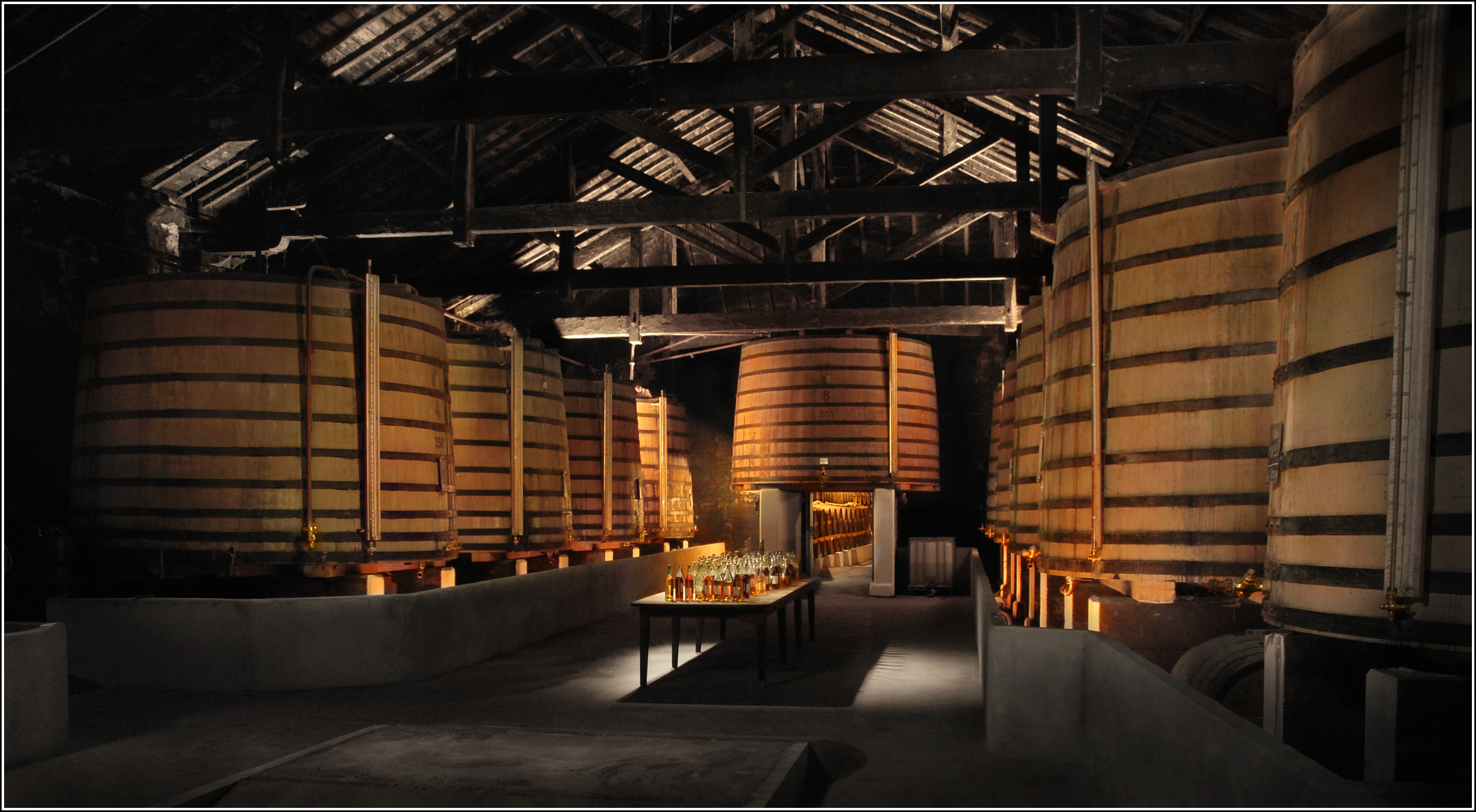
The vat room (chai de foudres) at Croizet, illustrating the scale of historic reserves

Cognac production is governed by the appellation d'origine contrôlée regulations, which mandate double distillation in copper pot stills known as alambics charentais. The first distillation produces the brouillis (approximately 28–32% ABV), which is redistilled to yield the bonne chauffe at approximately 70% ABV. The distillation season runs from October to 31 March. At the time of the 2007 acquisition, the estate operated four alembic pot stills.

=== Ageing ===
Following distillation, the bonne chauffe is transferred to oak casks for aging. The house uses casks made from oak sourced from the forests of Limousin and Tronçais. The underground cellars at Saint-Même-les-Carrières (see § Underground cellars) provide the stable, humid conditions optimal for extended maturation. The oldest spirits are transferred from oak casks to glass demijohns (dame-jeannes), where they rest without further contact with wood—a practice known in the cognac trade as the paradis.

=== Vintage cognac (millésimé) ===
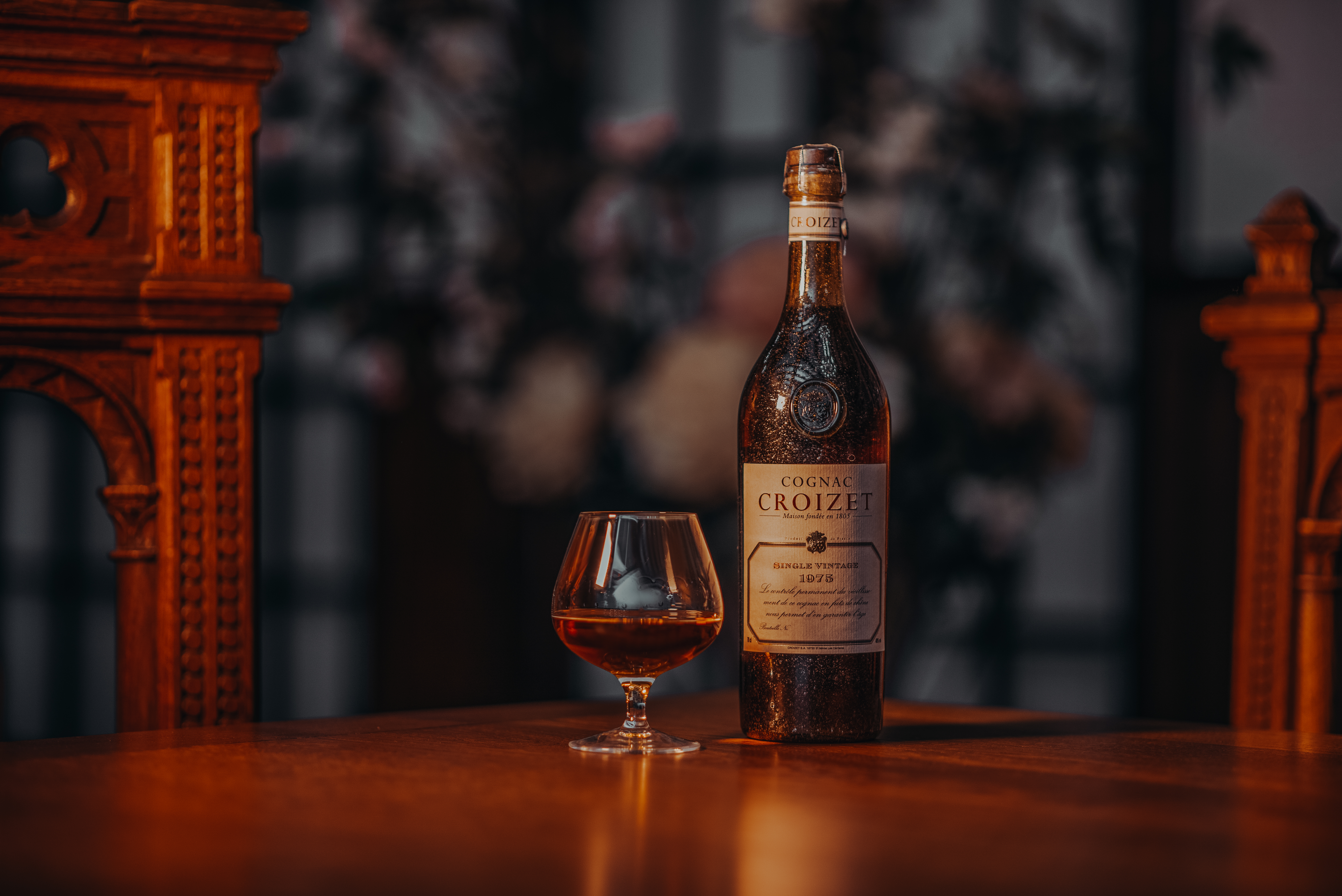
Croizet Single Vintage 1975 cognac

Most commercial cognac is sold as a blend of eaux-de-vie from multiple harvest years, classified by minimum age designations such as VS, VSOP, and XO. Vintage cognac (cognac millésimé), by contrast, is produced entirely from the distillation of grapes harvested in a single year.

To ensure the integrity of vintage stocks, the BNIC implemented a control mechanism known as the "two-key system" (système des deux clés). Under this arrangement, the cellar containing vintage-dated stocks is sealed by two independent locks: one key is held by the producer's cellar master and the other by a BNIC inspector. Access requires the simultaneous presence of both keyholders.

The current regulatory framework governing vintage spirit labelling was established by Décret n° 2016-1757 of 16 December 2016, effective 1 January 2017.

== Products ==
=== Historical and vintage expressions ===
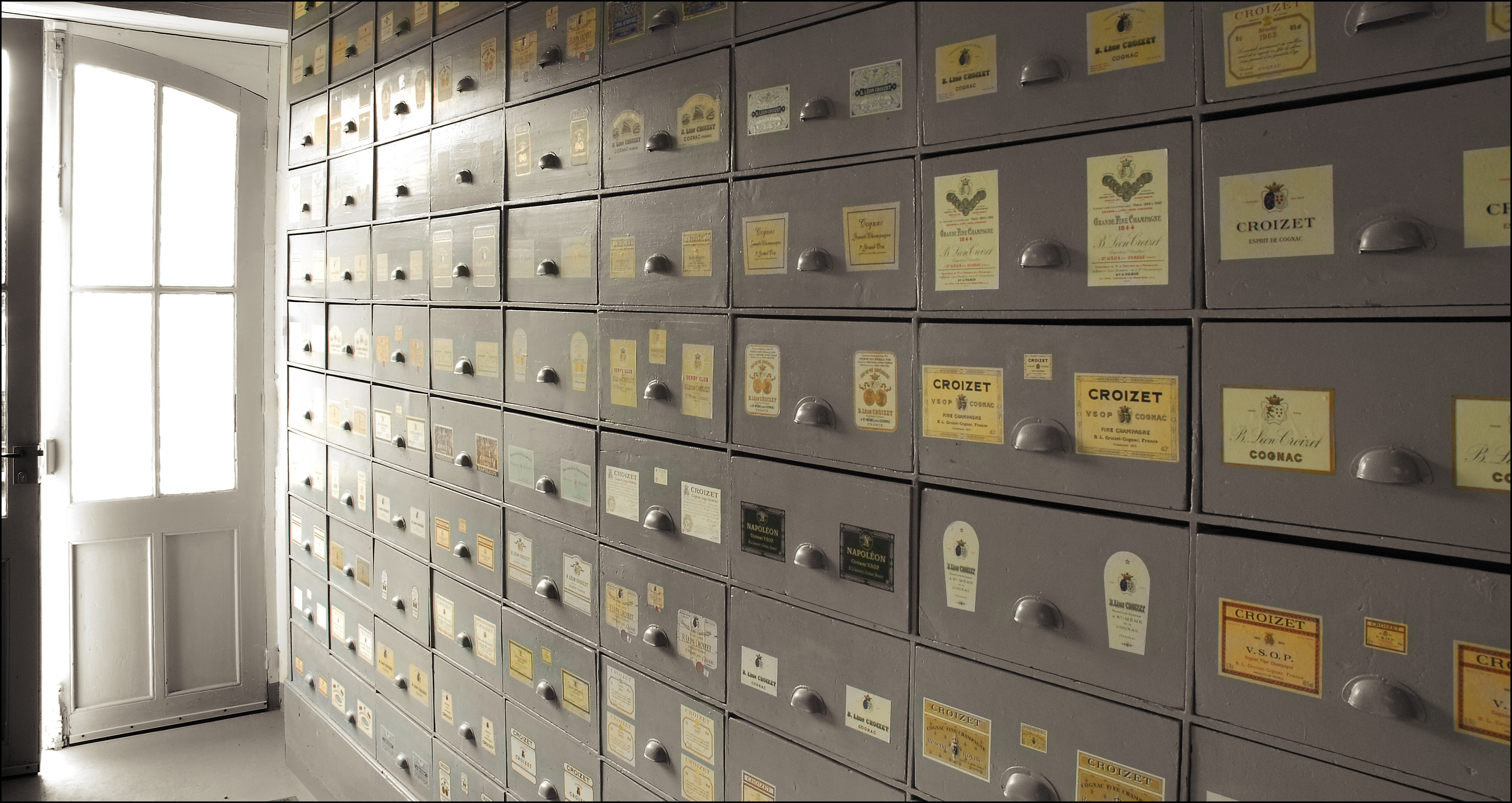
Cabinet displaying historic Croizet labels at Croizet, Saint-Même-les-Carrières

The house offers vintage expressions, notably the Cuvée Léonie 1858—a pre-phylloxera vintage cognac named after Léonie Croizet (see § Croizet-Eymard era)—and individually vintaged cognacs from the 1960s through the 1990s. Surviving archival labels from the Veuve B. Léon Croizet period document a Grande Fine Champagne vintage dated 1795 and a Réserve Royale vintage dated 1800, both predating the house's founding date of 1805. Some older vintages were presented in Baccarat crystal decanters; the 1894 Réserve Royale, bottled in the 1950s–1960s in a Baccarat decanter, has appeared at auction houses including Bonhams.

=== Current range ===
The current range comprises cognac expressions classified by age in accordance with BNIC standards—VS, VSOP, Napoléon, XO, and Extra—produced from Grande Champagne eaux-de-vie. The house also produces a cognac-based liqueur flavoured with orange. Several expressions hold kosher certification from the Badatz Chug Chatam Sofer of Bnei Brak.

As of the mid-1990s, the range included Croizet VS, Carrière VS, Dorlan VS, Boyard VS, Matte VS, Croizet VSOP, Croizet Napoléon, Croizet XO, and Croizet Réserve Particulière, with some bottlings under the label Vicomte de Bressiac. Sales during this period were concentrated in East Asian markets, particularly Japan, Hong Kong, China, Taiwan, and Korea. The house had earlier been listed among the cognac producers of Grande Champagne in Thomas R. Bennett's Domine: The Complete Wine Handbook (1968).

== Reception ==
=== Published assessments ===
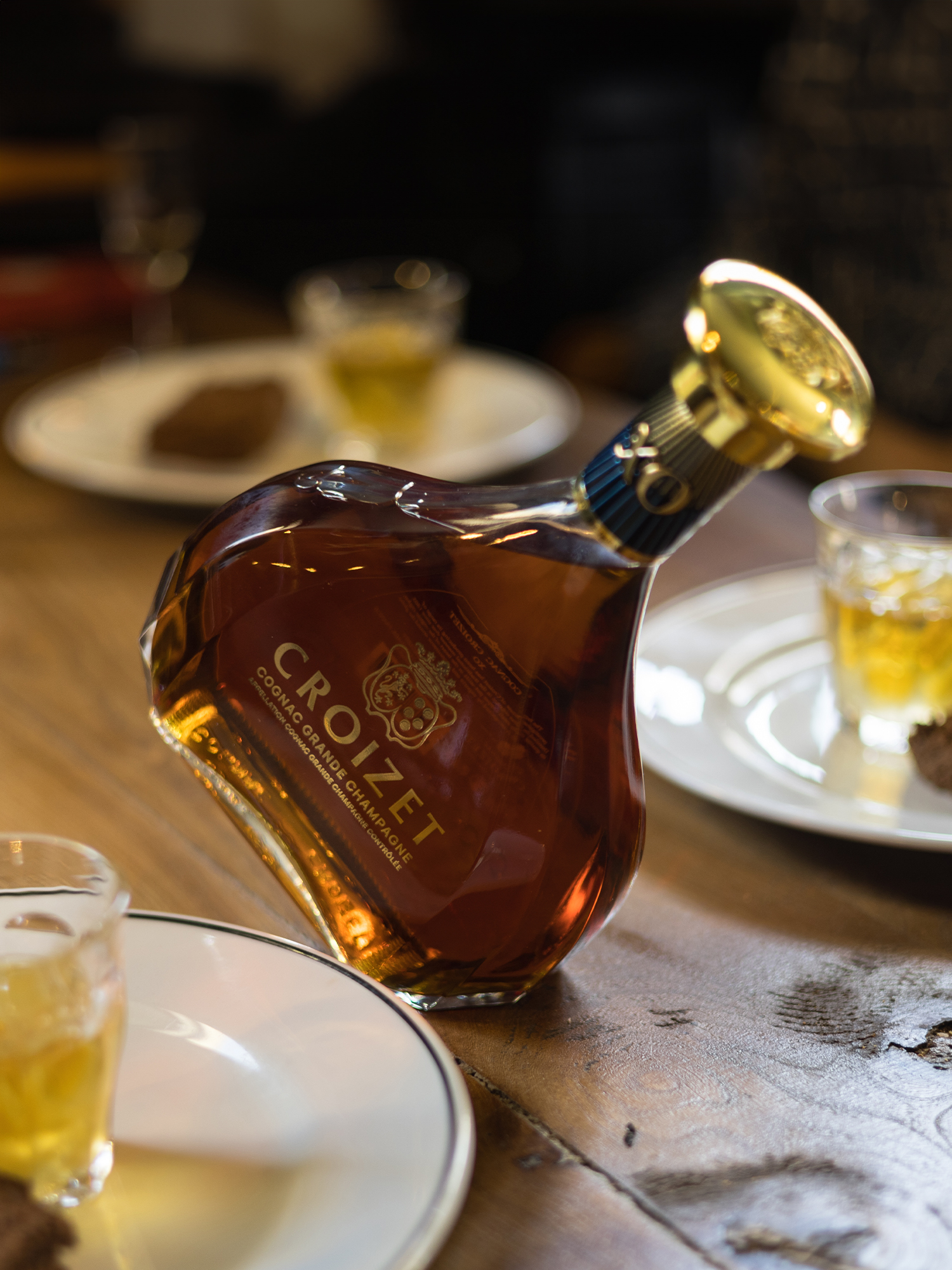
Croizet XO Grande Champagne cognac

Published assessments of the house have generally been positive, though they vary by expression. Faith (2001) characterised the house as "old-established" and noted that its reserves included spirits from the early 20th century, singling out a cognac from the 1963 vintage. Gregory (1997) profiled the house over two pages and rated the Croizet XO "Age Inconnu" as "Good to very good", a tier below his highest rating. F. Paul Pacult's The New Kindred Spirits (2021) differentiated more sharply among the range: the VS, Black Legend Grande Champagne, and XO Grande Champagne each received four-star ratings (Highly Recommended), while the VSOP Grande Champagne received only three stars (Recommended). In the 2019 Ultimate Spirits Challenge, founded and directed by Pacult, the VS scored 95 points ("Extraordinary, Ultimate Recommendation") and the Black Legend 94 points ("Excellent, Highly Recommended").

=== Competition results ===
Expressions across the Croizet portfolio—ranging from its younger VS and VSOP to its older XO and Extra classifications—have been consistently evaluated at international spirit ratings competitions. Over the past two decades, the house has been awarded Double Gold for its XO and Extra expressions, as well as Best in Show for its Extra, at the San Francisco World Spirits Competition, and Gold for its Extra at the Concours Mondial de Bruxelles. In 2025, the Croizet XO received Gold in the Design & Packaging Masters, a competition organised by The Spirits Business to recognise premium spirits packaging.

== Notable sales ==
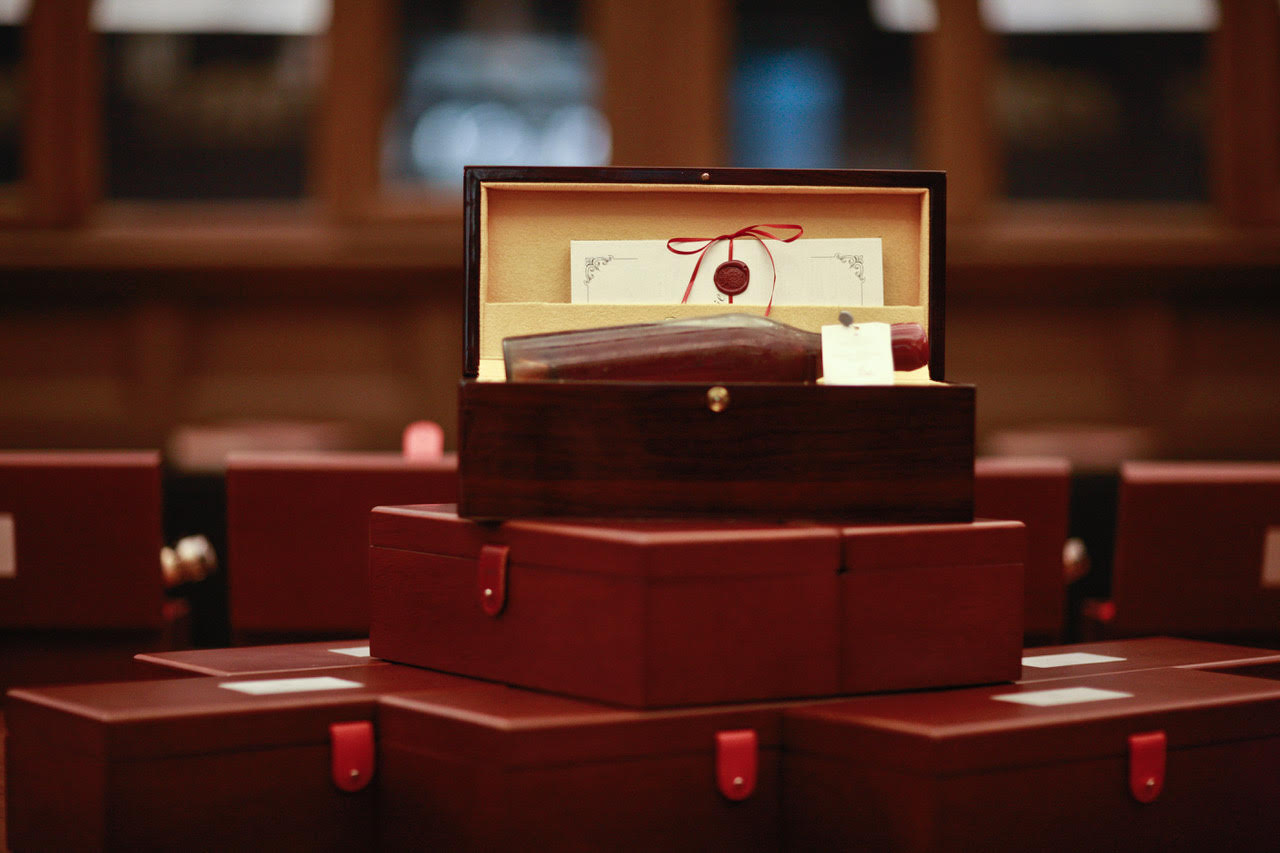
Croizet Cuvée Léonie 1858 at the Shanghai auction, 24 September 2011

On 24 September 2011, a bottle of the Cuvée Léonie 1858—a pre-phylloxera vintage cognac and the oldest expression in the current Croizet portfolio—sold for CN¥1,000,000 (approximately US$156,740, equivalent to US$224,328 in 2025) at an invitation-only auction held at the Swatch Art Peace Hotel on the Bund, Shanghai. (Note: The South China Morning Post reported the event as the first cognac-only auction held on the Chinese mainland.) The sale was certified by Guinness World Records as the most expensive cognac sold at auction. The record was subsequently surpassed in 2020 by a bottle of Gautier cognac (1762), sold at Sotheby's for £122,696.

On 7 February 2013, The Winston, a cocktail using 60 ml (2.0 US fl oz) of the Cuvée Léonie 1858 as its base spirit, was prepared at Club 23 in the Crown Casino, Melbourne, and sold for A$12,500 (approximately US$13,438, equivalent to US$18,573 in 2025). Guinness World Records certified it as the most expensive cocktail. The record was published in the Guinness World Records 2014 annual. In April 2025, a cocktail sold at a restaurant in Dubai for €37,500 was reported in trade media as having surpassed the record; as of 2025, the Guinness World Records website continues to list The Winston as the official record holder.

On 9 November 2016, a 40 ml (1.4 US fl oz) shot of the Cuvée Léonie 1858 was sold at the InterContinental Hong Kong for HK$68,000 (approximately US$8,763, equivalent to US$11,756 in 2025), certified by Guinness World Records as the most expensive shot of cognac. The proceeds were donated to AIDS Concern, a Hong Kong charitable organisation. This record was surpassed on 21 March 2018, when a shot of Rome de Bellegarde cognac (1894) was sold for £10,014 (approximately US$14,154, equivalent to US$18,147 in 2025) at Hyde bar in Kensington, London.

Bottles of Croizet cognac have appeared at Sotheby's, including a bottle of the 1906 Bonaparte vintage from the cellar of Earl Spencer at Althorp House (2020), from the Cointreau family collection (2020), and from the Paul Jaboulet Aîné collection (2021).

== Cultural references ==
=== Advertising art ===
Advertising poster by Marcellin Auzolle, held in the collections of the Bibliothèque nationale de France

A colour advertising poster for Croizet cognac was created by Marcellin Auzolle (1862–1942), a French poster artist also known for creating one of the earliest cinema advertising posters in 1896, promoting the Lumière brothers' Cinématographe. The Croizet poster, promoting the brand as "Fine Champagne — B. Léon Croizet — Saint-Même-Cognac — 1er Cru Classé", is held in the collections of the Bibliothèque nationale de France and the Musées de la Ville de Cognac.

=== Cultural and gastronomic references ===
Croizet cognac has appeared in a range of social, historical, and literary contexts.

In British society reporting, a November 1957 column in The Tatler and Bystander documented a 1906 vintage Croizet being served at a high-profile dinner at The Bell at Aston Clinton, alongside a 1952 Romanée-Conti, characterising the cognac as "a worthy finale to its fellow wines".

Joseph Scott and Donald Bain's The World's Best Bartender's Guide (1998) states that Winston Churchill and Dwight D. Eisenhower shared a bottle of Croizet 1858 cognac during the Second World War; the book provides no date or primary source for this claim.

In fiction, the private detective Mike Shayne keeps a bottle of Croizet cognac in Brett Halliday's novel One Night with Nora (1953), and Chuck Palahniuk's novel Tell-All (2010) references bottles of the 1906 vintage.

== See also ==
- Cognac (brandy)
- Grande Champagne
- Phylloxera
- Great French Wine Blight

== Bibliography ==
- Bennett, Thomas R. (1968). Domine: The Complete Wine Handbook. San Francisco: Wine Appreciation Guild.
- Faith, Nicholas (2001). Classic Brandy. London: Prion Books. ISBN 1-85375-281-9.
- Gaillard, Jean-Paul (1993). Châteaux, logis et demeures anciennes de la Charente (in French). Librairie Bruno Sepulchre.
- Gregory, Conal R. (1997). The Cognac Companion: A Connoisseur's Guide. Running Press. ISBN 0-7624-0195-8.
- Pacult, F. Paul (2021). The New Kindred Spirits. Simon & Schuster. ISBN 1-950665-96-8.
- Ravaz, Louis (1900). Le Pays du Cognac (in French). Angoulême: Coquemard.
- Saint-Même Patrimoine (2003). Saint-Même-les-Carrières: Notes historiques autour de la pierre (in French). Saint-Même Patrimoine.
