= Jean-Sébastien Robicquet =

French oenologist

- Born: September 20, 1966 (age 59); Bègles, France
- Occupation(s): Oenologist, entrepreneur, distiller
- Known for: Founding EuroWineGate which became Maison Villevert

Jean-Sébastien Robicquet is a French oenologist, entrepreneur, wine maker, master-distiller and company director. He founded EuroWineGate in 2001 which later became Maison Villevert in 2016.

== Early life ==
Robicquet was born on the 20th of September 1966 in Bègles, France and studied at University of Bordeaux.

== Career ==
=== Spirits and brands creator ===
After studying biology and oenology and working for multiple cognacs and wines brands, Jean-Sébastien Robicquet created EuroWineGate, an online Wine & Spirits shop, but he also wanted to create his own spirits brands.

In 2001, Jean-Sébastien Robicquet created, in partnership with Diageo, Cîroc, a French vodka crafted with grapes and known for its five-timed distillation.

G'Vine, a French gin made with grape liquor and vine flowers which are distilled with perfumer skills to extract their aromas was created in 2006.

Then, in 2013, La Quintinye Vermouth Royal is crafted with Pineau des Charentes and a blend of 37 plants.

Maison Villevert and Jean-Sébastien Robicquet also created other spirits brands like June Gin Liqueur, a gin liquor made with wild peaches, Excellia, a tequila which is aged in Cognac and Sauternes casks, La Guilde du Cognac, a Cognac brand which centers around geographic characteristics of the terroir, and Nouaison Gin, a grape-based gin made for the bartending world.

=== Guilde du Cognac ===
In 2017 by Jean-Sébastien Robicquet created a collection of cognacs known as Guilde du Cognac. This collection aimed at showcasing local "terroirs" and craft distillers. It comprises limited series sold only in wine & spirits shops.

The collection comprises four bottles of cognac. Jean-Sébastien Robicquet says that it was created as a nod to the origins of cognac: it would be unfair to forget that craft distilling is born here, in Cognac. Each bottle is created to represent the values of its original terroir and of the craft distiller who produced it.

This range was also the first time village-specific cognacs were introduced:

- Saint-Preuil cognac, in the Grande Champagne area.
- Saint-Germain-de-Vibrac cognac, in the Petite Champagne area.
- Cherves-Richemont cognac, in the Borderies area.
- Lorignac cognac, in the Fins Bois area.

=== Distribution ===
In partnership with William Grant & Sons, Guilde du Cognac reached Asia and is now sold in Asian airports. The collection is also sold at French, Spanish and Portuguese wine merchants through Renaissance Spirits.

=== Recognition ===
- 2018 International Spirit & Wine Competition:
  - Silver 2018 Cognac Awards-Borderies-Vintage-2010
  - Silver outstanding 2018 in Cognac-Fine Bois-Vintage-2011
  - Silver 2018 in Cognac-Petite Champagne-Vintage-2007
  - Silver 2018 in Cognac-Grande Champagne-Extra
- 2018 San Francisco World Spirits Competition:
  - Two double gold medals for Cherves-Richemont village in Borderies and Saint-Preuil village in Grande Champagne bottles
  - Gold medal for the Saint-Germain-de-Vibrac in Petite Champagne bottle
  - Silver medal for the Lorignac in Fins Bois bottle
