= Rome De Bellegarde =

Rome De Bellegarde is a Cognac from France. It is produced in the Grande Champagne region of Cognac. It is most notable for setting the record for the expensive liquor shot of 1.5 ounce measure costing more than $14k at Hyde Kensington Bar in London in 2018. The shot was believed to originate from a blend created in 1894.

== History ==
The Brand was initially started in 1725 by members of the Bellegarde Family honours Dantes Bellegarde, who was a Haitian diplomat and recipient of the Legion d’Honneur for contributing to Haitian independence. Today the brand is led by the new generation of Bellegarde with Dimitri Nalin a member of the family and an executive board member, who was also appointed as their Global Brand Director after being awarded the title of the best sommelier in Aquitaine, France in 2019.

The Limited Edition XO is produced from 100% Ugni blanc grapes, aged for over 25 years in oak barrels, and blended with aged eaux-de-vie sourced from Grande Champagne vineyards.

The brand is also known for being one of the most expensive Cognac in the world after setting up the world record for the most expensive shot of Cognac ever sold. This world record was set during the relaunch of the brand in 2018 with a limited edition expression made of 67 bottles who were created in partnership with master blender Jean Filloux. Four box sets were also produced in 2019 by the luxury jewellery brand Faberge and the launch event was attended by singer Rihanna and her brother.

It is also well reviewed by Spirit Connoisseurs as "It’s a remarkably fragrant Cognac that invites immediate tasting.

In 2021, the company won the Gold Medal for the 2021 Ultra Premium Cognac Masters.
