= Sunky O =

- Born: Olasunkanmi Ojulari; Lagos, Nigeria
- Education: University of Lagos
- Occupations: Author, entrepreneur
- Known for: Entertainment
- Notable work: The Other Side of Midnight

Sunkanmi Ojulari (born Olasunkanmi Ojulari), better known as Sunky O, is a Nigerian author, documentary producer and entrepreneur. He is the founder of The Sunky O Lifestyle Company, an entertainment startup based in Lagos.

He is known for producing the documentary series Nightlife in Lasgidi and authoring the book The Other Side of Midnight, providing analysis into the economic structure of the Nigerian nightlife industry.

== Early life and education ==
Ojulari was born in Lagos State, south-west Nigeria. He attended the University of Lagos, where he graduated with a degree in Accounting.

== Career ==
He worked as a banker with Union Bank of Nigeria before transitioning into entertainment and publishing.

In 2021, Ojulari launched The Sunky O Lifestyle Company, focusing on lifestyle and hospitality management. The firm was involved in the launch and management of various entertainment businesses in Nigeria.

He released Nightlife in Lasgidi, a documentary series about political economy of Lagos nightlife, in 2023. The series was nominated for the Best Documentary (Unscripted) category at the Africa Magic Viewers' Choice Awards (AMVCA) in the same year.

Sunkanmi Ojulari's debut book The Other Side of Midnight, which examined the business operations of the Nigerian entertainment sector, was published by Rovingheights in May 2025.

Ojulari has served as a brand ambassador for several international spirit brands including Macallan and Ciroc.

== Philanthropy ==
Ojulari has publicly commented on social issues affecting Nigerian youth, including End SARS. In 2021, he launched the "Back to School Drive", to provide learning aids to public school students.

== Personal life ==
Ojulari resides in Lagos, Nigeria, and frequently engages in philanthropic initiatives focused on youth empowerment.
