= Frapin =

Cognac producer

Coordinates: 45.6170°N 0.2182°W

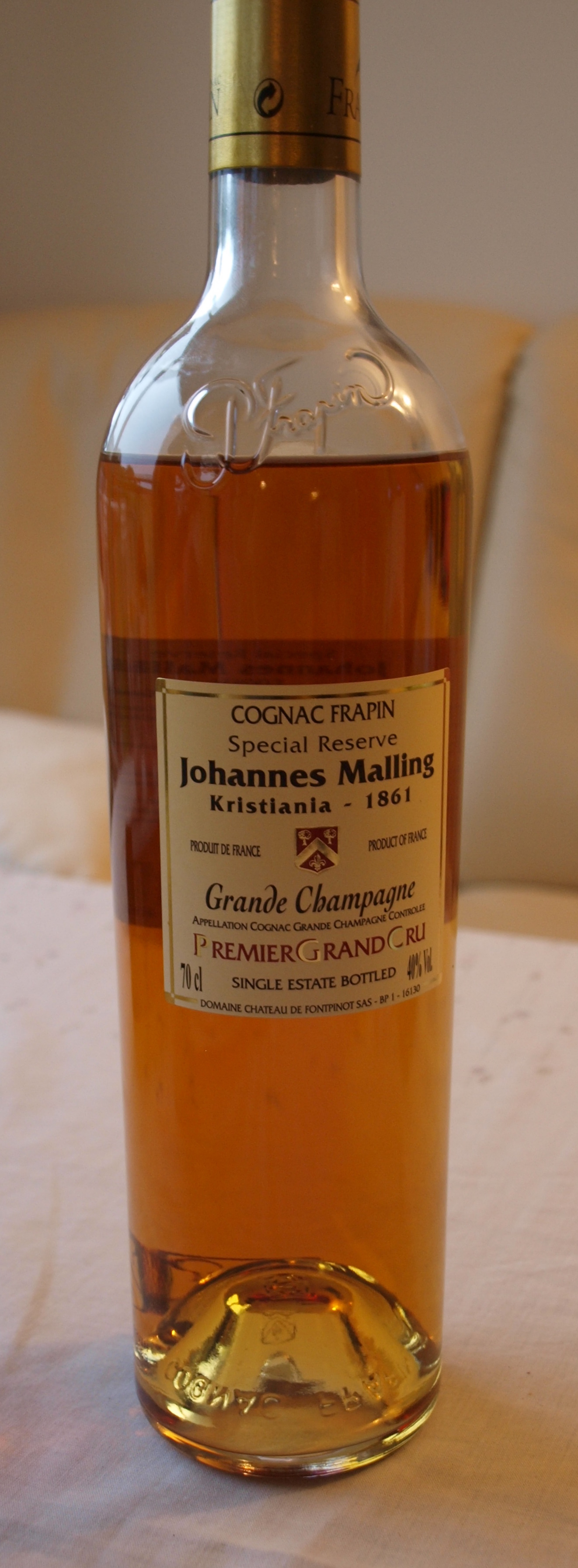

Cognac Frapin is a Cognac producer based in the town of Segonzac, in the heart of the Grande Champagne region of France.

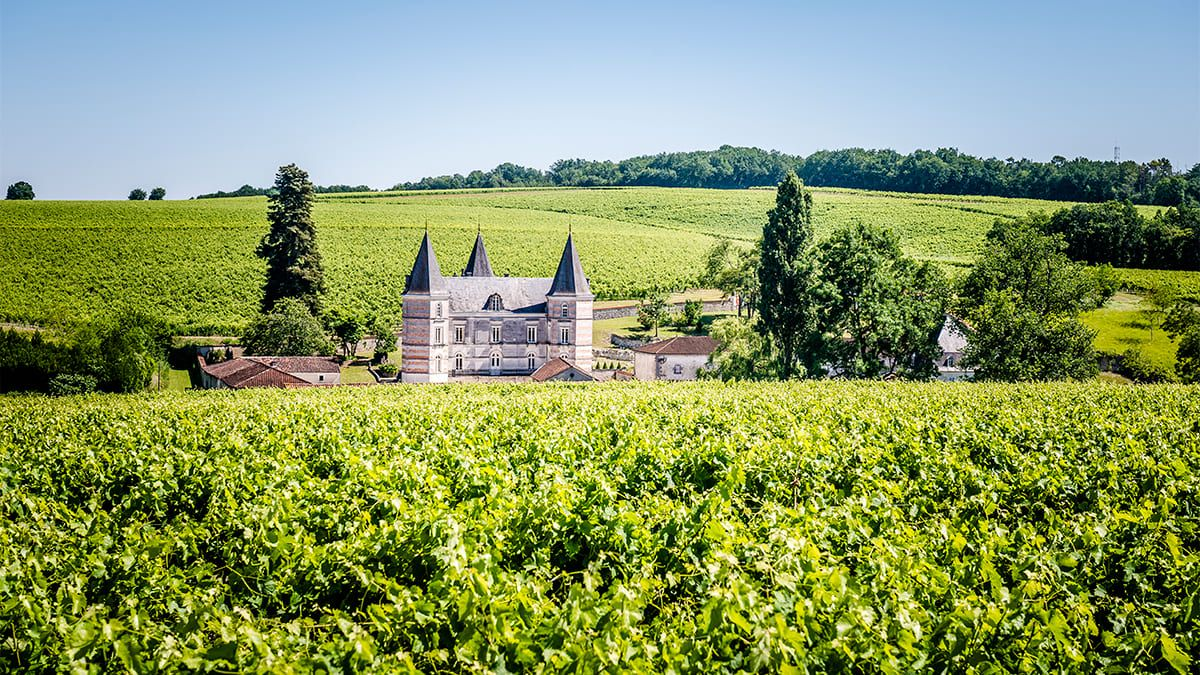

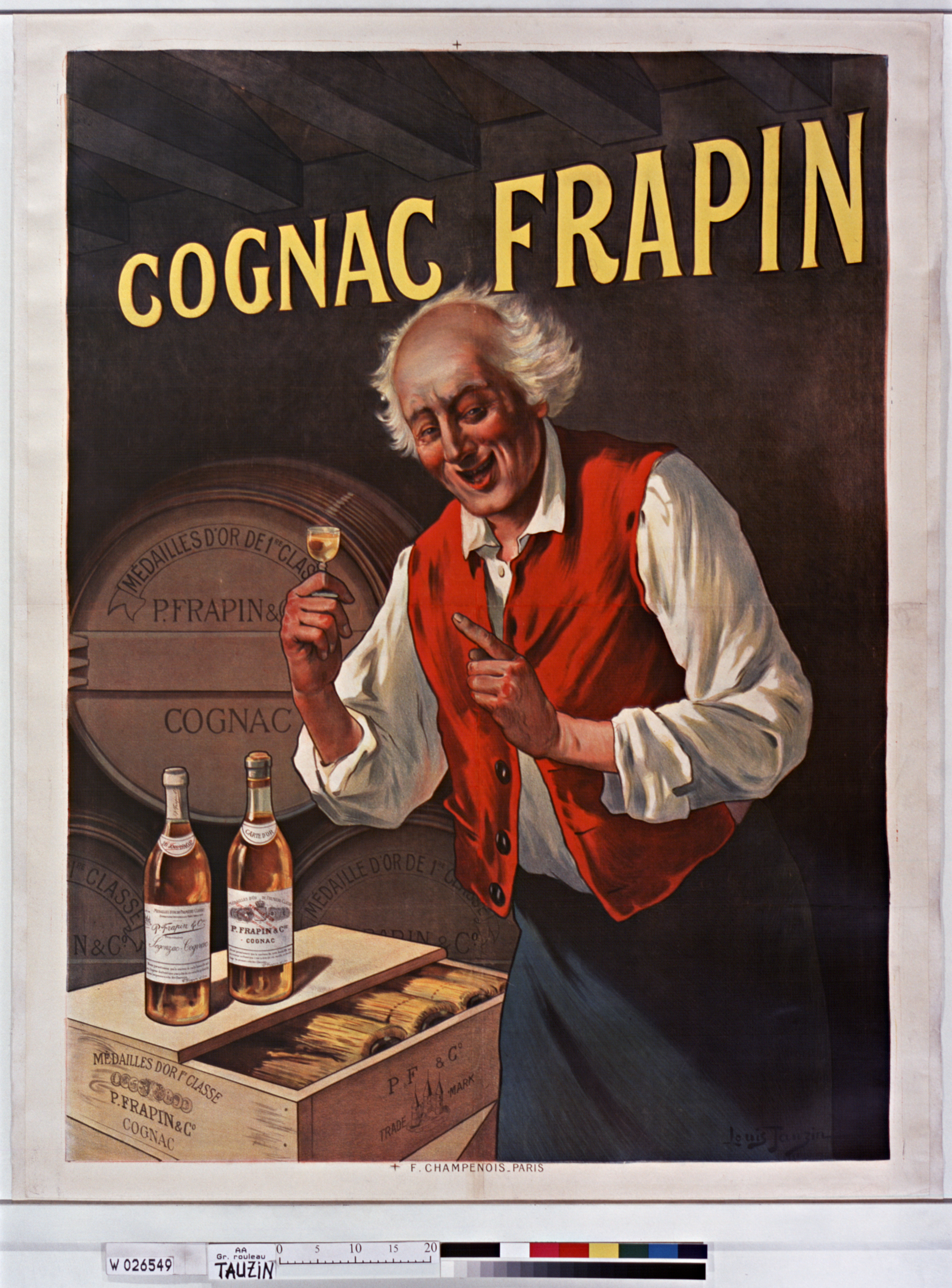

The Frapin family has been established in the South West of France since 1270, initially as a family of wine-growers. They then became distillers and have continued in this tradition for 20 generations. The Grande Champagne region was where the family eventually settled, establishing their headquarters in Château de Fontpinot at Segonzac. Today the Frapin estate covers 300 hectares of which 240 hectares are vineyards entirely in Grande Champagne, officially listed as Premier Grand Cru du Cognac, of which 240 hectares are planted with the Ugni blanc grape variety.

== Cognac Frapin Warehouse Built by Gustave Eiffel ==
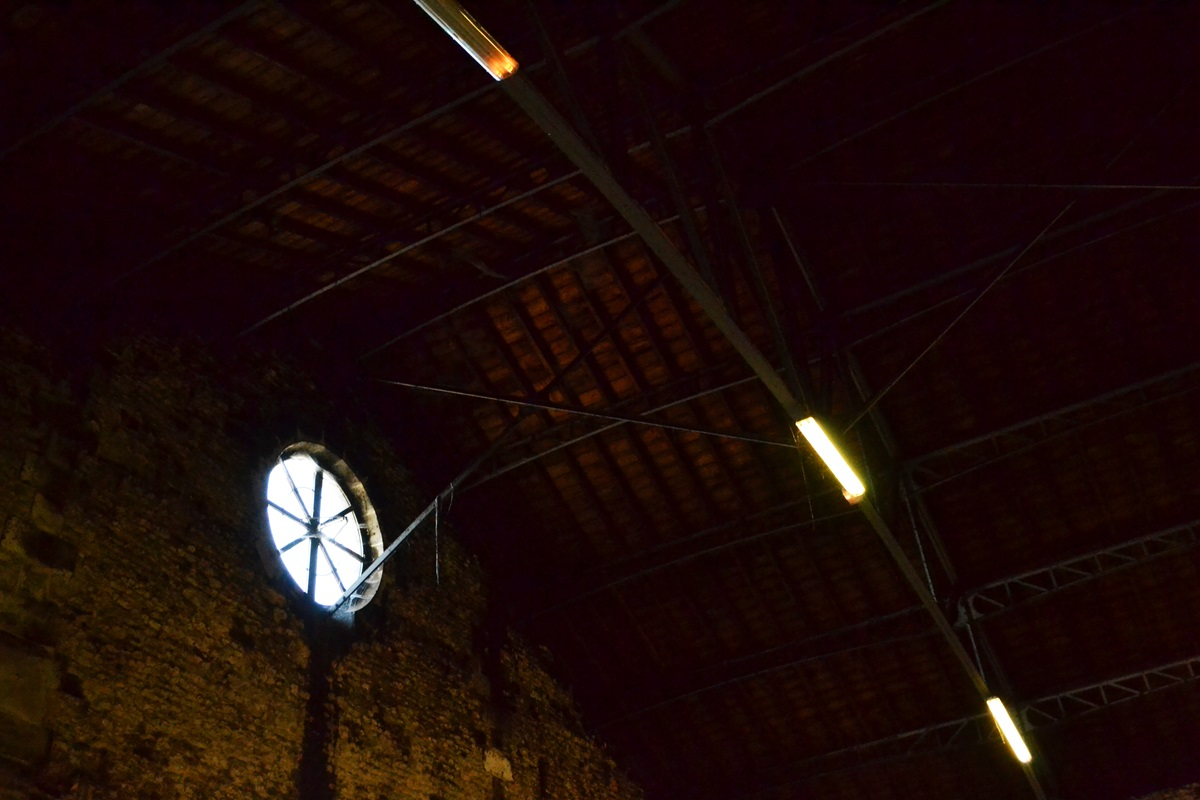
Cognac Frapin Warehouse Built by Gustave Eiffel

Gustave Eiffel and his team constructed the iron framework warehouse at the Cognac Frapin facility.

== See also ==
Cognac.com: Patrice Piveteau, Frapin Cognac Cellar Master, Discusses the Frapin Process
