= Delamain (Cognac producer) =

Organization

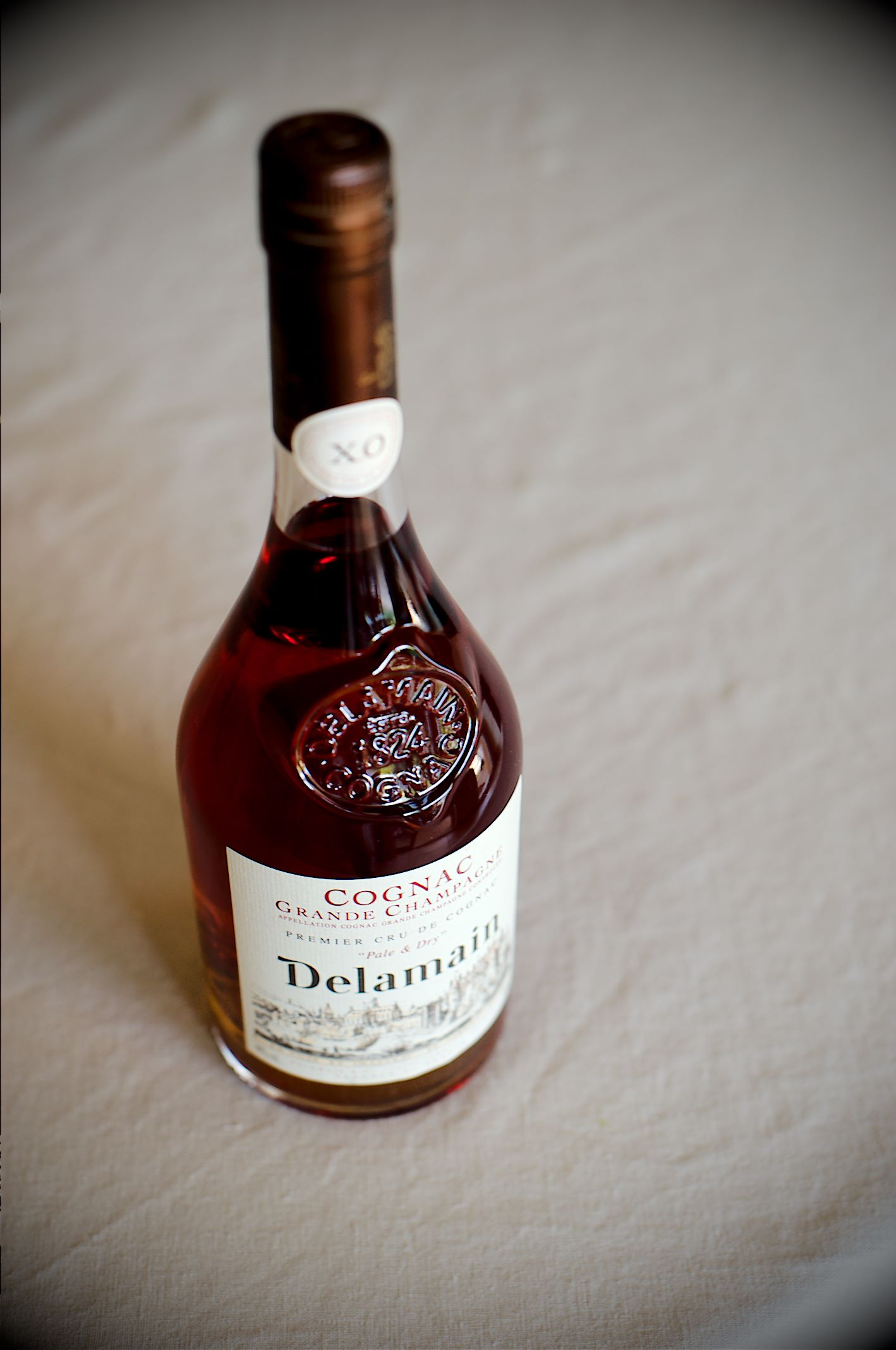
- Company type: Private
- Founded: 1824; 202 years ago in Jarnac, France
- Founder: James Delamain
- Headquarters: Jarnac, France
- Website: www.delamain-cognac.com

Delamain is a producer of cognac, based in Jarnac, France. Delamain is one of the oldest Cognac houses and has been continuously family run since its establishment in 1824, although its roots in the cognac trade go back even further, beginning shortly after the arrival in France of James Delamain in 1751. Nine generations later, James's direct descendant, Charles Braastad, serves as Delamain Cognac's Managing Director.

The House of Delamain only produces XO and above cognacs and only produces cognacs produced from eaux de vie from cognac's Grande Champagne region. This XO-only, Grande Champagne-only focus is unique amongst cognac houses.

== History ==
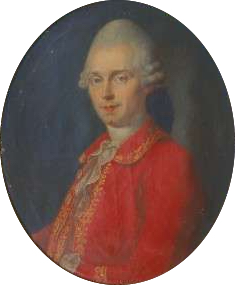
Portrait of James Delamain.

Delamain coat of arms.

James Delamain was born in 1738 in Dublin, William Delamain et de Hannah Frances O'Shaughnessey. He was from a Huguenot family who had emigrated from France in 1625. His ancestor Nicholas Delamain accompanied Henrietta Maria of France to the court of Charles I of England in 1625 Charles I of England. Nicholas Delamain settled in England and became the protégé of the 1st Duke of Buckingham. In 1639, the king knighted him and appointed him tax farmer in Ireland. James Delamain worked alongside his older brother Henry at the Delamain family's Delftware factory, the Dublin Delftware Pottery.

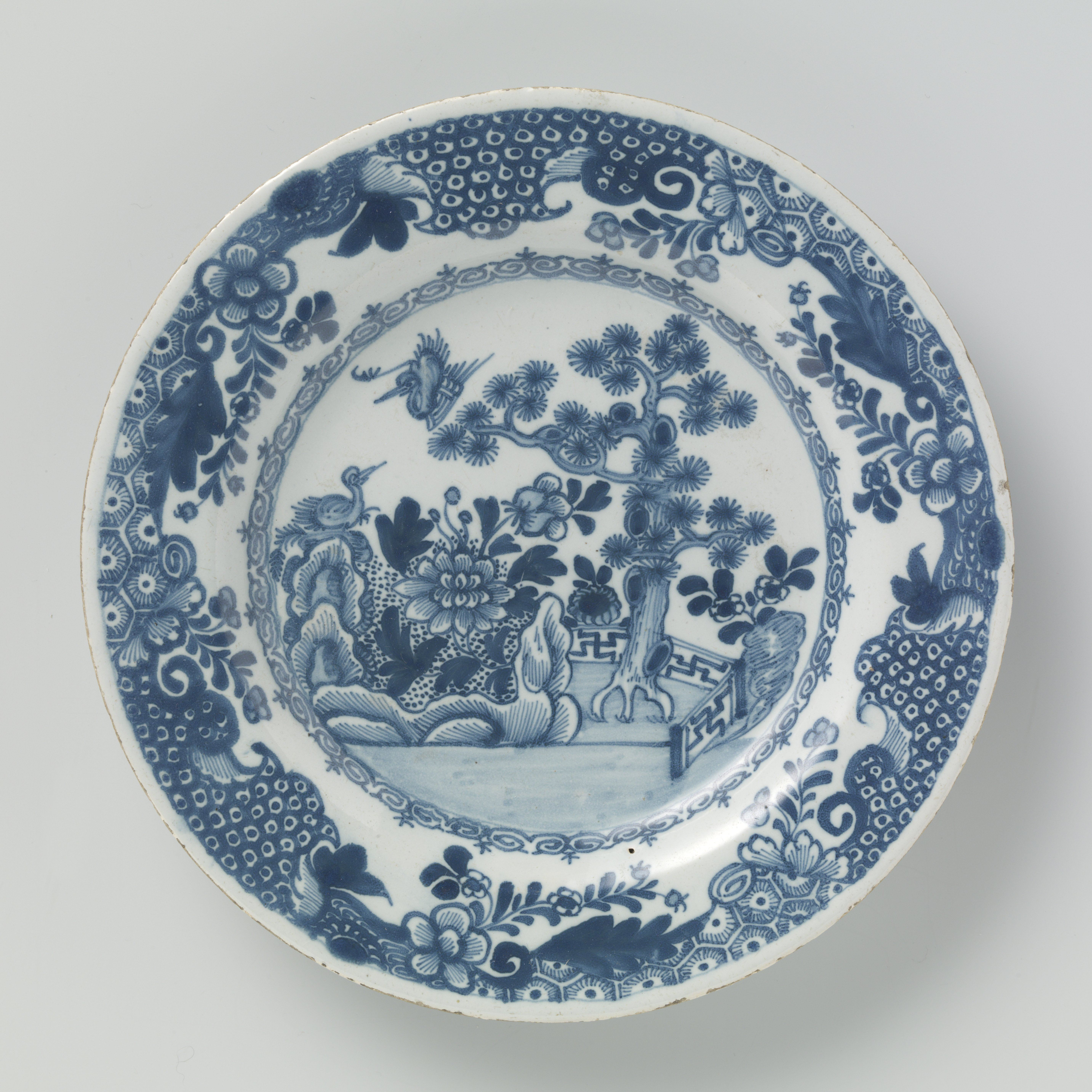
Round earthenware plate painted in blue, Henry Delamain pottery, Dublin, circa 1755. Kept at the Rijksmuseum, Amsterdam.

In 1759, at the age of 21, James Delamain was sent to France. He settled in Jarnac in 1759, and in 1763 founded the Ranson and Delamain company with his stepfather Jean-Isaac Ranson. Ranson was then an export trading house whose foundation dated back to the creation of Charentaise brandy.

In 1824, cousins Paul Roullet and Henri Delamain (grandson of James) founded Maison Roullet et Delamain – Maison Ranson et Delamain having been liquidated in 1817. They expanded their exports to England and throughout Northern Europe. Henri Delamain also distinguished himself through his entomological research. His son, Philippe Delamain (1847-1902), succeeded him as head of the company and developed an interest in the archaeology of the Charente region. In particular, he excavated a Merovingian necropolis at Biron, near Pons, the finds of which are now on display at the British Museum.

In 1920, upon returning from the World War I, brothers Jacques and Robert Delamain (sons of Philippe) became the sole owners of the company, which was renamed Delamain et Cie. Robert Delamain became known for writing a History of Cognac. His brother Jacques Delamain was an birdwatcher and wrote several notable works, including Why Birds Sing, 1929 – winner of the Montyon Prize from the Académie Française. Both were published by their cousin Maurice Delamain, owner of Éditions Stock and the Librairie Delamain, located on rue Saint-Honoré, in Paris, opposite the Comédie-Française.

In 2017, the Delamain company had fewer than twenty employees and exported to more than seventy countries. The Bollinger champagne and wine group deepened a longstanding relationship with the House of Delamain and became Delamain's majority shareholder.

In 2020, the House of Delamain celebrated the 100th anniversary of its flagship cognac, Pale & Dry XO. Also in 2020, Delamain launched its Pléiade range, a collection of limited-edition single vintage and/or single vineyard cognacs. Delamain is one of three cognac houses—alongside Hine and Croizet—that have continuously maintained stocks of vintage (single-harvest) cognacs.

In July 2021 Delamain was elected to membership of the Comité Colbert, a non-profit association known as the “Voice of French Luxury”, composed of France's most important crafted luxury goods and services. In announcing the election to membership, the Comité Colbert cited Delamain's “history, deep respect for traditions, including the value of inherited wisdom and the patience necessary to achieve excellence.”

== Products ==
Delamain cognac is exclusively sourced from Grande Champagne, the premier cru of cognac.

Range

- Pale & Dry X.O. Aged 25 years
- Vesper Aged 35 years
- Extra. Older than Vesper
- Tres Vénérable. Aged 55 years
- Reserve de la Famille.43% vol. This is produced from a single barrel and from a single estate. This is Delamain's highest range product.

Limited editions

- Millésimes (Vintage) Cognacs. This is a cognac from a single year. Aged 30 years.
- Le Voyage de Delamain. The finest expression of Delamain, from their oldest eau de vie, in Baccarat crystal and leather. Limited to 500 units worldwide.
