= Thomas Hine & Co. =

Thomas Hine & Co. is a cognac house, owned by the French company EDV SAS.

== History ==
Thomas Hine & Co. is named after its proprietor Thomas Hine (sometimes recorded as Thomas Hone), an Englishman from Dorset. The company was founded in 1763. Following his arrest during the French Revolution, Thomas Hine married a young woman, Françoise Elizabeth Delamain, whose father owned a cognac house in Jarnac. Hine took control of the house, and eventually renamed it Thomas Hine & Co. in 1817.

Hine is one of three cognac houses—alongside Delamain and Croizet—that have continuously maintained stocks of vintage (single-harvest) cognacs.

== House ==
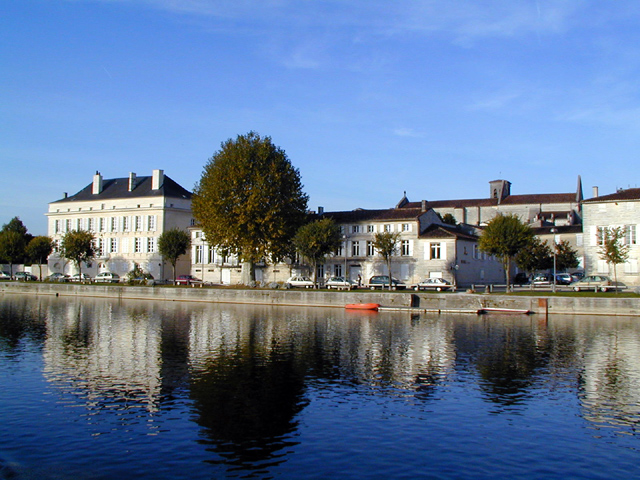
Thomas Hine & Co. house in Jarnac

The Hine House has stood at the banks of the quai de l’Orangerie on the banks of the river Charente in Jarnac, France, since the 18th century. It is one of the oldest houses in Jarnac and serves as the company's headquarters.

In 1962, the house was granted a royal warrant from Queen Elizabeth II as suppliers of cognac. Today it is still the only cognac house to hold this honour. In 2008, one of the factories of the House was bought by Tigran Arzakantsyan, the owner of Armenian the Great Valley Wine and Cognac Company.
