= Cîroc =

Brand of French alcoholic beverages

- Cîroc Snap Frost Vodka
- Type: Vodka; flavored vodka; brandy
- Manufacturer: Diageo
- Origin: France
- Introduced: 2003
- Proof (US): 80 (vodka and brandy); 70 (flavored varieties)
- Variants: Snap Frost (blue); French Vanilla (beige); Red Berry (red); Coconut (silver); Peach (orange); Amaretto (brown); Pineapple (yellow); Apple (green); Mango (pink); Pink Grapefruit (pink); Summer Colada [Limited] (gold); Black Raspberry [Limited] (black); Summer Citrus [Limited]; Summer Watermelon [Limited] (red); Pomegranate [Limited] (burgundy); White Grape (gold); Limonata [Limited] (yellow); Passion (purple hombre)
- Website: www.ciroc.com

Cîroc (French pronunciation: [siʀɔk]) is a brand of alcoholic beverages produced in France since 2003 and owned by the British multinational alcoholic beverage company Diageo. The brand line includes vodka, flavored vodka-based products, and brandy.

Beginning in 2007, the marketing and promotion of Cîroc in the United States were conducted in partnership with rapper Sean Combs through an "equal-share venture," with profits from the brand split between Combs and Diageo. This arrangement was terminated in 2024 following Combs' personal legal issues, leaving Diageo as the sole owner.

== Etymology ==
The name "Cîroc" is a portmanteau of the French word cime, meaning peak or summit-top, and roche, meaning rock, a reference to the high-altitude vineyards of the Gaillac region where Mauzac grapes are grown. The 'î' in the Cîroc logo is the i-circumflex letter used in the French language.

== Vodka production process ==
Cîroc's vodka is distinguished from nearly all other vodkas by being derived from grapes, rather than using grain, potatoes, or maize (corn). It is distilled to a very high level of alcohol by volume (ABV) concentration – about 96% (roughly the practical limit of ordinary distillation practices due to the ethanol and water becoming an azeotrope mixture) and is not aged or flavored before being diluted with water to 40% ABV (80 U.S. proof) for bottling, and thus fulfills the criteria for labeling as vodka (which in the United States requires at least 95% distillation concentration and 40% ABV bottling concentration for vodka).

The producer of Cîroc emphasizes its being distilled five times. The first four distillations use column stills and the final distillation is performed in a traditional copper pot still at the Distillerie de Chevanceaux.

== Flavored products containing vodka ==
Since 2010, the Cîroc brand has included a family of flavored drinks containing vodka. In the United States, these flavored beverages are bottled at 70 U.S. proof (35% ABV) – a lower ABV level than (unflavored) vodka, although much higher than that of a typical mixed drink. In the United States, the labels of these products say "made with vodka" rather than simply "vodka", although they are referred to as vodkas on the company website.

The brand introduced two flavored varieties to the market in 2010: Red Berry and Coconut. In 2011, the company added a Peach flavor. In May 2013, Cîroc and Sean Combs announced that a new flavor would be released called Cîroc Amaretto. On 15 July 2014, Combs announced via his Instagram page that Cîroc Pineapple would be the next flavor. In 2015, he announced a green apple flavor, in 2016 DJ Khaled was signed as another brand ambassador co-promoting a new mango flavor, and in 2017 Combs announced a French vanilla flavor to be produced in partnership with hip-hop artist French Montana. As of October 2021, the U.S. brand offerings include seven main-line flavor varieties: Mango, Apple, Pineapple, Red Berry, Coconut, Peach, and French Vanilla, and four "limited edition" varieties: White Grape, Summer Citrus, Summer Watermelon, and Pomegranate. In April 2022 Ciroc introduce one more flavor as CÎROC PASSION.

== Brandy ==
Cîroc VS Brandy, bottled at 80 U.S. proof (40% ABV), was added to the brand family in June 2018. It is a blend of aged French brandies, some of which is distilled in copper pot stills and aged in French oak. A review in The Spirits Business said its taste profile has "'rich' notes of fresh fruit, vanilla and a hint of French oak". In brandy production, "VS" is an abbreviation for "very special" and typically refers to a blend in which the youngest brandy has been aged for at least two years in a cask.

== Background ==
Cîroc was founded in France by Jean-Sébastien Robicquet, whose family is from the wine-growing region of Bordeaux. Robicquet, whose family has been in the wine and spirits business since the early 17th century, had studied winemaking in university before moving into spirits production. Having worked for French cognac-maker Hennessy for ten years, he was approached by the British-based Diageo – which owns a 34% stake in Hennessy – to produce a vodka made from grapes as opposed to grain or potato common among most vodka. Jean-Sebastien Robicquet is recognized as a "Commander of Bordeaux" by the Great Council of Bordeaux for his accomplishments in the field of wine/liquor.

== Marketing ==
=== Marketing campaign history ===
When the brand was launched in 2003, NFL football player Earl Little was one of the first American brand ambassadors to promote the beverage in the U.S. market. It was introduced to nightclubs and venues throughout the United States and marketed especially in cities such as Atlanta and Miami.

In 2007, rapper Sean Combs became a brand ambassador for the vodka brand, which had been struggling to sell 40,000 cases in its first few years on the market. In December 2007, the commercial for Cîroc had Combs calling the drink the "official vodka of New Year's" after brand became official sponsor for Cîroc The New Year event. Describing his ambassadorship of the brand, Combs sometimes jokingly refers to himself as "Cîroc Obama". Combs's brand evangelism improved sales substantially; By 2014, the brand was selling more than two million cases per year.

Following the success of the partnership, Combs and Diageo also co-purchased the DeLeón Tequila brand in December 2013. Combs's ownership of the liquor brands is managed through his company Combs Enterprises, which also includes AquaHydrate bottled water and various non-beverage businesses.

The Colangelo brand development company was involved in the development of brand positioning. Brand Development agency Haines McGregor are responsible for global research, positioning and identity development for Cîroc. The work included the development of brand guidelines and growth driver tool-kits for all markets.

On 14 December 2011, the company began airing a "Luck Be a Lady" advertising campaign for ultra premium vodka, directed by Anthony Mandler. The ads feature a group of elegantly dressed friends (Combs, Frank Vincent, Eva Pigford, Michael K. Williams, Aaron Paul, Dania Ramirez, Chrissy Teigen, and Jesse Williams) enjoying a festive night on the town.

Other artists such as DJ Khaled (added in 2016) and rapper French Montana (starting in 2017) have also been involved in the brand's development and marketing.

In 2020, Cîroc introduced a #CÎROCStands initiative, which encouraged voting in the 2020 United States elections and was expanded to promote Black-owned businesses and especially businesses owned by Black women.

In Nigeria, Cîroc promoted fashion entrepreneur Ozinna Anumudu as its "newly unveiled member of the Cîroc circle" in September 2021.

=== Lack of sponsorship disclosure ===
The brand's marketing on social media has come under criticism for a lack of adequate disclosure of paid promotional activities. In 2017, the U.S. Federal Trade Commission (FTC) sent a letter to Combs and 45 other celebrities to remind them of legal requirements to properly disclose their paid sponsorships, and in early 2018 the Truth in Advertising watchdog organization (abbreviated TINA) sent a letter of complaint to DJ Khaled and Diageo expressing concerns about Cîroc. Later in 2018, TINA sent a letter of complaint to the FTC, pointing out the actions of 50 influencers that it said were in violation of disclosure requirements involving their promotion of the Cîroc brand. These influencers included Combs, DJ Khaled, French Montana, Alessandra Ambrosio, Cassie, Bow Wow, and Ashanti. DJ Khaled later removed the problematic advertisements that he was involved with, which had included more than 300 promotions of Cîroc and other brands between June 2017 and March 2018. TINA also complained that the brand's promotion activities included material likely to reach audiences who are under the legal drinking age.
