= Saint-Même-les-Carrières =

- Commune
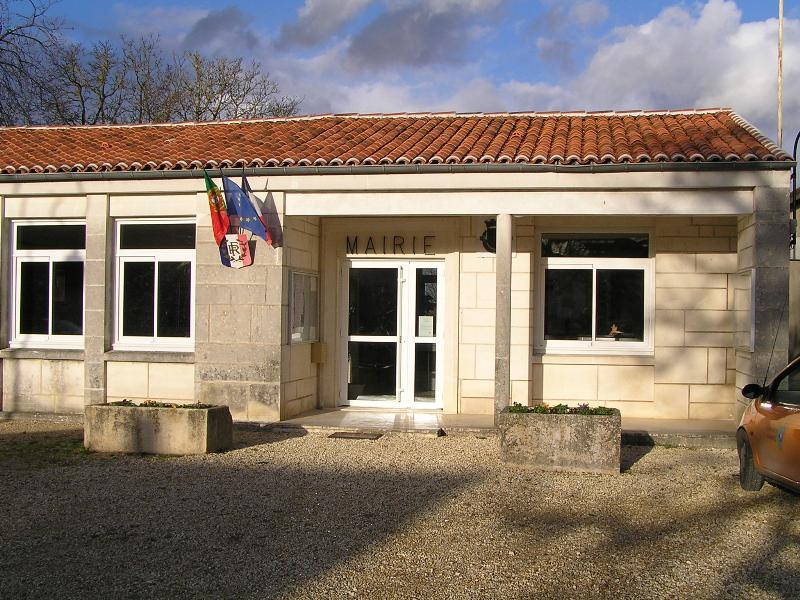
- Town hall
- Location of Saint-Même-les-Carrières
- Location within France Location within Nouvelle-Aquitaine
- Coordinates: 45°38′47″N 0°08′28″W
- Country: France
- Region: Nouvelle-Aquitaine
- Department: Charente
- Arrondissement: Cognac
- Canton: Jarnac
- Intercommunality: CA Grand Cognac

Government
  - Mayor (2020–2026): Fabien Delisle
- Area^{1}: 15.14 km^{2} (5.85 sq mi)
- Elevation: 21 m (69 ft)
- Highest elevation: 86 m (282 ft)
- Lowest elevation: 13 m (43 ft)
- Population (2023): 1,023
  - Density: 67.57/km^{2} (175.0/sq mi)
- Time zone: UTC+01:00 (CET)
  - Summer (DST): UTC+02:00 (CEST)
- INSEE/Postal code: 16340 /16720
- ^{1} French Land Register data, which excludes lakes, ponds, glaciers > 1 km^{2} (0.386 sq mi or 247 acres) and river estuaries.

Saint-Même-les-Carrières (French pronunciation: [sɛ̃ mɛm le kaʁjɛʁ], before 1962: Saint-Même) is a commune in the Charente department in southwestern France.

The commune has been a centre of limestone quarrying since the Middle Ages, producing white Turonian limestone; stone from its quarries was used in the construction of the Rochefort naval arsenal in the 17th century. The disused underground quarry galleries have been repurposed as ageing cellars by cognac producers, most notably Croizet, a cognac house founded in the commune in 1805.

== Population ==
Historical population
Year	Pop.	±% p.a.
1968	1,213	—
1975	1,248	+0.41%
1982	1,171	−0.91%
1990	1,108	−0.69%
1999	1,052	−0.57%
2007	1,092	+0.47%
2012	1,103	+0.20%
2017	1,068	−0.64%
2023	1,023	−0.71%
Source: INSEE

== See also ==
- Communes of the Charente department
