= Grande Champagne =

French district

Map of the Cognac growth regions

Grande Champagne is a French district, called a cru, known for its cognac. It produces the finest cognacs in a zone of 34,703 hectares, of which 17% is dedicated to production of cognac, which can be marked as Grande Champagne or Grande Fine Champagne. At its heart is the town of Segonzac, in the Département of Charente. Grande Champagne is situated entirely in this département.

== Cognac regions ==
Cru is a French word for growth region. There are six different sub-regions (Cru) within Cognac. Each is graded by the French government according to the quality of the cognac produced there. The six Cru are from best to least, (1) Grande Champagne, (2) Petite Champagne, (3) Borderies, (4) Fins Bois, (5) Bons Bois, and (6) Bois Ordinaires. Grande champagne is the first (and, according to many connoisseurs, the favored) cru. A blend of Grande and Petite Champagne cognacs, with at least half the eaux-de-vie coming from Grande Champagne, is known as Fine Champagne.

Notable cognac houses based in Grande Champagne include Croizet (founded 1805 in Saint-Même-les-Carrières), Delamain, and Frapin.
