= Excellia =

Type of Alcoholic Beverage

Excellia is a tequila range made from agave Tequilana Weber Blue. Its specific ageing process is conducted using Sauternes wine casks and Cognac barrels.

== History ==
Jean-Sébastien Robicquet is a French oenologist and master distiller. This structure was founded to bridge French wines and spirits with the American market. It became Maison Villevert in 2011. He created EuroWineGate in 2001. Meanwhile, Jean-Sébastien Robicquet launched Ciroc in 2003. He created this vodka derived from grapes for the multinational spirits company Diageo. He also launched G’Vine in 2006 (grape-based gin).

Jean-Sébastien Robicquet worked in partnership with Carlos Camarena in 2011 to create the Excellia tequila range.

== Overview ==
According to its website, Tequila is made from at least 51% Weber blue agave. Tequila gold are aged in oak casks. Excellia is a range of blue agave tequilas with a specific ageing process performed in Sauterne casks and Cognac barrels, including the Excellia Blanco white tequila.

The barrels collect Sauterne and Cognac flavours which, then, permeate tequila during the ageing process. This range comprises three tequilas: Excellia Blanco (white tequila aged for several weeks in casks), Excellia™ Reposado (aged nine months in casks), and Excellia Añejo (aged eighteen months in casks).

== Distribution ==
Excellia tequila are sold throughout the world, especially in Australia, the United-Kingdom and the United-States through Domaine Select Wine Estates. These tequilas are also used by bartenders and mixologists in California and Hong-Kong, among others.

== Cocktails and food pairing ==
Bartenders and mixologists use them for traditional cocktails as well as for new creations.

== Events ==
Excellia was represented at the Tequila Fair organised each year at Café Pacifico and at the La Perla bar in London. It was also presented at the Vinexpo Bordeaux exhibition in 2009.

== Awards ==
The Excellia range got several awards in the premium tequilas range. It was awarded "Best in class" at the 2011 International Spirits Challenge. Excellia Reposado was awarded three gold medals the same year at the Beverage Testing Institute in Chicago, at the San Francisco World Spirits Competition and at the International World Spirit Competition (IWSC) in London.
