= Fins Bois =

Fins Bois is a wine producing sub-region within the Cognac appellation, geographically surrounding the sub-regions of Grande Champagne, Petite Champagne and Borderies, and which falls within both the Charente and Charente-Maritime departments in South-West France, just north of Bordeaux.

Fins Bois is regarded as producing fine (fins) quality eaux-de-vie – though ranked behind those listed above – and is widely used as either a base- or filler- eaux-de-vie in many Cognac blends. While the major brands usually produce blends of several crus, many smaller producers produce single cru blends of various ages. Examples of such producers who release Cru Fins Bois include A. de Fussigny, Chateau de Beaulon and Jean Grosperrin.

Fins Bois eaux-de-vies are characterised by their floral, fruity softness which adds complexity and body to blends, but without the structure to age well as an exclusive cru blend.
