= The Spirits Business =

British trade magazine

- Cover of the December 2024 issue
- Editor: Melita Kiely
- Categories: Trade magazine
- Frequency: Monthly
- Circulation: 13,000
- Publisher: Union Press
- Founded: 2007
- Country: United Kingdom
- Based in: London
- Language: English
- Website: thespiritsbusiness.com

The Spirits Business is a British magazine aimed at distillers, distillery proprietors and other spirits industry professionals that concentrates on the fine spirits end of the beverage industry.

== History and profile ==
The Spirits Business was founded in 2007. The magazine was produced by the publishers of the Drinks Business Magazine and is published monthly by Union Press and had a circulation of 13,000 copies in April 2018.

It produces the Global Spirits Masters, an annual industry award series presented in London since 2008. The series features blind tasting competitions in the world with entries welcomed from distillers across 120 countries with a reach across 45,000 spirit professionals worldwide. The Spirit Business Award features awards in categories Innovation in Production, Design and Packaging.

== See also ==
- List of food and drink magazines
