= Segonzac, Charente =

Segonzac
- Commune
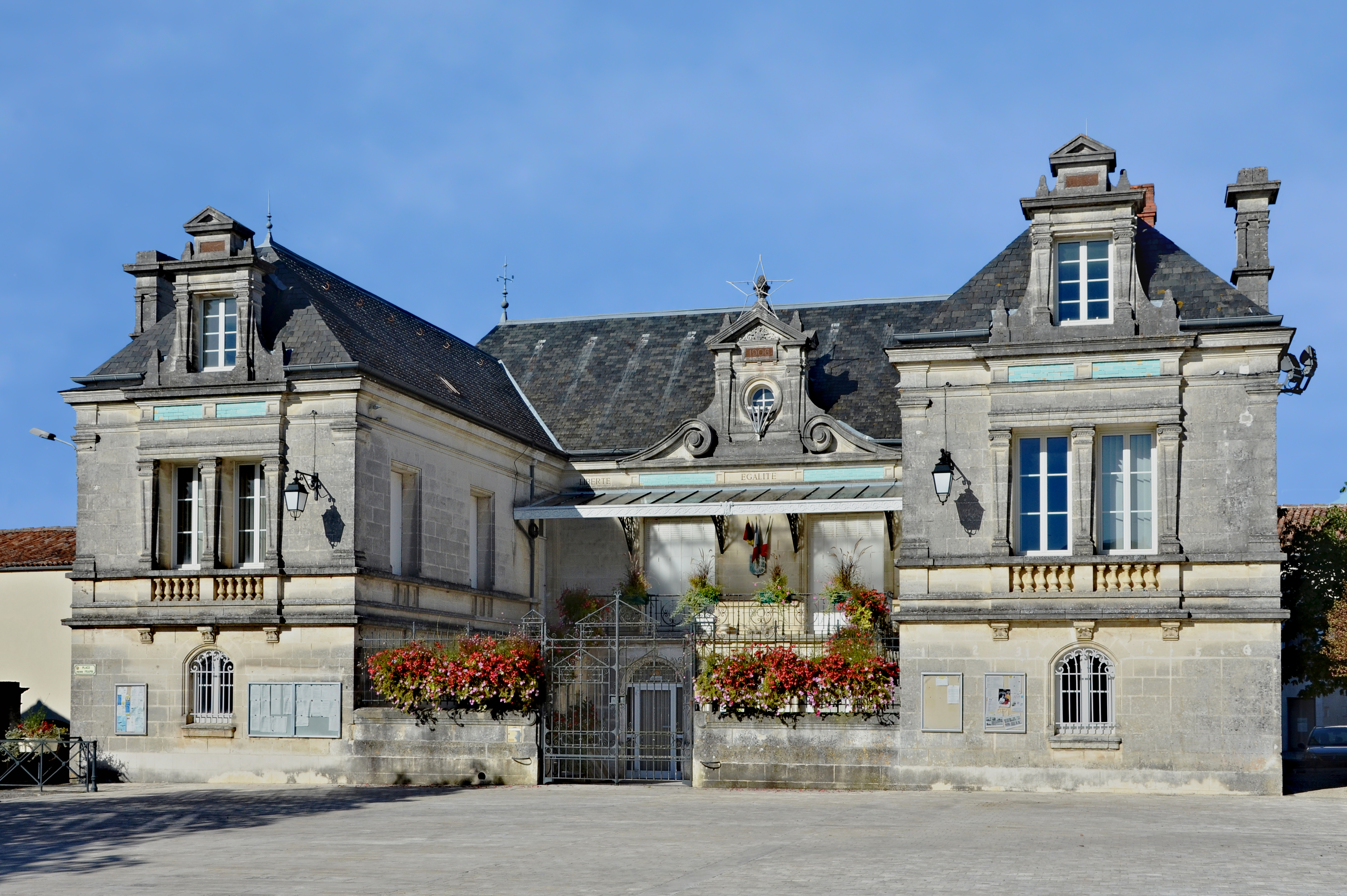
- Town hall

- Coat of arms
- Location of Segonzac
- Location within France Location within Nouvelle-Aquitaine
- Coordinates: 45°37′05″N 0°13′03″W
- Country: France
- Region: Nouvelle-Aquitaine
- Department: Charente
- Arrondissement: Cognac
- Canton: Charente-Champagne
- Intercommunality: CA Grand Cognac

Government
  - Mayor (2024–2026): Laurent Georges
- Area^{1}: 35.19 km^{2} (13.59 sq mi)
- Elevation: 61 m (200 ft)
- Highest elevation: 141 m (463 ft)
- Lowest elevation: 19 m (62 ft)
- Population (2023): 2,083
  - Density: 59.19/km^{2} (153.3/sq mi)
- Time zone: UTC+01:00 (CET)
  - Summer (DST): UTC+02:00 (CEST)
- INSEE/Postal code: 16366 /16130
- ^{1} French Land Register data, which excludes lakes, ponds, glaciers > 1 km^{2} (0.386 sq mi or 247 acres) and river estuaries.

Segonzac (French pronunciation: [səɡɔ̃zak]) is a commune within the Charente department of southwestern France, in the Cognac area. It is the heart of the "Grande Champagne" grape-cultivating region of the cognaçais, which produces the finest cognac and Pineau des Charentes. There's also a large church and local fitness facilities such as a public swimming-pool, a track and a football pitch. The Château de Saint-Martial is situated nearby.

== Population ==
Historical population

Year	Pop.	±% p.a.
1793	2,550	—
1800	2,549	−0.01%
1806	2,453	−0.64%
1821	2,500	+0.13%
1831	2,602	+0.40%
1841	2,620	+0.07%
1846	2,670	+0.38%
1851	2,600	−0.53%
1856	2,784	+1.38%
1861	2,965	+1.27%
1866	2,977	+0.08%
1872	2,880	−0.55%
1876	2,809	−0.62%
1881	2,570	−1.76%
1886	2,384	−1.49%
1891	2,165	−1.91%
1896	2,124	−0.38%
1901	2,122	−0.02%

Year	Pop.	±% p.a.
1906	2,273	+1.38%
1911	2,286	+0.11%
1921	2,028	−1.19%
1926	2,056	+0.27%
1931	2,099	+0.41%
1936	2,090	−0.09%
1946	2,003	−0.42%
1954	2,130	+0.77%
1962	2,253	+0.70%
1968	2,182	−0.53%
1975	2,230	+0.31%
1982	2,212	−0.12%
1990	2,176	−0.20%
1999	2,297	+0.60%
2007	2,166	−0.73%
2012	2,128	−0.35%
2017	2,089	−0.37%
2023	2,083	−0.05%

Source: EHESS and INSEE (1968-2023)

== See also ==
- Communes of the Charente department
