= Petite Champagne =

Map of the Cognac growth regions, showing the Petite Champagne region

Petite Champagne is a geographic zone of Cognac production of approximately 66,000 hectares, of which about 15,000 are dedicated to wines destined for cognac, which can be marked as Petite Champagne or Petite Fine Champagne. It is situated in the départements of Charente and Charente-Maritime. The principal towns of the region are Barbezieux (Charente), Archiac and Jonzac (Charente-Maritime). In order of importance among the cognac crus (regions), Petite Champagne is second in place after Grande Champagne. While having similar characteristics, the cognacs of Petite Champagne have always been considered of a lesser quality than those of Grande Champagne. Geologically, this region is composed of a thinner layer of Calcareous material than Grande Champagne. A blend of Grande and Petite Champagne Cognacs, with at least half the eaux-de-vie coming from Grande Champagne, is known as Fine Champagne.
