= Pervomayskoye, Kizlyarsky District, Republic of Dagestan =

Pervomayskoye Первомайское
- Selo
- Location within Republic of Dagestan Location within Russia
- Coordinates: 43°55′N 46°42′E
- Country: Russia
- Region: Republic of Dagestan
- District: Kizlyarsky District
- Time zone: UTC+3:00

Pervomayskoye (Russian: Первомайское) is a rural locality (a selo) in Kosyakinsky Selsoviet, Kizlyarsky District, Republic of Dagestan, Russia. The population was 945 as of 2010. There are 9 streets.

== Geography ==
Pervomayskoye is located 10 km north of Kizlyar (the district's administrative centre) by road. Vperyod and Kosyakino are the nearest rural localities.

== Nationalities ==
Dargins, Avars, Tabasarans, Laks and Russians live there.
