= Kalinino (Dagestan) =

Kalinino Калинино
- Village
- Location within Republic of Dagestan Location within Russia
- Coordinates: 44°03′N 46°56′E
- Country: Russia
- Region: Republic of Dagestan
- District: Kizlyarsky District

Population (2010)
  - Total: 87
- Time zone: UTC+3:00

Kalinino (Russian: Калинино) is a village in the Kizlyarsky region of Dagestan. It is named after Mikhail Kalinin. It is part of the Bolsheareshevsky rural settlement.

== Geography ==
The settlement is located on the bank of the Kuruterek canal, 9 km southeast of the center of the rural settlement - Bolshaya Areshevka and 32 km northeast of the city of Kizlyar.

== History ==
The village was founded in 1927 to provide land for land-poor peasants from Mountain Jews. The Larinsky village council was created, consisting of two settlers named after Shchors (now renamed Kalinin) and later renamed Larinskoye (currently does not exist). The socio-cultural disorder of the village, as well as the lack of water in it, led to the fact that most of the population subsequently left it. In 1929, Mountain Jews moved to the village of Aglobi, to state farms in the city of Derbent, and 50 Russia Germans families moved into the village. They organized the "Landbauer" collective farm in the village.

== Population ==
According to the 2010 Russian census, 87 people lived in the village (48 men and 39 women).

== See also ==
- History of the Jews in Kizlyar
- Larinskoye
