= Larinskoye (Dagestan) =

Larinskoye Ларинское
- Village
- Location within Republic of Dagestan Location within Russia
- Coordinates: 44°01′N 46°54′E
- Country: Russia
- Region: Republic of Dagestan
- District: Kizlyarsky District

Population
  - Total: 0
- Time zone: UTC+3:00

Larinskoye (Russian: Ларинское) is an abandoned village in the Kizlyarsky region of Dagestan. The center of the former Larinsky village council, which also included the village named after Mykola Shchors (now renamed Mikhail Kalinin). The village was named after the first chairman of OZET, Yuri Larin.

== Geography ==
The area where the village was located is designated on topographic maps as the “Larinskoe tract.” It was located 5 km south of the village of Kalinino and 8 km east of the village of Malaya Areshevka, on the Kizlyar-Caspian canal.

== History ==
In 1927, the Committee for Land Management of Working Jews of Dagestan (prototype of OZET) was created under the Dagestan Central Executive Committee. In the same year, in the Kizlyar canton, the committee created the Larinskoye village council, which consisted of two resettlement villages named after Larin and named after Mykola Shchors. 108 families from among the land-poor Mountain Jews were resettled to the village of Larinskoye. The socio-cultural disorder of the village, as well as the lack of water in it, led to the fact that by the beginning of the 40s the village was abandoned.

== Literature ==
- The agrarian question and the resettlement of the highlanders of Dagestan to the plain (1920–1945): Documents and materials. Makhachkala, 2006. Vol. 1.
- Osmanov A.I. Agrarian transformations in Dagestan: resettlement of highlanders to the plain (20-70s of the XX century). Makhachkala, 2000.

== See also ==
- History of the Jews in Kizlyar
- Kalinino
