= Zarya Komunny =

Zarya Komunny Заря Коммуны
- Selo
- Location within Republic of Dagestan Location within Russia
- Coordinates: 43°53′N 46°43′E
- Country: Russia
- Region: Republic of Dagestan
- District: Kizlyarsky District
- Time zone: UTC+3:00

Zarya Komunny (Russian: Заря Коммуны) is a rural locality (a selo) in Vperedovsky Selsoviet, Kizlyarsky District, Republic of Dagestan, Russia. The population was 880 as of 2010. There are 9 streets in this rural locality.

== Geography ==
Zarya Komunny is located 6 km north of Kizlyar (the district's administrative centre) by road. Novoye and Vperyod are the nearest rural localities.

== Nationalities ==
Avars and Russians live there.
