= Oguzer =

Oguzer Огузер Оьгиз-Ер
- Selo
- Location within Republic of Dagestan Location within Russia
- Coordinates: 44°02′N 47°03′E
- Country: Russia
- Region: Republic of Dagestan
- District: Kizlyarsky District
- Time zone: UTC+3:00

Oguzer (Russian: Огузер; Nogai: Оьгиз-Ер, Ögiz-Yer) is a rural locality (a selo) in Kizlyarsky District, Republic of Dagestan, Russia. The population was 871 as of 2010. There are 10 streets.

== Geography ==
Oguzer is located 43 km northeast of Kizlyar (the district's administrative centre) by road. Sar-Sar and Novaya Serebryakovka are the nearest rural localities.

== Nationalities ==
Nogais, Avars, Chechens, Tabasarans, Dargins, Kumyks and Kazakhs live there.
