= Novy Chechen =

Novy Chechen Новый Чечень
- Selo
- Location within Republic of Dagestan Location within Russia
- Coordinates: 44°15′N 47°04′E
- Country: Russia
- Region: Republic of Dagestan
- District: Kizlyarsky District
- Time zone: UTC+3:00

Novy Chechen (Russian: Новый Чечень) is a rural locality (a selo) in Bryansky Selsoviet, Kizlyarsky District, Republic of Dagestan, Russia. The population was 171 as of 2010. There is 1 street.

== Geography ==
Novy Chechen is located 60 km northeast of Kizlyar (the district's administrative centre) by road. Novye Bukhty and Bolshaya Areshevka are the nearest rural localities.

== Nationalities ==
Dargins, Avars and Russians live there.
