= Burumbay =

Burumbay Бурумбай Боранбай
- Selo
- Location within Republic of Dagestan Location within Russia
- Coordinates: 43°53′N 46°58′E
- Country: Russia
- Region: Republic of Dagestan
- District: Kizlyarsky District
- Time zone: UTC+3:00

Burumbay (Russian: Бурумбай; Nogai: Боранбай, Boranbay) is a rural locality (a selo) in Bolshezadoyevsky Selsoviet, Kizlyarsky District, Republic of Dagestan, Russia. The population was 216 as of 2010. There are 2 streets.

== Geography ==
Burumbay is located 28 km northeast of Kizlyar (the district's administrative centre) by road, on the right bank of the Stary Terk River. Novovladimirskoye and Persidskoye are the nearest rural localities.

== Nationalities ==
Nogais, Kumyks and Avars live there.
