= Druzhinin =

Druzhinin is a surname of Russian origin. Notable people with this surname include:

- Alexander Druzhinin (1824–1864), Russian writer, translator, and magazine editor
- Egor Druzhinin (born 1972), Russian actor, director, and choreographer
- Evgeny Druzhinin (born 1968), Russian entrepreneur and public figure
- Fyodor Druzhinin (1932–2007), Russian composer
- Ilya Druzhinin (born 1998), Russian swimmer
- Petr Druzhinin (born 1974), Russian-Israeli historian and author
