= Tsvetkovka =

Tsvetkovka Цветковка
- Selo
- Location within Republic of Dagestan Location within Russia
- Coordinates: 43°56′N 46°50′E
- Country: Russia
- Region: Republic of Dagestan
- District: Kizlyarsky District
- Time zone: UTC+3:00

Tsvetkovka (Russian: Цветковка) is a rural locality (a selo) and the administrative centre of Tsvetkovsky Selsoviet, Kizlyarsky District, Republic of Dagestan, Russia. The population was 3,767 as of 2010. There are 24 streets.

== Geography ==
Tsvetkovka is located 16 km northeast of Kizlyar (the district's administrative centre) by road. Khutseyevka and Dalneye are the nearest rural localities.

== Nationalities ==
Avars, Chechens and Dargins live there.
