= Novokrestyanovskoye =

Novokrestyanovskoye Новокрестьяновское
- Selo
- Location within Republic of Dagestan Location within Russia
- Coordinates: 43°53′N 46°34′E
- Country: Russia
- Region: Republic of Dagestan
- District: Kizlyarsky District
- Time zone: UTC+3:00

Novokrestyanovskoye (Russian: Новокрестьяновское) is a rural locality (a selo) in Novokokhanovsky Selsoviet, Kizlyarsky District, Republic of Dagestan, Russia. The population was 965 as of 2010. There are 3 streets.

== Geography ==
Novokrestyanovskoye is located 17 km northwest of Kizlyar (the district's administrative centre) by road. Novomonastyrskoye and Aleksandro-Nevskoye are the nearest rural localities.

== Nationalities ==
Nogais, Russians, Dargins and Avars live there.
