= History of the Jews in Kizlyar =

Kizlyar Jews
יהודי קיזליאר Кизлярские евреи
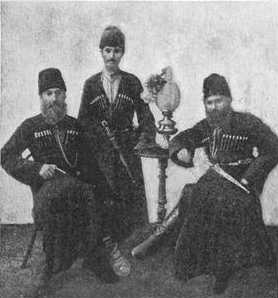

Total population
- 5–10

Languages
- Hebrew (in Israel), Judeo-Tat, Russian

Religion
- Judaism

Related ethnic groups
- Mountain Jews, Ashkenazi Jews.

The Jewish community in Kizlyar, located in the Russian Republic of Dagestan, primarily consisted of Mountain Jews, a distinct Jewish group with their own language and customs, originating from the Caucasus region. Some Ashkenazi Jews also lived in Kizlyar, and they were the ones who mostly went into exile. Jews have lived in Kizlyar since the times of the Russian Empire.

== History ==
=== Russian empire ===
- In 1869, 35 Jews lived in Kizlyar.
- In 1910, 173 Jews lived in Kizlyar, which was 1.6% of the total population.
- At the end of the 19th century, there was one synagogue in Kizlyar.
- In 1901, the first Zionist circle was organized, and there was a cheder.
- Before the October Revolution of 1917–1923, there was a synagogue on Jewish Street (now Frunze Street). The area around the synagogue was called the Jewish Quarter, where mostly Mountain Jews lived. There was no separate synagogue for Ashkenazi Jews; they attended the Mountain Jewish synagogue.
- At the beginning of the 20th century, Rabbi Meir Hanukaevich Rafailov (?-1951) opened a “Mountain Jewish” school in the city of Kizlyar. Along with secular subjects such as mathematics, Russian, and Judeo-Tat, the school also taught Hebrew and included Torah studies.
- In 1913, Jews owned six shops and stores in the city of Kizlyar, including the only jewelry store.

=== Soviet period ===
- During the Russian Civil War (1917–1923), Jewish refugees from neighboring villages arrived in Kizlyar. The land of many Jews was requisitioned.
- During the Soviet period, the Jewish synagogue in the city of Kizlyar was demolished.
- In 1926, 319 Jews lived in Kizlyar, including 62 of Mountain Jews.
- In 1927, a plot of 7,000 dessiatins of land was allocated in the Kizlyarsky District for Mountain Jewish farmers.
- During the Soviet period, schools and reading izbas for Mountain Jews were opened in the Kizlyarsky district.
- Forty-three Jewish families from Kizlyar moved to the allocated land plots.
- In 1930, the Jewish settlements of Larinskoye and Kalinino in the Kizlyarsky District were closed due to their unviability.
- From 1928 to 1931, OZET and KOMZET branches operated in Kizlyar.
- In 1939, 232 Jews lived in Kizlyar.
- In 1959, 330 Jews lived in Kizlyar.
- Until the 1990s, about 2,000 Jews lived in Kizlyar. Approximately 70 percent were Mountain Jews and 30 percent were Ashkenazi. The community rented space in the city's House of Culture, consisting of two rooms: a large one for club meetings and celebrations, and a small one for an office. The Jewish community opened a Family Club that met every week. They regularly gathered there on Shabbat and Jewish holidays.
- In the 1990s, “lawlessness” began in the city of Kizlyar. Racketeers took away houses and businesses from Jews, evicting them from the city. They threatened and forced Jews to leave, and some had Molotov cocktails thrown into their homes.
- During the 1990s, there was a large outflow of Jews due to the Chechen War. Jews left for Israel and other regions of Russia.

=== Russian Federation ===
- On May 6, 2005, the Orthodox Judaism company "Jewish Community of Kizlyar" was registered in Kizlyar.
- In 2007, the Jewish community of the city of Kizlyar numbered 120–140 people.

Since started the Gaza war in October 2023, the work of the Jewish community in Kizlyar has been suspended.

== See also ==
- Judaism in Dagestan
- Judeo-Tat
- Judeo-Tat literature
- Judeo-Tat Theatre
- Mountain Jews
