= Tushilovka =

Tushilovka Тушиловка
- Selo
- Location within Republic of Dagestan Location within Russia
- Coordinates: 44°18′N 46°52′E
- Country: Russia
- Region: Republic of Dagestan
- District: Kizlyarsky District
- Time zone: UTC+3:00

Tushilovka (Russian: Тушиловка) is a rural locality (a selo) in Kizlyarsky District, Republic of Dagestan, Russia. The population was 716 as of 2010. There are 4 streets.

== Geography ==
Tushilovka is located 74 km northeast of Kizlyar (the district's administrative centre) by road. Bryansk and Koktyubey are the nearest rural localities.

== Nationalities ==
Russians, Avars, Dargins and Tabasarans live there.
