= Gruzinskoye =

Gruzinskoye Грузинское
- Selo
- Location within Republic of Dagestan Location within Russia
- Coordinates: 43°58′N 47°00′E
- Country: Russia
- Region: Republic of Dagestan
- District: Kizlyarsky District
- Time zone: UTC+3:00

Gruzinskoye (Russian: Грузинское) is a rural locality (a selo) in Novoserebryakovsky Selsoviet, Kizlyarsky District, Republic of Dagestan, Russia. The population was 193 as of 2010. There are 2 streets.

== Geography ==
Gruzinskoye is located 34 km northeast of Kizlyar (the district's administrative centre) by road. Novaya Serebryakovka and Chernyayevka are the nearest rural localities.

== Nationalities ==
Dargins and Kumyks live there.
