= Selo imeni Zhdanova =

Selo imeni Zhdanova Село имени Жданова
- Selo
- Location within Republic of Dagestan Location within Russia
- Coordinates: 43°51′N 46°41′E
- Country: Russia
- Region: Republic of Dagestan
- District: Kizlyarsky District
- Time zone: UTC+3:00

Selo imeni Zhdanova (Russian: Село имени Жданова) is a rural locality (a selo) and the administrative centre of Krasnoarmeysky Selsoviet, Kizlyarsky District, Republic of Dagestan, Russia. The population was 1,987 as of 2010. There are 28 streets.

== Nationalities ==
Avars, Russians, Rutuls, Laks, Dargins, Lezgins, Kumyks and Armenians live there.

== Geography ==
It is located 3 km west of Kizlyar (the district's administrative centre) by road. Kizlyar and Krasny Voskhod are the nearest rural localities.
