= Khutseyevka =

Khutseyevka Хуцеевка
- Selo
- Location within Republic of Dagestan Location within Russia
- Coordinates: 43°55′N 46°46′E
- Country: Russia
- Region: Republic of Dagestan
- District: Kizlyarsky District
- Time zone: UTC+3:00

Khutseyevka (Russian: Хуцеевка) is a rural locality (a selo) in Yasnopolyansky Selsoviet, Kizlyarsky District, Republic of Dagestan, Russia. The population was 944 as of 2010. There are 6 streets.

== Geography ==
Khutseyevka is located 12 km northeast of Kizlyar (the district's administrative centre) by road. Dalneye and Proletarskoye are the nearest rural localities.

== Nationalities ==
Avars, Russians, Nogais, Dargins, Laks and Chechens live there.
