= Yefimovka, Republic of Dagestan =

Yefimovka Ефимовка
- Selo
- Location within Republic of Dagestan Location within Russia
- Coordinates: 43°50′N 46°47′E
- Country: Russia
- Region: Republic of Dagestan
- District: Kizlyarsky District
- Time zone: UTC+3:00

Yefimovka (Russian: Ефимовка) is a rural locality (a selo) in Averyanovsky Selsoviet, Kizlyarsky District, Republic of Dagestan, Russia. The population was 597 as of 2010. There are 10 streets.

== Geography ==
Yefimovka is located 7 km southeast of Kizlyar (the district's administrative centre) by road. Kardonovka and Bolshezadoyevskoye are the nearest rural localities.

== Nationalities ==
Avars, Dargins, Russians and Laks live there.
