= Selo imeni Karla Marksa =

Selo imeni Karla Marksa Село имени Карла Маркса
- Selo
- Location within Republic of Dagestan Location within Russia
- Coordinates: 43°53′N 46°47′E
- Country: Russia
- Region: Republic of Dagestan
- District: Kizlyarsky District
- Time zone: UTC+3:00

Selo imeni Karla Marksa (Russian: Село имени Карла Маркса) is a rural locality (a selo) in Bolshebredikhinsky Selsoviet, Kizlyarsky District, Republic of Dagestan, Russia. The population was 2,189 as of 2010. There are 13 streets.

== Geography ==
It is located 12 km northeast of Kizlyar (the district's administrative centre) by road, on the left bank of the Stary Terek River. Maloye Kozyrevskoye and Sadovoye are the nearest rural localities.

== Nationalities ==
Dargins, Avars, Russians, Laks, Rutuls and Lezgins live there.
