= Novovladimirskoye =

Novovladimirskoye Нововладимирское Гоьрбуьв
- Selo
- Location within Republic of Dagestan Location within Russia
- Coordinates: 43°54′N 46°57′E
- Country: Russia
- Region: Republic of Dagestan
- District: Kizlyarsky District
- Time zone: UTC+3:00

Novovladimirskoye (Russian: Нововладимирское; Nogai: Гоьрбуьв, Görbüv) is a rural locality (a selo) in Chernyayevsky Selsoviet, Kizlyarsky District, Republic of Dagestan, Russia. The population was 774 as of 2010. There are 6 streets.

== Geography ==
Novovladimirskoye is located 25 km northeast of Kizlyar (the district's administrative centre) by road. Burumbay, Persidskoye and Chernyayevka are the nearest rural localities.

== Nationalities ==
Nogais, Kumyks, Avars, Azerbaijanis, Dargins and Russians live there.
