= Pervokizlyarskoye =

Pervokizlyarskoye Первокизлярское
- Selo
- Location within Republic of Dagestan Location within Russia
- Coordinates: 43°53′N 46°40′E
- Country: Russia
- Region: Republic of Dagestan
- District: Kizlyarsky District
- Time zone: UTC+3:00

Pervokizlyarskoye (Russian: Первокизлярское) is a rural locality (a selo) in Kosyakinsky Selsoviet, Kizlyarsky District, Republic of Dagestan, Russia. The population was 438 as of 2010. There are 3 streets.

== Geography ==
Pervokizlyarskoye is located 5 km northwest of Kizlyar (the district's administrative centre) by road. Kosyakino and Imeni Shaumyana are the nearest rural localities.

== Nationalities ==
Avars and Laks live there.
