= Kizlyar Brandy Factory =

Russian spirits producer

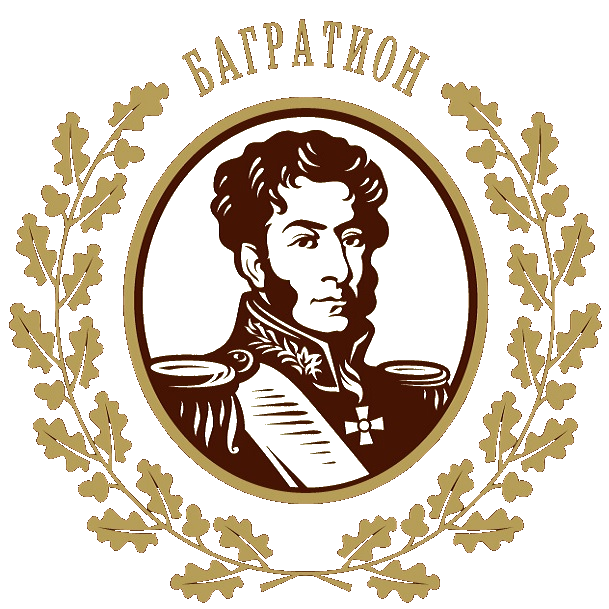

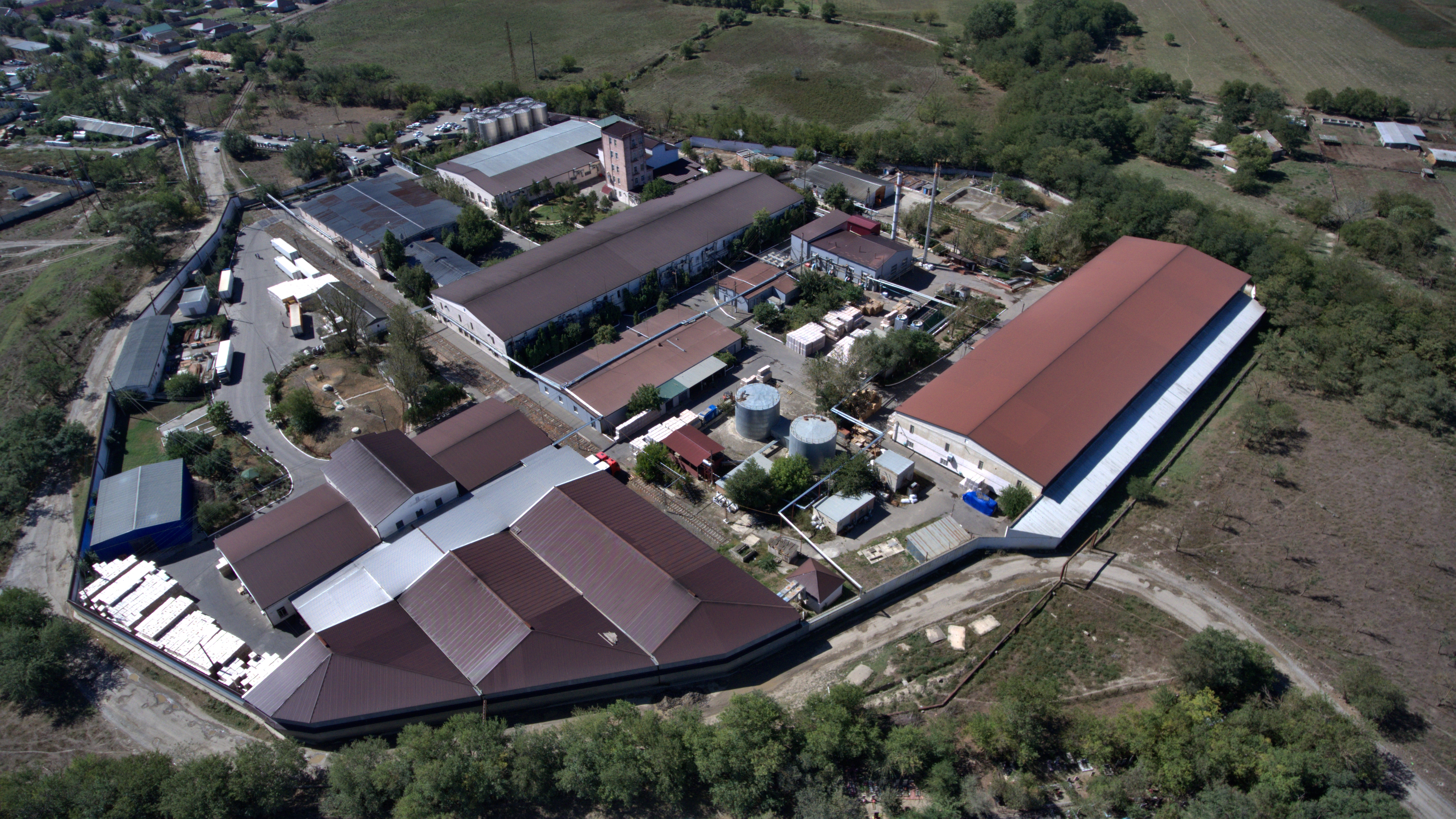
- Type: Joint-stock company
- Founded: 1885; 141 years ago (Note: The Kizlyar Brandy Factory considers 1885 to be its founding year, corresponding to the first Kizlyar product shipment. A founding year of 1889 has also been suggested, which corresponds to the organization of cognac production at Kizlyar.)
- Founder: David Sarajishvili
- Headquarters: Kizlyar, Dagestan, Russia
- Key people: Evgeny Druzhinin (Director general)
- Products: Alcoholic drink
- Revenue: 2,4 billion rubles (2013)
- Net income: 268,447,000 Russian ruble (2018)
- Total assets: 5,750,292,000 Russian ruble (2018)
- Number of employees: 341 (2015)
- Parent: Federal Agency for State Property Management
- Website: kizlyar-cognac.ru

Kizlyar Brandy Factory is a Russian producer of alcoholic beverages, located in Kizlyar, Dagestan. It is one of the five largest Russian brandy producers.

== History ==
=== Russian Empire ===
Viticulture and winemaking have been the main sectors of the economy of Kizlyar since the second half of the 18th century. A 1884, "On fruit and wine production", encouraged industrial production of brandy in Kizlyar.

In the 1880s, Georgian businessman David Sarajishvili began producing alcohol Kizlyar; he was the first in the Russian Empire to produce cognac by keeping grape alcohol in Caucasian mountain oak barrels. Kizlyar first shipment - 236 buckets of grape alcohol to Moscow - in 1885. It was not until 1889 that Sarajishvili organized cognac production at Kizlyar. 1885 is regarded as the start of industrial cognac production in Russia.

Production at the factory dropped following the prohibition of alcohol at outbreak of the First World War in 1914.

=== Soviet Union ===
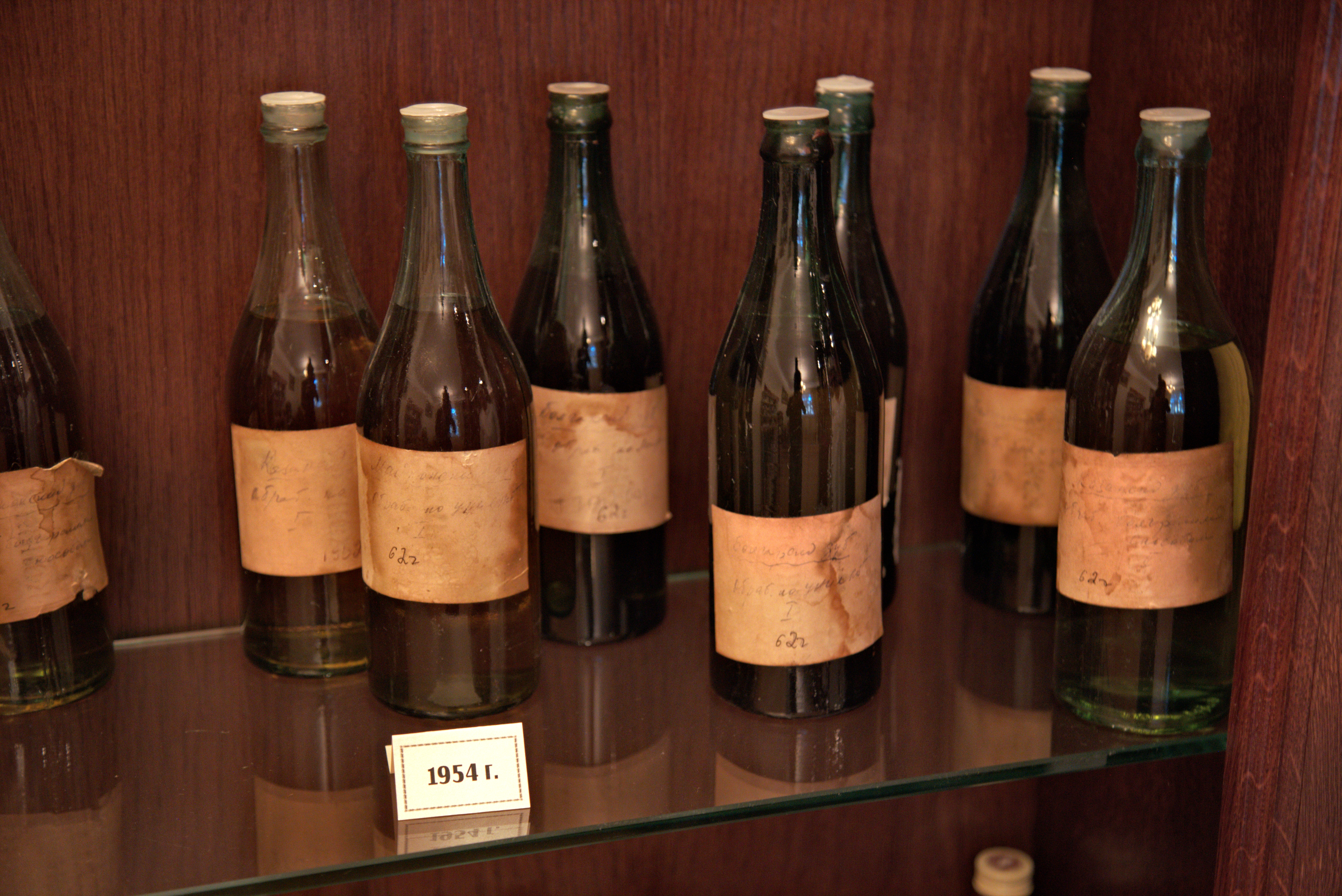
Cognac made in 1954

Cognac production was reauthorized by the Soviet government in 1924, with full production only being restored just before the entry of the Soviet Union into the Second World War. In 1942, the factory was evacuated to Armenia to avoid the German advance; most of the alcohol was sent to the Tbilisi Cognac Factory.

The factory relocated to Kizlyar in 1947. Restoration continued into the mid-1950s, with a new batch of cognac being produced in 1955 from 6-7 year old alcohol. Reconstruction and expansion of plant and employee accommodation to meet rising demand continued to 1960.

In Soviet times, about half of the strong alcohol produced at the factory was exported, mainly to Western European countries.

The factory produced grape juice instead of alcohol during the period of prohibition starting in 1985. The factory also required new suppliers due to the closure of Kizlyar and Tarumovsky district vineyards starting in 1985.

=== Russian Federation ===
The work of one of the production departments of the plant

In 1990, the factory became a rental company "Dagvino". Due to the shortage of raw materials the company began to buy grapes in Spain or, in harvest years, in Krasnodar and Stavropol regions. In 1998, the factory received a French certificate that permitted to sell its products under the name "cognac", although earlier Kizlyar factory exported its drinks as a brandy.

In 1998, during the Chechen–Russian conflict, Vladimir Grigoriants, the director of the factory, and his wife were kidnapped and had been held in Chechen captivity for eight months.

In 2008, Evgeny Druzhinin became the director of the factory. During his leadership, the company carried out modernization at its own expense and increased production volumes, becoming the main source of the Dagestan budget. Also in 2008, the factory restored the status of the Kremlin Suppliers Guild

On August 28, 2014, by order of the Prime Minister of Russia Dmitry Medvedev, the Kizlyar Brandy Factory was transferred to federal ownership and became a subject of Federal Service for Alcohol Market Regulation.

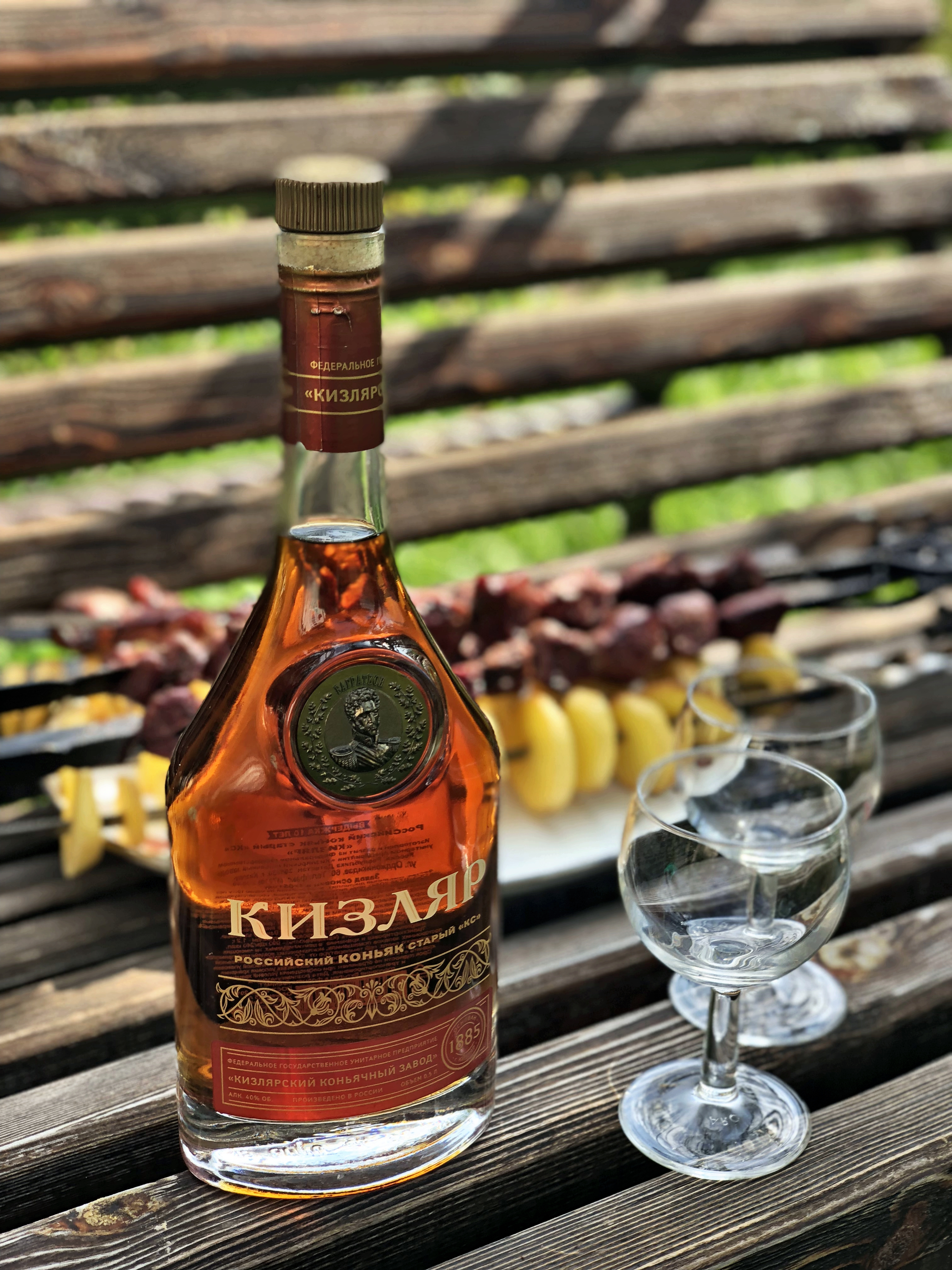
Factory products

In the summer of 2015, the management of the factory initiated the creation of the Union of Cognac Producers, which included the Moscow Wine and Brandy Factory KiN and the Wine and Brandy Factory Alliance 1892.

On September 1, 2015, the company was transformed into a joint-stock company.

== Capacity rate ==
In 2008-2009, the factory management invested 15 million rubles in expanding the area of its own vineyards. During the financial crisis in 2009, the factory temporarily lost the status of the main enterprise of the region, giving way to the Derbent sparkling wine factory. At the end of 2012, the net profit of the factory amounted to about 1.5 billion rubles, and the factory itself got into the group of the three most profitable companies in the North Caucasus.

At the end of 2015, the factory became the second largest enterprise in Dagestan with a total revenue of 2.4 billion rubles.

At the end of 2018, the factory processed over 40 thousand tons of grapes.

At the end of 2020, despite the COVID-19 pandemic, the company sold over 533 thousand decaliters of bottled products (more than 13 million bottles) with a plan of 530 thousand decaliters.

In October 2021, the plant began exporting its products to Germany for the first time. The first batch of exported products included cognacs "Dagestan" and "Russia".

== Production ==
The factory produces cognacs of various aging times and grape vodka. In the 2010s, its brands included "Peter the Great", "Five Stars", "Three Stars", "Kizlyarsky Festive", "Russia", "Bagration", "Dagestan", "Kizlyar", "Lezginka", "Imperator Vserossijsky" and "Saradzhev". The company also produces grape vodka "Kizlyarka", which recipe was restored in 1976.

The factory's products have won more than 40 Grand Prix, the Golden Palm Prize (France), the Golden Galaxy Award (USA), and more than 400 gold and silver medals.
