= Vperyod, Republic of Dagestan =

Vperyod Вперёд
- Selo
- Location within Republic of Dagestan Location within Russia
- Coordinates: 43°53′N 46°42′E
- Country: Russia
- Region: Republic of Dagestan
- District: Kizlyarsky District
- Time zone: UTC+3:00

Vperyod (Russian: Вперёд) is a rural locality (a selo) and the administrative centre of Vperedovsky Selsoviet, Kizlyarsky District, Republic of Dagestan, Russia. The population was 1,554 as of 2010. There are 17 streets in this locality.

== Geography ==
Vperyod is located 8 km north of Kizlyar (the district's administrative centre) by road. Zarya Kommuny and Kosyakino are the nearest rural localities.

== Nationalities ==
Avars and Russians live there.
