= Yevgeny Epov =

Evgeny Yurevich Epov
- Native name: Евгений Юрьевич Эпов
- Born: 4 October 1988 Chernyshevsky District, Zabaykalsky Krai
- Died: 27 January 2012 (aged 23) Kizlyarsky District, Dagestan
- Allegiance: Russia
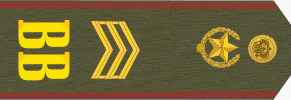
- Rank: Sergeant
- Awards: Hero of the Russian Federation

Evgeny Yurevich Epov (Russian: Евгений Юрьевич Эпов; 4 October 1988 — 27 January 2012) was a sergeant of the MVD Spetsnaz who was posthumously awarded the title Hero of the Russian Federation.

On 27 January 2012 Epov was killed in battle in Kizlyarsky District, Dagestan. During the battle, a militant threw a grenade that landed near his unit. He jumped onto it, shielding other soldiers from injury. Three other soldiers died in the battle.

Epov was posthumously awarded with the Hero of the Russian Federation medal by a presidential decree on 28 April 2012. The medal was presented to Epov's family on 20 July 2012.

He was buried on February 3, 2012, at the cemetery of the village of Milgidun in Chernyshevsky District, Zabaykalsky Krai, where his mother, Valentina Ivanovna Kozhukhovskaya, resides.

On October 4, 2012, a monument to Yevgeny Epov was unveiled near the school in his native village of Milgidun.

== See also ==
- List of Heroes of the Russian Federation
