= Bolshaya Areshevka =

Bolshaya Areshevka Большая Арешевка
- Selo
- Location within Republic of Dagestan Location within Russia
- Coordinates: 44°06′N 46°55′E
- Country: Russia
- Region: Republic of Dagestan
- District: Kizlyarsky District
- Time zone: UTC+3:00

Bolshaya Areshevka (Russian: Большая Арешевка) is a rural locality (a selo) and the administrative centre of Bolsheareshevsky Selsoviet, Kizlyarsky District, Republic of Dagestan, Russia. The population was 1,565 as of 2010. There are 12 streets.

== Geography ==
Bolshaya Areshevka is located 34 km northeast of Kizlyar (the district's administrative centre) by road. Makarovskoye and Novye Bukhty are the nearest rural localities.

== Nationalities ==
Avars, Dargins, Russians, Tabasarans, Kumyks, Lezgins, Tsakhurs and Laks live there.
