= Malaya Areshevka =

Malaya Areshevka Малая Арешевка
- Selo
- Location within Republic of Dagestan Location within Russia
- Coordinates: 44°01′N 46°49′E
- Country: Russia
- Region: Republic of Dagestan
- District: Kizlyarsky District
- Time zone: UTC+3:00

Malaya Areshevka (Russian: Малая Арешевка) is a rural locality (a selo) and the administrative centre of Maloareshevsky Selsoviet, Kizlyarsky District, Republic of Dagestan, Russia. The population was 1,668 as of 2010. There are 8 streets.

== Geography ==
Malaya Areshevka is located 23 km northeast of Kizlyar (the district's administrative centre) by road. Kerlikent and Serebryakovka are the nearest rural localities.

== Nationalities ==
Avars, Dargins and Russians live there.
