= Brandy =

Spirit produced by distilling wine

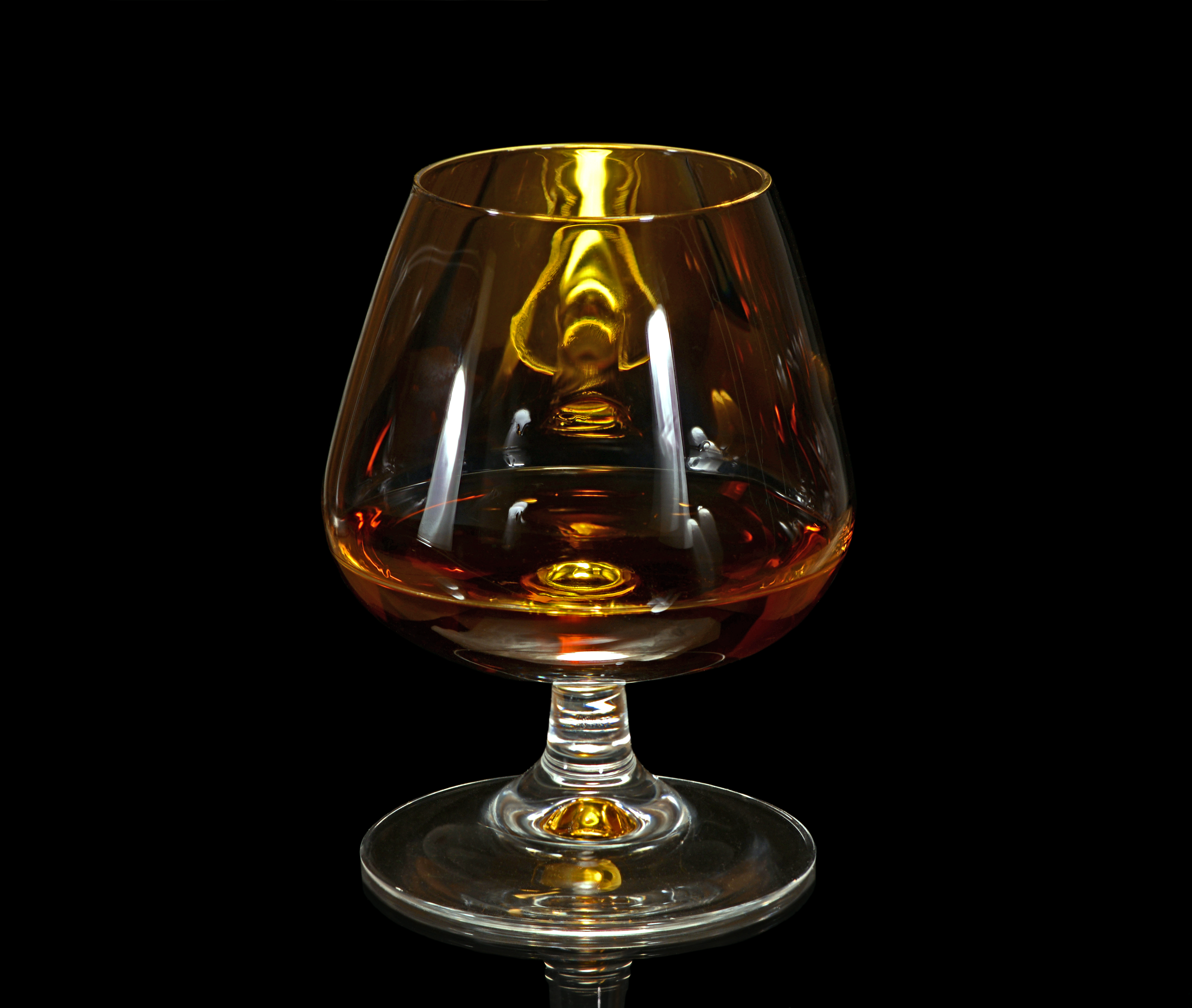
- Cognac brandy in a typical snifter
- Type: Distilled beverage
- Origin: France
- Introduced: 15th century
- Alcohol by volume: 35–60%
- Proof (US): 70°–120°
- Ingredients: wine
- Variants: pomace brandy, fruit brandy
- Related products: Armagnac, Cognac

Brandy is a liquor produced by distilling wine. Brandy generally contains 35–60% alcohol by volume (70–120 US proof) and is typically consumed as an after-dinner digestif. Some brandies are aged in wooden casks. Others are coloured with caramel colouring to imitate the effect of ageing, and some are produced using a combination of ageing and colouring. Varieties of wine brandy can be found across the winemaking world. Among the most renowned are Cognac and Armagnac from southwestern France.

In a broader sense, the term brandy also denotes liquors obtained from the distillation of pomace (yielding pomace brandy), or mash or wine of any other fruit (fruit brandy). These products are also called eau de vie (literally "water of life" in French).

== History ==
The origins of brandy are tied to the development of distillation. While the process was known in classical times, it was not significantly used for beverage production until the 15th century. In the early 16th-century French brandy helped kickstart the cross-Atlantic triangle trade when it took over the central role of the Portuguese fortified wine due to its higher alcohol content and ease of shipping. Canoemen and guards on the African side of the trade were generally paid in brandy. By the late 17th century, the cheaper rum had replaced brandy as the exchange alcohol of choice in the triangle trade.

Initially, wine was distilled as a preservation method and to make it easier for merchants to transport. It is also thought that wine was originally distilled to lessen the tax, which was assessed by volume. The intent was to add the water removed by distillation back to the brandy shortly before consumption. It was discovered that after being stored in wooden casks, the resulting product improved over the original distilled spirit. In addition to removing water, the distillation process led to the formation and decomposition of numerous aromatic compounds, fundamentally altering the distillate composition from its source. Non-volatile substances such as pigments, sugars, and salts remained behind in the still. As a result, the distillate taste was often quite unlike the sources.

As described in the 1728 edition of Cyclopaedia, the following method was used to distill brandy:

A cucurbit was filled half full of the liquor from which brandy was to be drawn and then raised with a little fire until about one-sixth part was distilled, or until that which falls into the receiver was entirely flammable. This liquor, distilled only once, was called the spirit of wine or brandy. Purified by another distillation (or several more), this was called spirit of wine rectified. The second distillation was made in [a] balneo mariae and in a glass cucurbit, and the liquor was distilled to about one-half the quantity. This was further rectified as long as the operator thought it necessary to produce brandy.

To shorten these several distillations, which were long and troublesome, a chemical instrument was invented that reduced them to a single distillation. A portion was ignited to test the purity of the rectified spirit of wine. The liquor was good if a fire consumed the entire contents without leaving any impurities behind. Another, better test involved putting a little gunpowder in the bottom of the spirit. The liquor was good if the gunpowder could ignite after the spirit was consumed by fire. (Hence the modern "proof" to describe alcohol content.)

As most brandies have been distilled from grapes, the regions of the world producing excellent brandies have roughly paralleled those areas producing grapes for viniculture. At the end of the 19th century, the western European markets, including by extension their overseas empires, were dominated by French and Spanish brandies and eastern Europe was dominated by brandies from the Black Sea region, including Bulgaria, the Crimea, Georgia and Armenia. In 1877, the Ararat brandy brand was established in Yerevan, Armenia. It became one of the top brandy brands over time and during the Yalta Conference, Winston Churchill was so impressed with the Armenian brandy Dvin given to him by Joseph Stalin that he asked for several cases of it to be sent to him each year. Reportedly 400 bottles of Dvin were shipped to Churchill annually. In 1884, David Sarajishvili founded a brandy factory in Tbilisi, Georgia, a crossroads for Turkish, Central Asian, and Persian trade routes and a part of the Russian Empire at the time.

== Technology ==
Except for a few major producers, brandy production and consumption tend to have a regional character, and thus production methods significantly vary. Wine brandy is produced from a variety of grape cultivars. A special selection of cultivars, providing distinct aroma and character, is used for high-quality brandies, while cheaper ones are made from whichever wine is available.

Brandy is made from so-called base wine, which significantly differs from regular table wines. It is made from early grapes to achieve higher acid concentration and lower sugar levels. Base wine generally contains smaller amounts (up to 20 mg/L) of sulphur than regular wines, as it creates undesired copper(II) sulfate in reaction with copper in the pot stills. The yeast sediment produced during the fermentation may or may not be kept in the wine, depending on the brandy style.

Brandy is distilled from the base wine in two phases. First, a large part of water and solids is removed from the base, obtaining so-called "low wine", a concentrated wine with 28–30% ABV. In the second stage, low wine is distilled into brandy. The liquid exits the pot still in three phases, referred to as the "heads", "heart", and "tails", respectively. The first part, the "head", has an alcohol concentration of about 83% (166 US proof) and an unpleasant odour. The weak portion on the end, the "tail", is discarded along with the head, and they are generally mixed with another batch of low wine, thereby entering the distillation cycle again. The middle heart fraction, the richest in aromas and flavours, is preserved for later maturation.

Distillation does not simply enhance the alcohol content of wine. The heat under which the product is distilled and the material of the still (usually copper) cause chemical reactions during distillation. This leads to the formation of numerous new volatile aroma components, changes in relative amounts of aroma components in the wine, and the hydrolysis of components such as esters.

Brandy is usually produced in pot stills (batch distillation) but, for continuous distillation, the column still can also be used. The distillate obtained in this manner has a higher alcohol concentration (approximately 90% ABV) and is less aromatic. The choice of the apparatus depends on the style of brandy produced. Cognac and South African brandy are examples of brandy produced in batches, while many American brandies use fractional distillation from column stills.

== Chemistry ==
=== Chemical compounds in brandy ===
Some of the key compounds found in brandy include:

Ethanol (C_{2}H_{5}OH): The primary alcohol responsible for intoxication.

Esters: Such as ethyl acetate, contributing to fruity flavors.

Aldehydes: Like acetaldehyde, adding to the aroma.

Tannins: From the wood, providing astringency.

=== Aging ===
After distillation, the unaged brandy is placed into oak barrels to mature. Usually, brandies with a natural golden or brown colour are aged in oak casks (single-barrel ageing). Some brandies, particularly those from Spain, are aged using the solera system, where the producer changes the barrel each year. After a period of ageing, which depends on the style, class and legal requirements, the mature brandy is mixed with distilled water to reduce alcohol concentration and bottled. Some brandies have caramel colour and sugar added to simulate the appearance of barrel ageing.

== Consumption ==
=== Serving ===
Brandy is traditionally served at room temperature (neat) from a snifter, a wine glass or a tulip glass. When drunk at room temperature, it is often slightly warmed by holding the glass cupped in the palm or by gentle heating. Excessive heating of brandy may cause the alcohol vapour to become too strong, causing its aroma to become overpowering. Brandy-drinkers who like their brandy warmed may ask for the glass to be heated before the brandy is poured.

Brandy may be added to other beverages to make several popular cocktails; these include the Brandy Sour, the Brandy Alexander, the Sidecar, the Brandy Daisy, and the Brandy Old Fashioned.

Anglo-Indian usage has "brandy-pawnee" (brandy with water).

=== Culinary uses ===
Brandy is a common deglazing liquid used in making pan sauces for steak and other meat. It creates a more intense flavour in some soups, notably onion soup.

In English Christmas cooking, brandy is a common flavouring in traditional foods such as Christmas cake, brandy butter, and Christmas pudding. It is also commonly used in drinks, such as mulled wine and eggnog, drunk during the festive season.

Brandy is used to flambé dishes such as crêpe Suzette and cherries jubilee while serving. Brandy is traditionally poured over a Christmas pudding and set alight before serving. The use of flambé can retain as much as 75% of the alcohol in the brandy.

=== Historical medical uses ===
In the 19th century, brandy was often used as medical treatment due to its alleged "stimulating" qualities. It was also used by many European explorers of tropical Africa, who suggested that regular, moderate doses of brandy might help a traveller to cope with fever, depression, and stress. These views fell out of favour in the late nineteenth and early twentieth century, with suggestions that people were using brandy's "medical" qualities as an excuse for social drinking.

== Terminology and legal definitions ==
The term brandy is a shortening of the archaic English brandewine or brandywine, which was derived from the Dutch word brandewijn, itself derived from gebrande wijn, which literally means "burned wine" and whose cognates include brännvin and brennivín. In Germany, the term Branntwein refers to any distilled spirits, while Weinbrand refers specifically to distilled wine from grapes.

In the general colloquial usage of the term, brandy may also be made from pomace and from fermented fruit other than grapes. If a beverage comes from a particular fruit (or multiple fruits) other than exclusively grapes, or from the must of such fruit, it may be referred to as a "fruit brandy" or "fruit spirit" or named using the specific fruit, such as "peach brandy", rather than just generically as "brandy". If pomace is the raw material, the beverage may be called "pomace brandy", "marc brandy", "grape marc", "fruit marc spirit", or "grape marc spirit", "marc" being the pulp residue after the juice has been pressed from the fruit.

Grape pomace brandy may be designated as "grappa" or "grappa brandy". Apple brandy may be referred to as "applejack", although the process of jacking which was originally used in its production involved no distillation. There is also a product called "grain brandy" that is made from grain spirits.

Within particular jurisdictions, specific regulatory requirements regarding the labelling of products identified as brandy exist. For example:

- In the European Union, there are regulations that require products labelled as brandy, except "grain brandy", to be produced exclusively from the distillation or redistillation of grape-based wine or grape-based "wine fortified for distillation" and aged a minimum of six months in oak.
- In the US, a brandy that has been produced from other than grape wine must be labelled with a clarifying description of the type of brandy production, such as "peach brandy", "fruit brandy", "dried fruit brandy", or "pomace brandy", and brandy that has not been aged in oak for at least two years must be labelled as "immature".
- In Canada, the regulations regarding naming conventions for brandy are similar to those of the US (provisions B.02.050–061). According to Canadian food and drug regulations, Brandy shall be a potable alcoholic distillate, or a mixture of potable alcoholic distillates, obtained by the distillation of wine. The minimum specified ageing period is six months in wood, although not necessarily oak (provision B.02.061.2). Caramel, fruit, other botanical substances, flavourings, and flavouring preparations may also be included in a product called brandy (provisions B.02.050–059).

Within the European Union, the German term Weinbrand is legally equivalent to the English term "brandy", but outside the German-speaking countries it is particularly used to designate brandy from Austria and Germany.

== Varieties and brands ==
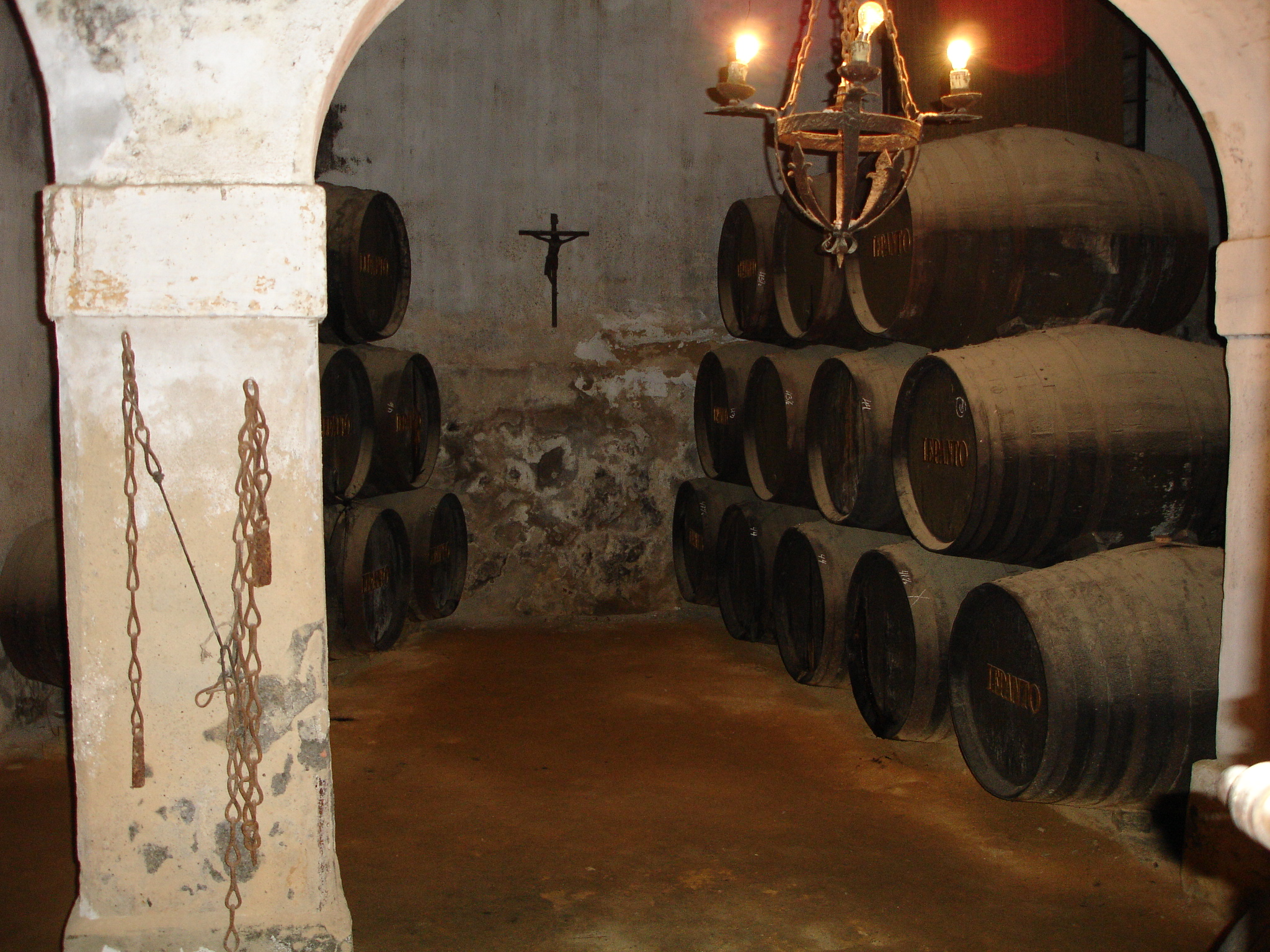
Brandy de Jerez in barrels aging

- Most American grape brandy production is situated in California. Popular brands include Christian Brothers, E&J Gallo, Korbel, and Paul Masson.
- Ararat has been produced since 1877 and comes from the Ararat plain in the southern part of Armenia. Bottles on the market are aged anywhere from 3 to 20 years.
- In France:
  - Armagnac is made from grapes of the Armagnac region in the southwest of France, Gers, Landes and Lot-et-Garonne. It is single-continuous distilled in a copper still and aged in oak casks from Gascony or Limousin or from the renowned Tronçais Forest in Auvergne. Armagnac was the first distilled spirit in France. Its usage was first mentioned in 1310 by Vital Du Four in a book of medicine recipes. Armagnacs have a specificity: they offer vintage qualities. Popular brands are Darroze, Baron de Sigognac, Larressingle, Delord, Laubade, Gélas and Janneau.
  - Cognac comes from the Cognac region of France, and is double distilled using pot stills. Popular brands include Hine, Martell, Camus, Otard, Rémy Martin, Hennessy, Frapin, Delamain and Courvoisier. The European Union and some other countries legally enforce "Cognac" as the exclusive name for brandy produced and distilled in the Cognac area of France and the name "Armagnac" for brandy from the Gascony area of France. Both must also be made using traditional techniques. Since these are considered "protected designations of origin", a brandy made elsewhere may not be called Cognac in these jurisdictions, even if it was made in an identical manner.
  - Fine is any high-quality brandy, including Cognac and Armagnac but also Fine de Bordeaux, Fine de Bourgogne, and Fine de la Marne.
- Cyprus brandy differs from other varieties in that its alcohol concentration is only 32% ABV (64 US proof).
- Greek brandy is distilled from Muscat wine. Mature distillates are made from sun-dried Savatiano, Sultana, and Black Corinth grape varieties blended with an aged Muscat wine.
- Brandy de Jerez originates from vineyards around Jerez de la Frontera in Andalusia, Spain. It is used in some sherries and is also available as a separate product. It has a protected designation of origin (PDO).
- Kanyak (or konyak) is a variety from Turkey, whose name is both a variation of "cognac" and means "burn blood" in Turkish, a reference to its use in cold weather.
- Portuguese Lourinhã region, just north of Lisbon, is one of the few European PDO that produce only brandy (aguardente vínica), together with Cognac, Armagnac and Jerez.
- In Moldova and Romania, grape brandy is colloquially called coniac but is officially named Divin in Moldova and Vinars in Romania. After a double distillation, the beverage is usually aged in oak barrels and labelled according to its age (VS is a minimum of 3 years old, VSOP is a minimum of 5 years old, XO is a minimum of 7 years old, and XXO is a minimum of 20 years old).
- In Russia, brandy was first produced in 1885 at the Kizlyar Brandy Factory according to a recipe brought from France. Kizlyar brandy is produced according to the classic cognac technology and is one of the most popular beverages in Russia. Also in 2008, the factory restored the status of the Kremlin Suppliers Guild.
- South African brandies are, by law, made almost exactly as Cognac, using a double distillation process in copper pot stills followed by ageing in oak barrels for a minimum of three years. Because of this, South African brandies are considered very high quality.
- Italian brandy has been produced since the 1700s in the North of Italy, especially in Emilia-Romagna and Veneto, using grapes that are popular in winemaking such as Sangiovese and Grignolino. Colour, texture and finish resemble those of their French and Spanish counterparts. The most popular brands are Vecchia Romagna, Stravecchio Branca, and Stock 84. Northern Italy has also been noted since the Middle Ages for its pomace brandy, grappa, which is generally colourless but has some top-shelf varieties called barrique which are aged in oak casks and achieve the same caramel colour as regular brandies. There is a vast production of brandies and grappas in Italy, with more than 600 large, medium or small distilleries. Ticino, in Italian-speaking Switzerland, is also allowed to produce pomace brandy designated as grappa.

== Labelling of grades ==
Brandy has a traditional age grading system, although its use is unregulated outside of Cognac and Armagnac. These indicators can usually be found on the label near the brand name:

- V.S. ("very special") or ✯✯✯ (three stars) designates a blend in which the youngest brandy has been stored for at least two years in a cask.
- V.S.O.P. ("very superior old pale"), Reserve or ✯✯✯✯✯ (five stars) designates a blend in which the youngest brandy is stored for at least four years in a cask.
- X.O. (Extra Old) The minimum age of the youngest brandy used in an X.O. blend was increased to 10 years in April 2018; this rule was originally scheduled for implementation in 2016 but was postponed due to inadequate stocks. The Napoleon designation, previously unofficial, is used to specifically denote those blends with a minimum age of six years that do not meet the revised X.O. definition.
- Hors d'âge ('beyond age') is a designation formally equal to XO for Cognac, but for Armagnac it designates brandy that is at least ten years old. In practice, the term is used by producers to market a high-quality product beyond the official age scale.

In the case of Brandy de Jerez, the Consejo Regulador de la Denominacion Brandy de Jerez classifies it according to:

- Brandy de Jerez Solera: 6 months old.
- Brandy de Jerez Solera Reserva: one year old.
- Brandy de Jerez Solera Gran Reserva: three years old.

Russian brandy (traditionally called "Cognac" within the country), as well as brandies from many other post-Soviet states, uses the traditional Russian grading system, which is similar to the French one, but extends it significantly:

- "Three stars" or ✯✯✯ designates the brandy with the youngest component cask-aged for at least two years, analogous to the French V.S.
- "Four stars" or ✯✯✯✯ is for the blends where the youngest brandy is aged for at least three years.
- "Five stars" means that the youngest brandy in the blend was aged four years, similar to the French V.S.O.P.
- КВ/KV ("Aged Cognac") is a designation corresponding to "XO" or "Napoléon", meaning that the youngest spirit in the blend is at least six years old.
- КВВК/KVVK ("Aged Cognac, Superior Quality") designates the eight-year-old blends and tends to be used only for the highest quality vintages.
- КС/KS ("Old Cognac"): At least ten years of age for the youngest spirit in the blend (similar to the Armagnac's "Hors d'âge").
- ОС/OS ("Very Old"): Beyond the French system, designating blends older than 20 years.

== See also ==
- Cut brandy – Liquor made of brandy, neutral grain spirit and water
- Dutch brandy – Liquor
- Fortified wine – Wine with an added distilled beverage
