= Evgeny Druzhinin =

Russian entrepreneur and public figure

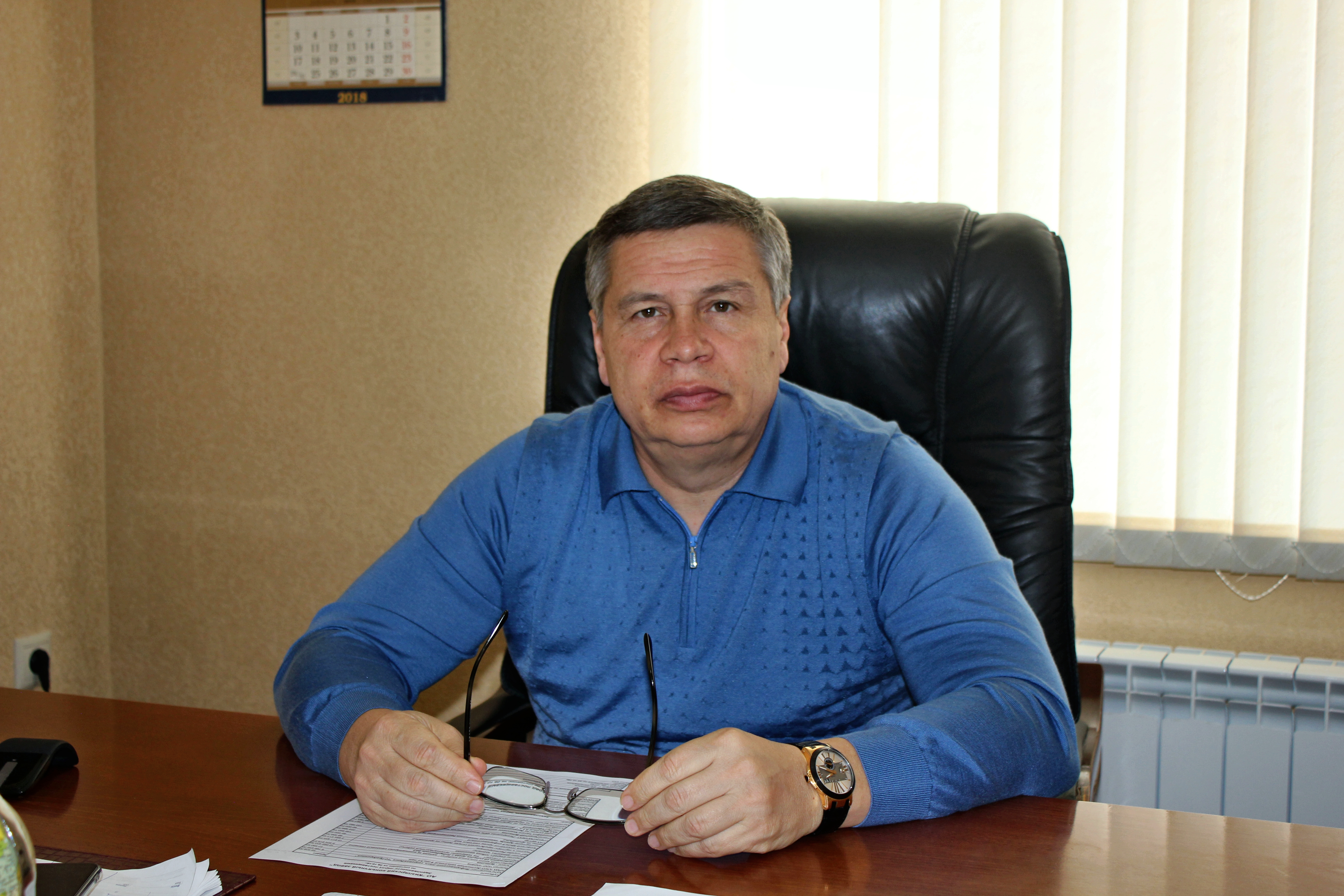
- Born: Evgeny Anatolyevich Druzhinin; October 29, 1968 (age 57); Kizlyar, Dagestan, USSR
- Education: Russian Presidential Academy of National Economy and Public Administration
- Occupations: Entrepreneur, winemaker, philanthropist
- Children: 3
- Website: Kizlyar Brandy Factory

Evgeny Anatolyevich Druzhinin (Russian: Евгений Анатольевич Дружинин; born October 29, 1968) — Russian entrepreneur and public figure. General manager of Kizlyar Brandy Factory, one of the largest Russian brandy (cognac) producers and the second largest enterprise in Dagestan. The factory is included in the list of backbone organizations of Dagestan.

== Biography ==
Born October 29, 1968, in the Dagestan city of Kizlyar in a family of hereditary winemakers. Mother - Lyudmila Ivanovna Druzhinina (born in 1950), Head of the blending department of the Kizlyar Brandy Factory. Evgeny grew up in Kizlyar, where in 1986 he graduated from high school number 7. For two years (1987–1989), he served in the strategic missile forces at the Baikonur cosmodrome in the city of Leninsk. In 1992 he graduated from the economics department of the Moscow Cooperative Institute.

Then, he was offered the position of a winemaker at one of the Derbent factories, where Druzhinin worked for three years. In 1997 he returned to the capital of Russia, where he became deputy director of the Moscow branch of the Kizlyar Brandy Factory and worked in that capacity until 2000. After the closure of the branch, Druzhinin went into private entrepreneurship, from 2000 to 2006, he was the general director of Elida LLC, a major Russian alcohol distributor.

In 2005 he graduated from the Russian Academy of National Economy and Public Administration under the President of the Russian Federation.

In May 2008, Druzhinin became the deputy director of the Kizlyar Brandy Factory for commercial matters. After Vladimir Grigoriants departed from the management of the factory, he was headed by Evgeny Druzhinin. During his leadership, the company carried out modernization at its own expense and increased production volumes, becoming the main donor of the Dagestan budget. On his initiative, in July 2008, the plant again became a member of the Kremlin Suppliers Guild.

In 2012, Druzhinin was elected a deputy of the Kizlyar city district of the VI convocation from the United Russia party. He was a member of the commission for industry, transport, communications, trade, consumer services and consumer protection.

In the summer of 2015, Druzhinin initiated the creation of the Union of Cognac Producers, which included the Moscow Wine and Brandy Factory KiN and the Wine and Brandy Factory Alliance 1892.

== Family and personal life ==
Married Raises a daughter and two sons. Druzhinin takes an active part in the life of the Makhachkala diocese.

== Awards ==
- Order of the Holy Equal-to-the-Apostles Grand Duke Vladimir (2016)
- Breastplate "For the development of social partnership" of the Trade Union of workers of the AIC of the Russian Federation (2010)
- Medal and Diploma "For High Quality" of the Ministry of Agriculture of the Russian Federation (2002)
- Diploma of the Republic of Dagestan for conscientious work (2010)
- Certificate of Merit of the city of Kizlyar (2013)
- Certificate of Honor of the Government of the Republic of Dagestan (2014)
- Certificate of Honor of the Federal Agency for State Property Management (2015)
- Certificate of Honor of the Federal Service for Alcohol Market Regulation (2017)
