= Kosyakino =

Kosyakino Косякино
- Selo
- Location within Republic of Dagestan Location within Russia
- Coordinates: 43°54′N 46°40′E
- Country: Russia
- Region: Republic of Dagestan
- District: Kizlyarsky District
- Time zone: UTC+3:00

Kosyakino (Russian: Косякино) is a rural locality (a selo) and the administrative centre of Kosyakinsky Selsoviet, Kizlyarsky District, Republic of Dagestan, Russia. The population was 1,445 as of 2010. There are 14 streets in this rural locality.

== Geography ==
Kosyakino is located 8 km northwest of Kizlyar (the district's administrative centre) by road. Vperyod and Pervomayskoye are the nearest rural localities.

== Nationalities ==
Avars, Dargins, Russians, Laks, Kumyks, Azerbaijanis and Lezgins live there.
