= Kizlyarka =

Kizlyarka is a grape vodka named after the Russian city of Kizlyar, where much of the drink is produced. Kizlyarka's alcohol content is 40-45%.

== Production process ==
Alcohol is aged in barrels for up to one and a half years by distillation of grape must, acquiring a yellow tint over time. Sugar syrup and water are then added, the amount of the latter added determining the alcohol content of the Kizlyarka. Generally, there are three types of Kizlyarka. "Original" is not aged and has an alcohol content of 40%; "traditional" is aged for 7 months and has an alcohol content of 40%; and "aged" is aged for 18 months and has an alcohol content of 45%.

== History ==
Originally brought to Russia from France, it is believed that grape vodka began being produced in the Russian city of Kizlyar in 1657 as a replacement for the low quality wines that were being produced there at the time. Since 1731, fruit vodka made in Russia is referred to as Kizlyar vodka or Kizlyarka. During the 1800s, one barrel of Kizlyarka was made from ten barrels of crushed, juiced grapes.

According to P. N. Surovikin, the director of the wine and cognac factory, Kizlyarka grew in popularity in the 1810s due to an increased production of grape alcohol, a ban on foreign wines, and the French invasion of Russia in 1812. Another explanation for its rise in popularity during this time period could be its cheapness at the time compared to similar foreign alcohol.

New Russian taxation laws in 1816 taxed Kizlyarka and bread grape vodka equally, causing the production of Kizlyarka to no longer be profitable. In 1820, Emperor Alexander I issued the “Regulations on Vodka Produced from Russian Grape Wines and Grapes in the Astrakhan and Caucasus Provinces”, which implied strict regulations on the mixture of bread vodka and other vodkas. Kizlyarka production in Kizlyar decreased from 235 thousand buckets in 1828 to 120 thousand buckets in 1932. By the 1840s, there was a further decrease in the production of Kizlyarka due to an increase of the price of alcohol.

In 1893, at the World's Columbian Exposition in Chicago, Kizlyarka was awarded a bronze medal and an honorary diploma.

In 1976, Kizlyar Brandy Factory in Kizlyar began mass-producing Kizlyarka.

== See also ==
- List of vodkas

== Sources ==
- Л. В. Беловинский (2007). "Кизлярка". In Н. Ерёминой (ed.). Иллюстрированный энциклопедический историко-бытовой словарь русского народа. XVIII — начало XIX в. (5 000 экз ed.). М.: Эксмо. p. 279. ISBN 978-5-699-24458-4.
- Д. Ю. Пучков (2017). Самогон. СПб.: Питер. p. 159. ISBN 978-5-4461-0490-1.
