= David Sarajishvili =

Georgian philanthropist

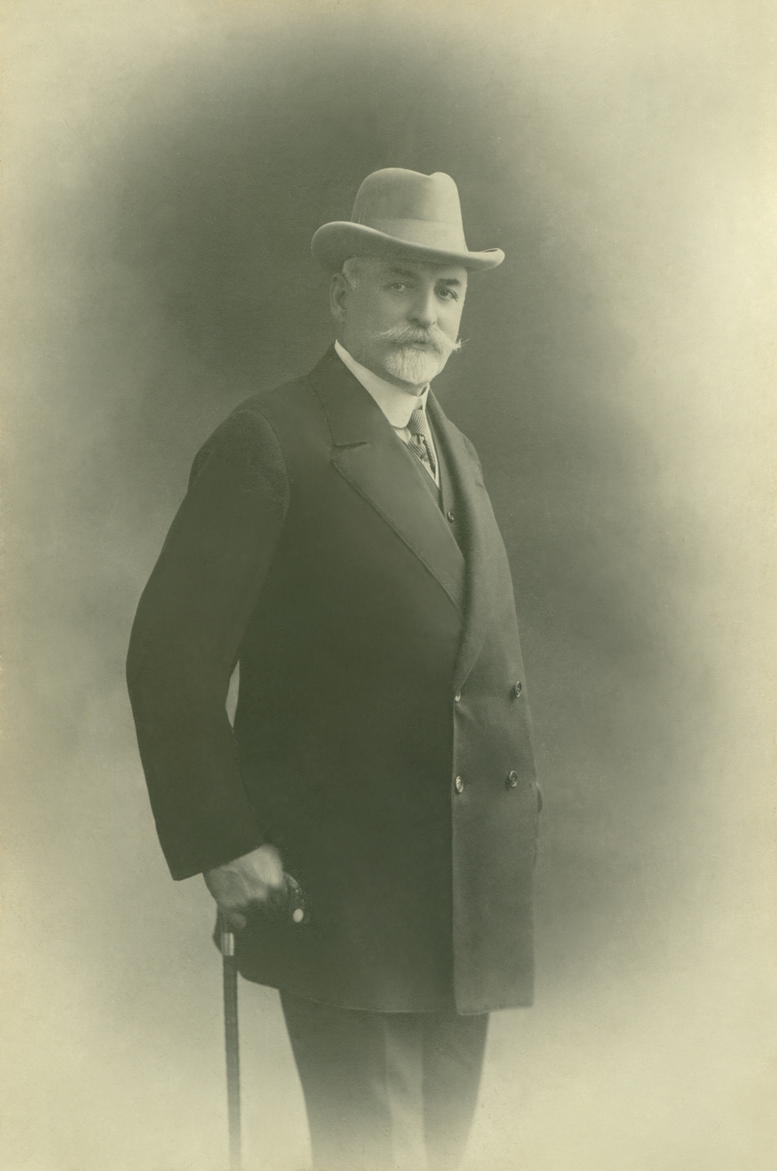
- Born: David Zakharyevich Sarajishvili; 28 October 1848; Tiflis, Georgia
- Died: 20 June 1911 (aged 62); Tiflis, Georgia
- Occupations: Entrepreneur, philanthropist, winemaker

David Zacharias dze Sarajishvili (Georgian: დავით ზაქარიას ძე სარაჯიშვილი; (born October 28, 1848, Tiflis, Russian Empire-June 20, 1911, Tiflis, Russian Empire) was a Georgian scientist, entrepreneur and philanthropist. Founder of several brandy plants in the Russian Empire, including the Tbilisi and Kizlyar Brandy Factory.

== Biography ==
Sarajishvili was born on October 28, 1848, in Tiflis. Father - merchant Zakhari Davidovich Sarajishvili (1810-1880). Mother - Elizabeth Savaneli. Sisters - Catherine and Maria. Their parents lived in a house on Sergievskaya Street (now - Machabeli), where David spent his childhood.

In 1866, he graduated with honors from the First Classical Gymnasium of Tiflis. After that, he entered the Faculty of Natural History of St. Petersburg University, but a year later he continued his studies in Germany at the University of Heidelberg. He graduated from the university in 1871, receiving a doctorate in chemical and philosophical sciences.

After university, he studied agriculture in the German cities of Hoffenheim and Halle. From 1878 to 1879 he studied winemaking in France, where he met winegrower Jean Baptiste Camus, who shared his secret knowledge with Sarajishvili. In 1880, Sarajishvili returned to Tiflis and settled in the house of his parents in Sergievskaya. In May 1880, his father died and left a legacy of 700 thousand rubles. In the fall of 1880, Sarajishvili married Ekaterina Ivanovna Porakishvili. They did not have children. In 1884-85, Sarajishvili laid the foundation for the construction of the future Tbilisi Cognac Factory, which opened in 1888. In 1885, Sarajishvili, together with his father-in-law Ivan Porakishvili, created the Kizlyar Brandy Factory. Also in 1885 in Tiflis on Olginskaya Street (now - Merab Kostavy Street), Sarajishvili built a distillation plant for the distillation of fruit and grape vodka. In 1887, he opened a distillery in Tiflis. In 1894 he opened a factory in Yerevan, in 1895 in Kalaras, and in 1896 in Baku. He also owned a vodka distillery in Vladikavkaz.

Sarajishvili was the first to start producing cognac at his enterprises in the Russian Empire by keeping the grape spirit in barrels of Caucasian mountain oak. The enterprises of Sarajishvili occupied an almost monopoly position in the Russian Empire. The total production in 1890 was almost 218 thousand bottles, and in 1910 it was 600 thousand bottles. In 1902, Sarajishvili destroyed his parents' house on Sergievskaya Street and temporarily moved to the house number 3 on Freylenskaya Street (now Sulkhan-Saba Orbeliani Street). The architect of the new building project, the construction of which was completed in 1905, was the German architect Karl Zaar. For achievements in the production of alcoholic beverages, Sarajishvili received the title of "Advisor for Commerce", and in 1913 his company received the title of "Supplier of His Imperial Majesty's Court".

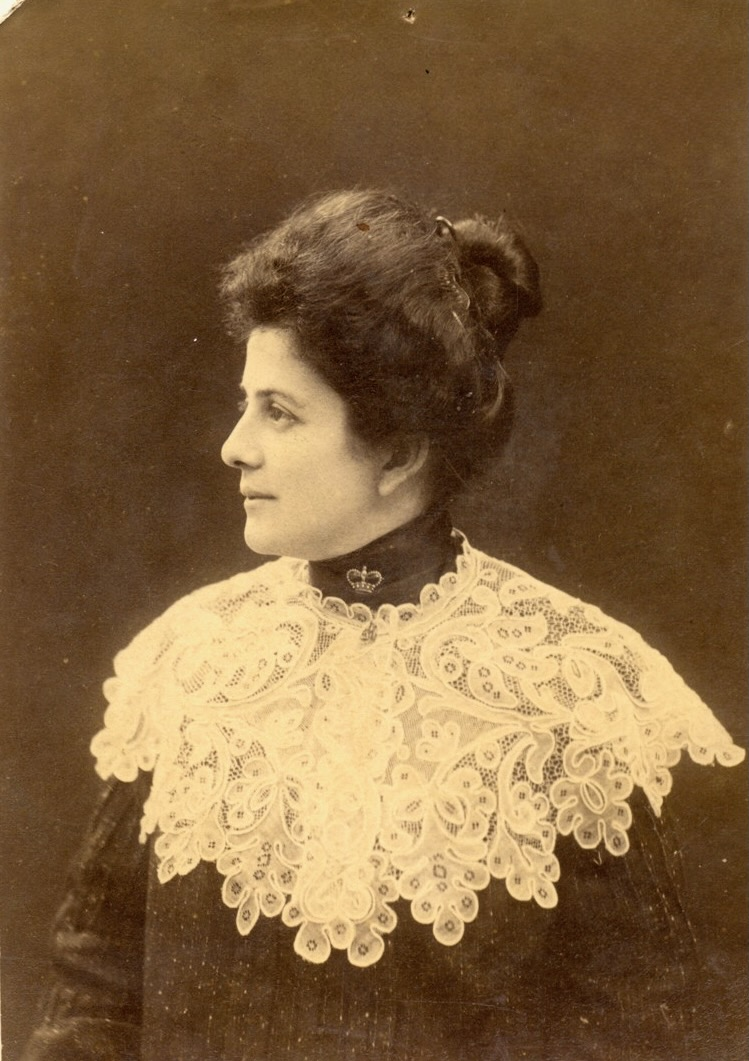
Ekaterine Porakishvili-Sarajishvili, philanthropist and wife of David Sarajishvili

In later years, Sarajishvili was seriously ill - he was diagnosed with cancer. He issued his deathbed testament notarized in Rostov-on-Don. He died on June 20, 1911. The funeral commission was supervised by Valerian Gunia. The requiem prayer took place in the temple of Sioni. One of those who spoke at the funeral procession was the poet Akaki Tsereteli. Sarajishvili's body was buried in the Didube Pantheon. In 1938, the dust of the couple was moved to a new location in Vake. By the initiative of the founder and president of the Sarajishvili joint-stock company, Guji Bubuteishvili, in 1995, the remains of David Sarajishvili and Ekaterina Porakishvili were reburied near the Kashveti church.

== Charity ==
Sarajishvili was engaged in charity, supported many famous Georgian artists and musicians. Sarajishvili was the initiator of the creation of a committee chaired by Niko Tskhvedadze, who was engaged in financing talented young people and granted scholarships for education in Russia and abroad. Among the Sarajishvili scholarship holders were the composers Zakhary Paliashvili, Dimitri Arakishvili, Meliton Balanchivadze, Kote Potskhverashvili, Ia Kargareteli; artists Gigo Gabashvili, Moses Toidze, Grigol Meskhi; sculptor Iakob Nikoladze; singers Vano Sarajishvili, Valerian Kashakashvili; scientist Filippo Gogichashvili; future Georgian patriarch Callistrat. Sponsored archaeological excavations led by Ekvtime Takaishvili. Sarajishvili was also the patron of the construction of the building of the noble school (now - Tbilisi State University).

He assisted Georgian social democrats, in particular in 1910, according to the police department, allocated a monthly stipend of 150 rubles to Noe Zhordania policy.

== Memory ==
- In 2002, at the initiative and at the expense of Sarajishvili JSC, a five-meter bronze monument was erected to David Sarajishvili in the Rike Park.
- In 2005, in the year of the 120th anniversary of the Kizlyar Brandy Factory, a monument to the founder of the company, David Sarajishvili, was erected on its territory.
- In 2012, David Sarajishvili's manor in the village of Bakurtsikhe of the Gurdjaan district received the status of cultural heritage.
- In 2015, in honor of David Sarajishvili, the Kizlyar Brandy Factory, to its 130th anniversary, produced the Sarajev collection of cognac brand.
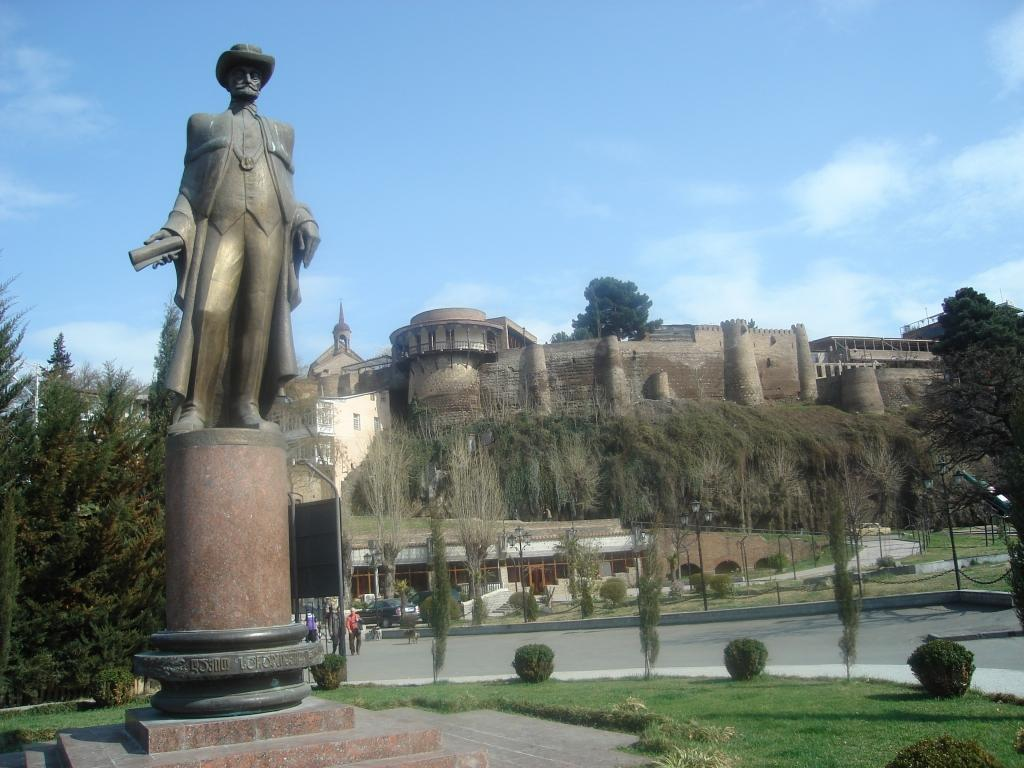
Monument in Rike Park (2006)

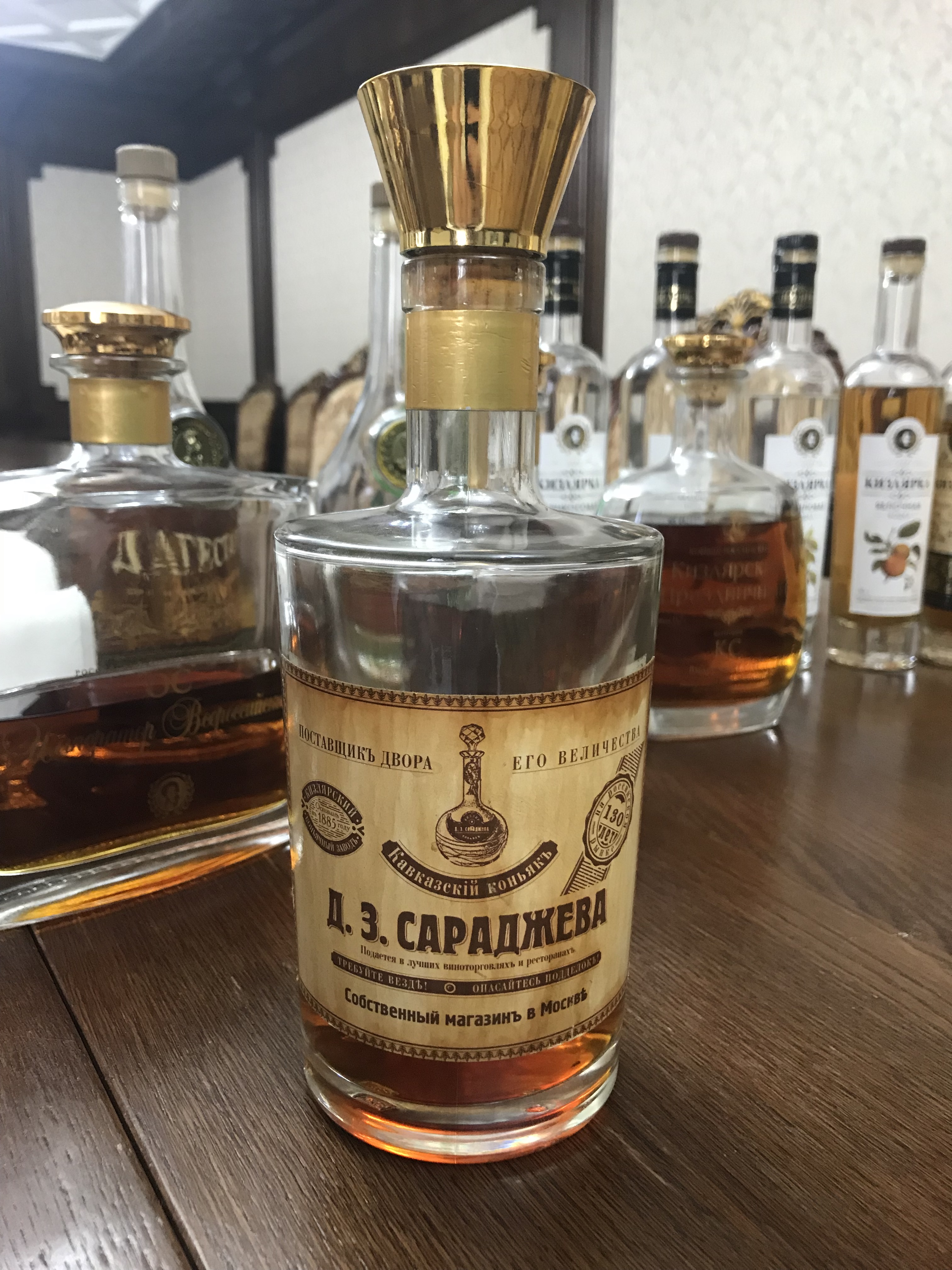
Cognac "Sarajev" (2018)

== Links ==
- Homepage der Firma Sarajishvili mit Angaben zur Biografie Saradschischwilis
- Biografie Saradschischwilis(in German)
