= Komsomolsky, Republic of Dagestan =

Komsomolsky Комсомольский
- Urban-type settlement
- Interactive map of Komsomolsky
- Location of Komsomolsky Komsomolsky (Republic of Dagestan)
- Coordinates: 43°59′N 46°42′E
- Country: Russia
- Federal subject: Dagestan
- Urban-type settlement status since: 1962

Population (2010 Census)
  - Total: 2,723
  - Estimate (2025): 2,489 (−8.6%)

Administrative status
  - Subordinated to: Town of Kizlyar

Municipal status
  - Urban okrug: Kizlyar Urban Okrug
- Time zone: UTC+3 (MSK)
- Postal code: 368802
- OKTMO ID: 82730000056

Komsomolsky population
- 2010 Census: 2,723
- 2002 Census: 2,567
- 1989 Census: 2,358
- 1979 Census: 2,215

Komsomolsky (Russian: Комсомо́льский) is an urban locality (an urban-type settlement) under the administrative jurisdiction of the Town of Kizlyar in the Republic of Dagestan, Russia. As of the 2010 Census, its population was 2,723.

== History ==
Urban-type settlement status was granted to Komsomolsky in 1962.

== Administrative and municipal status ==
Within the framework of administrative divisions, the urban-type settlement of Komsomolsky is in jurisdiction of the Town of Kizlyar. Within the framework of municipal divisions, Komsomolsky is a part of Kizlyar Urban Okrug.
