= Sarajishvili =

JSC Sarajishvili
- Company type: Joint Stock Company
- Industry: Manufacturing and distillation of liquors
- Founded: 1884; 142 years ago in Tbilisi, Georgia
- Founder: David Sarajishvili
- Headquarters: Tbilisi, Georgia
- Area served: Georgia, Europe, Asia
- Key people: Elguja Bubuteishvili (CEO); David Abzianidze (CTO)
- Products: Cognac, Distilled liquor
- Revenue: ▲₾28.6 million (2017)
- Net income: ▲₾3 million (2017)
- Total assets: ▲₾62.2 million (2017)
- Total equity: ▲₾40.6 million (2017)
- Owner: Bubuteishvili family
- Number of employees: 101-200
- Subsidiaries: SIA Sarajishvili Europe; Distribution Company Sarajishvili
- Website: www.sarajishvili.com

JSC Sarajishvili (Georgian: სს „სარაჯიშვილი“) is one of the oldest manufacturers of brandy in Georgia. It was founded in 1884 by a Georgian aristocrat David Sarajishvili. After nationalization of the company by the communist party, the name was changed to the Tbilisi Cognac Factory. In 1994, the company was privatized.

The company mainly specializes in production of high-quality brandy, cognac and vodka, exporting the produce to countries all over the world.

In 2019, JSC Sarajishvili was Georgia's forth-largest winery by revenue, with an income of 45,174,622 GEL.
