= Petr Druzhinin =

Russian historian and author

Dr. Petr Druzhinin
- Петр Алекса́ндрович Дружи́нин
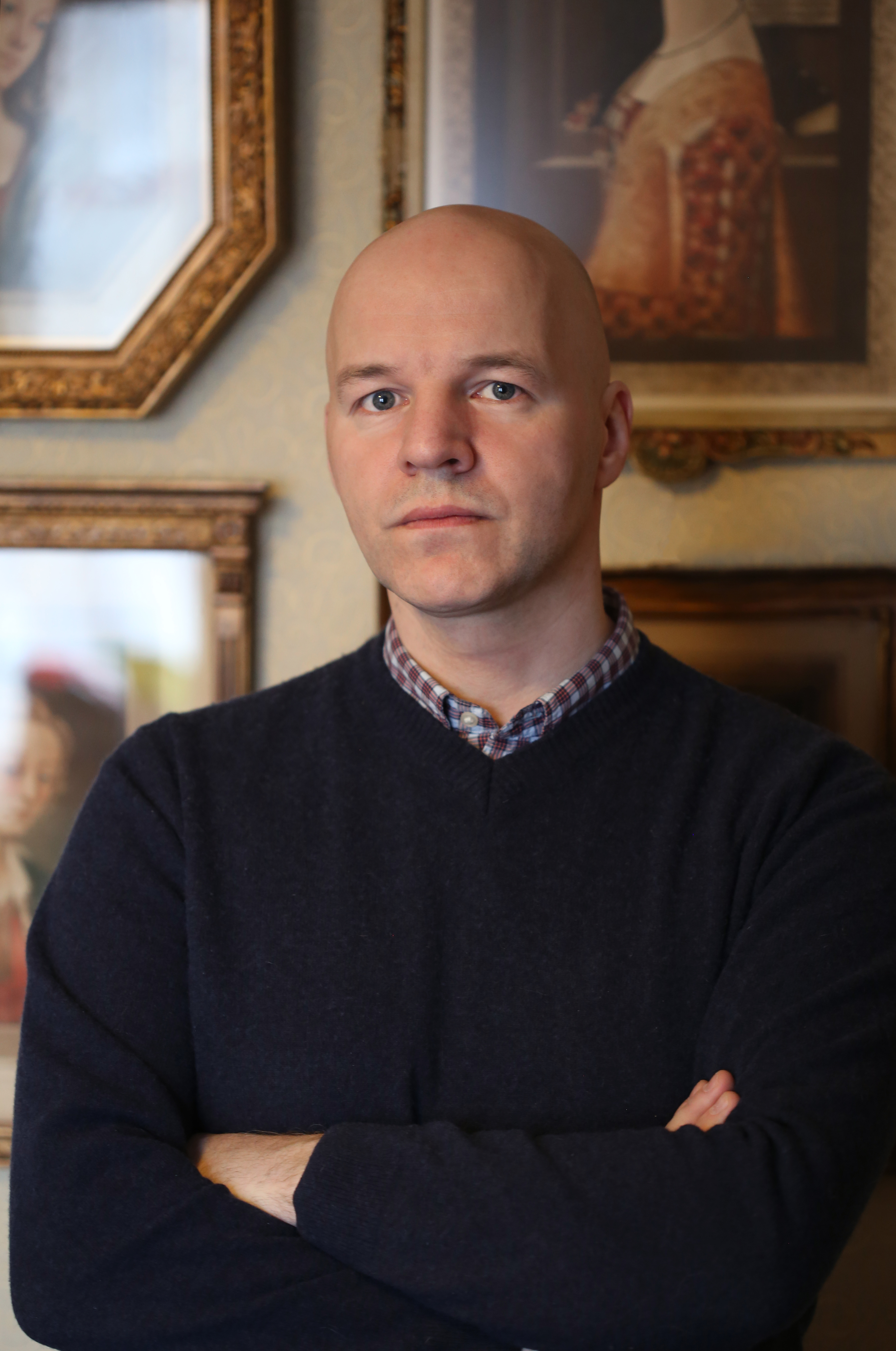
- Druzhinin in 2018
- Education: PhD
- Scientific career
- Fields: History, History of Humanities, Rare book studies

Petr A. Druzhinin (Russian: Петр Алекса́ндрович Дружи́нин) is a Russian–Israeli historian and author. He is a research fellow of the Tel Aviv University and Russian Language Institute of the Russian Academy of Sciences, has published over two dozen books.

== Early life and education ==
In 1996, he graduated from Stroganov Moscow State Academy of Arts and Industry with a degree in history of arts. In 2002, he graduated from the Moscow Technological University. He earned his PhD in history in 2009 from Russian State University for the Humanities.

== Awards ==
In 2014, Druzhinin was awarded the Efim Etkind Prize For outstanding contribution to scientific, cultural and literary relations between Russia and the West for his book Ideology and Philology volumes 1–2.

In 2016, he was received the Udo Ivask Medal and Certificate of Honour from the International Federation of Ex-Libris Societies For outstanding contribution to the study of bookplates for a series of monographs in Book's History Studies.

== Selected works ==
- Books of the Frederick the Great (Livres de Frédéric le Grand ou description d'une collection d'ouvrages, écrits par le roi de Prusse et parus de son vivant, faite à partir des exemplaires appartenant jadis au roi lui-même et à ses héritiers qui se trouvent aujourd'hui dans la Bibliothèque d'État de Russie). Moscow, 2004.
- Ideology and Philology. Leningrad, 1940s. Documentary Research. Vol. 1-2. Moscow, 2012, Vol. 2016.
- The First Publication of Mendeleev’s Periodic System of Elements: A New Chronology. In Historical Studies in the Natural Sciences (2020) 50 (1-2).
- Pyotr Druzhinin's and Alexander Sobolev's Rare Book Collection: A Catalogue Vol. 1–3, 2021.
- The Soviet Suppression of Academia: The Case of Konstantin Azadovsky (Bloomsbury Academic), 2022. Transl. by Sarah Vitali
- Art of the Silhouette in Russia in 18th century. Moscow, 2023
- ABC for Antique Book collectors. Moscow, 2023.
