= Delord =

Delord is a surname. Notable people with the name include:

- Françoise Delord (1940–2021), French ornithologist and zoo owner
- Jacqueline Delord (born 1970), French swimmer

== See also ==
- Kent-Delord House, historic home in Plattsburgh, New York.
