= Camus Cognac =

French brand of cognac

Camus La Grande Marque
- Industry: Production, commercialisation and distribution of wine and spirits
- Founded: 1863
- Founder: Jean-Baptiste Camus
- Successor: Cyril Camus
- Headquarters: Cognac, France
- Number of employees: 500
- Subsidiaries: Shanghai Yuanliu; CIL US
- Website: www.camus.fr

Camus Cognac is a brand of cognac that has been produced by five generations of the Camus family, since 1863 when Jean-Baptiste Camus organized a group of producers to sell cognac under the brand 'La Grande Marque'.

Today, Cyril Camus—the fifth generation of the Camus family—heads the company which counts 500 employees in eight countries on three continents. Camus products are sold in most countries in the world, in almost every international airport and on board a large number of airlines.

== Five generations ==
=== Jean-Baptiste Camus ===
Jean-Baptiste Camus (1835–1901) started as an independent winegrower, distilling and selling his cognac to established cognac houses. In 1863 he decided to organize a consortium of producers to guarantee a consistent level of quality in terms of production and supplies of mature stocks of cognac, and founded ‘La Grande Marque’ as the brand under which to sell them. England was the first export market for La Grande Marque. To establish the principle that the Camus family must have total control of the process from the grape to the glass, Jean-Baptiste bought his partners’ shares and created "Camus La Grande Marque".

=== Edmond and Gaston Camus ===
Jean-Baptiste's elder son, Edmond (1859–1933), entered the company in 1894 as Master Blender, helping his father with all aspects of production. Under his direction, Camus gained further recognition for the quality of its cognacs, and was among the first cognac houses to sell cognac in labelled bottles instead of barrels, helping to establish the brand name. He also developed sales on the French market.

Edmond's younger brother, Gaston (1865–1945), joined the company in 1896 and devoted himself to export sales. He developed a business in Russia, where Camus became the official cognac of the Court of the last Tsar.

=== Michel Camus ===
Michel Camus (1911–1985) was only 21 when he joined the firm in 1932. He continued to build Camus' relationship with Russia, winning an exclusive spirits export and import contract between France and Russia in 1959.

In the early 1960s he started doing business with American group DFS Galleria. He introduced a variety of gift presentations targeted at travellers, including items such as Limoges porcelain and Baccarat crystal decanters, and first promoted the superior Napoléon quality in a signature frosted bottle.

=== Jean-Paul Camus ===
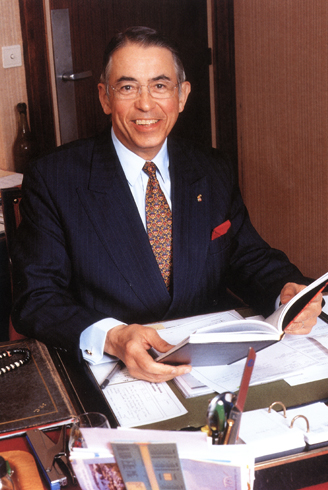
Jean-Paul Camus

Born in 1945 and joining the company to help his father as Master Blender in 1977, Jean-Paul Camus bought new vineyards, distilleries and storage capacity, focussing mainly around the traditional family base in the Borderies growing area.

He also pursued his father's commercial policy in duty-free, developing sales in airports and airlines in the Asia-Pacific region. Camus Napoleon was the best selling cognac of the 1980s, with annual profits of over $100 million thanks to the exclusive worldwide sales rights with Chuck Feeney through DFS Galleria. This became the most popular cognac in Japan.

=== Cyril Camus ===
Cyril Camus, born in 1971, completed a business degree at Babson College in the US before joining CAMUS as the company's Trade Relations Director in Beijing, China in 1994. He returned to Cognac in 1998 as marketing director, overseeing the creation of numerous new products for the duty-free market. He also developed the company's signature Borderies XO, a Borderies blend from the family's own vineyards, and a new cognac from Île de Ré. After becoming president in 2004, Cyril developed the Camus Elegance range.

== Timeline ==
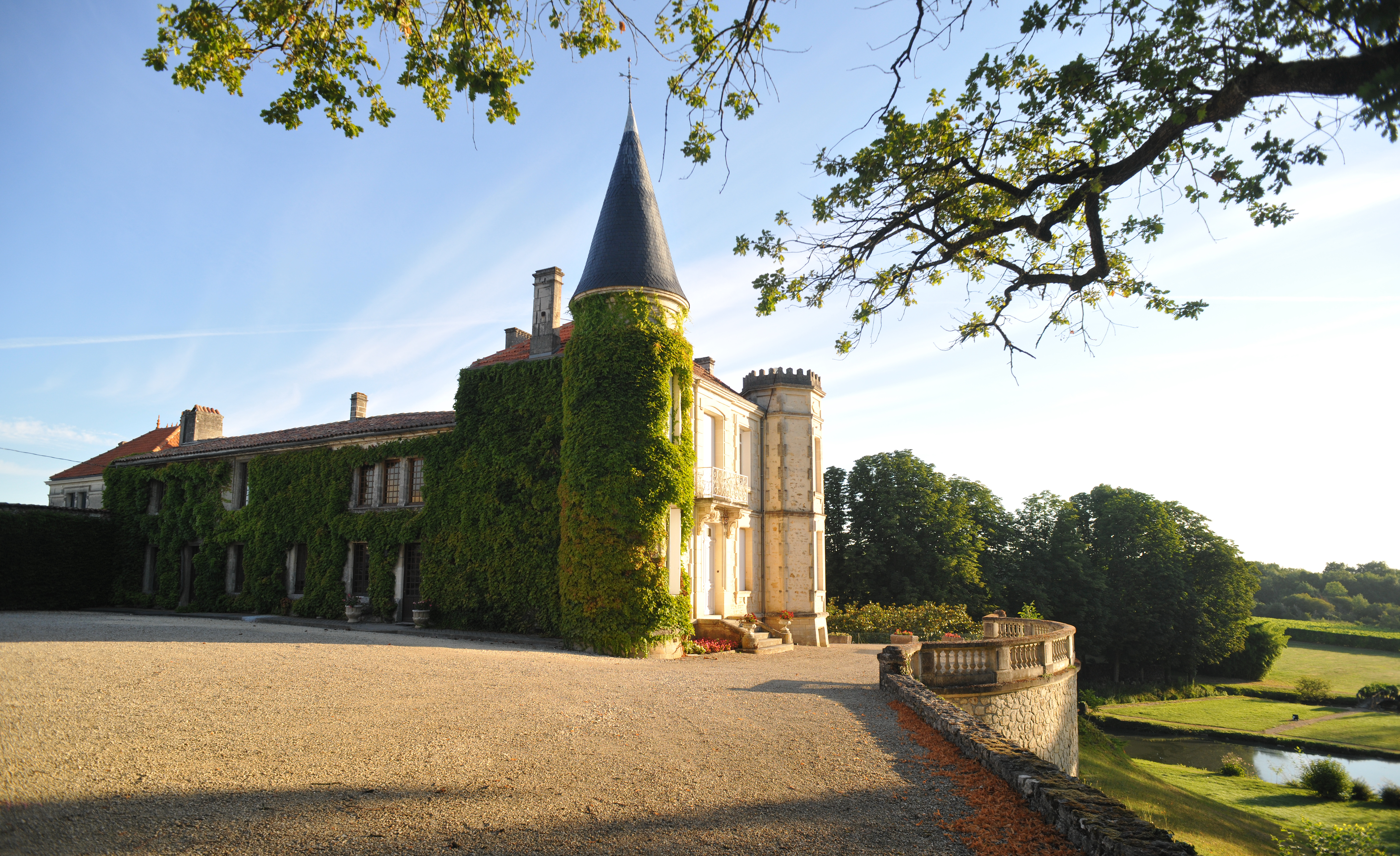
Chateau Plessis the birthplace of the Camus family

- 1863 – Founding of the Company
- 1910 – Became the official cognac at the court of the Tsar of Russia
- 1960 – Entered the duty-free market
- 1971 – Opening the first office in Hong-Kong
- 1991 – Expansion of the vineyards in the Borderies region
- 2000 – First release of Camus Borderies XO, the company's flagship product
- 2007 – Founding of Yuanliu, the company's China subsidiary
- 2008 – Activation of CIL US, the company's USA subsidiary. Opening of the Camus Vietnam Office
- 2009 – Opening of the first Maison Camus store, and first Maison Camus Lounge in Beijing

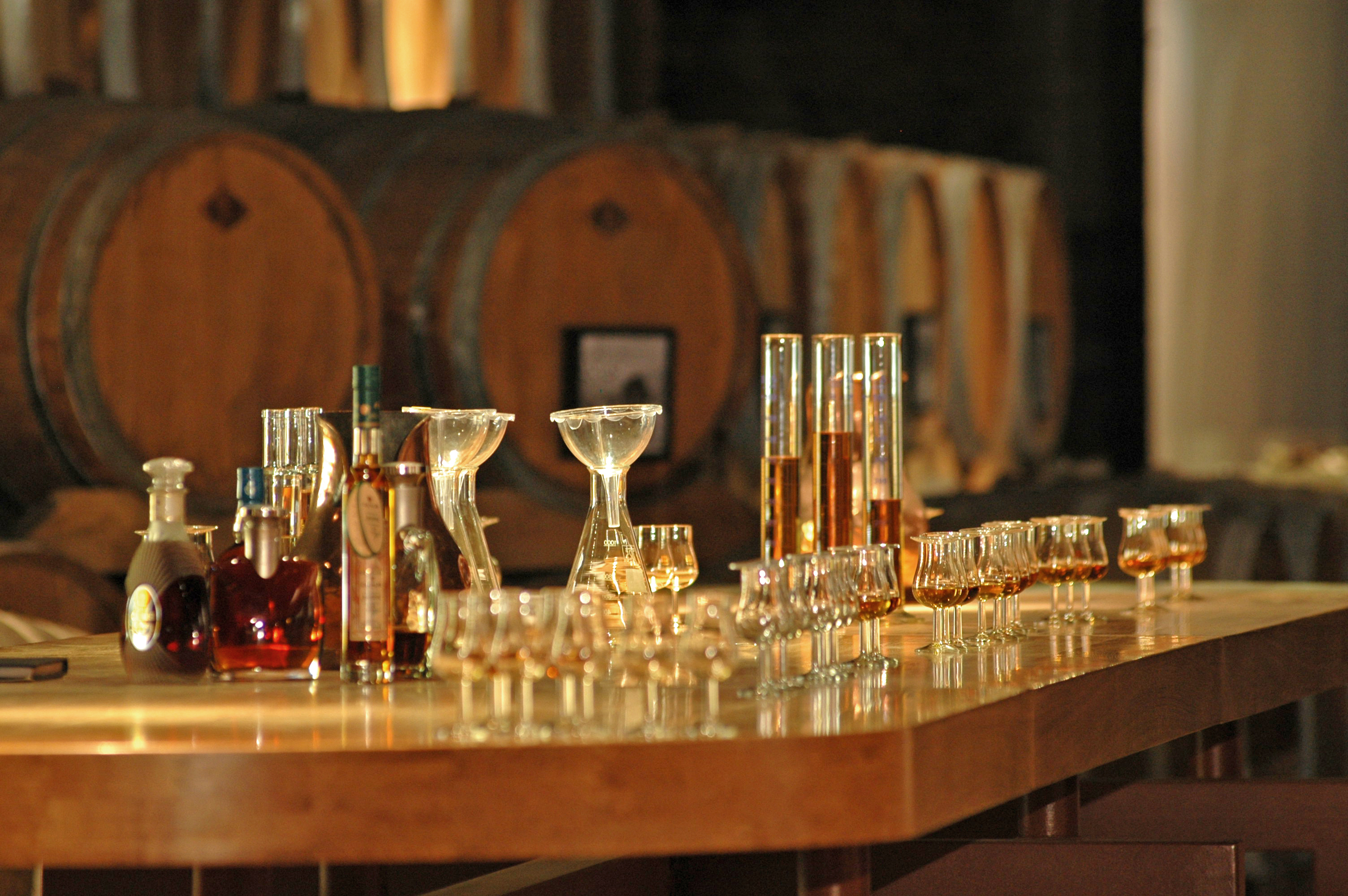
Camus workshop
