= Kizlyar =

Town in the Republic of Dagestan, Russia

Kizlyar Кизляр
- Town

Other transcription(s)
  - Avar: Гъизляр
  - Kumyk: Къызлар
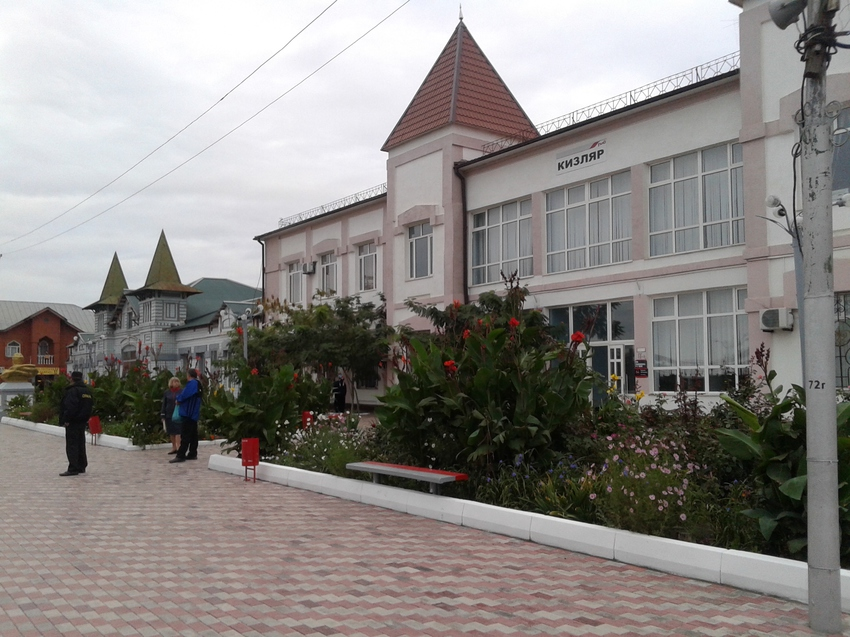
- Kizlyar Station

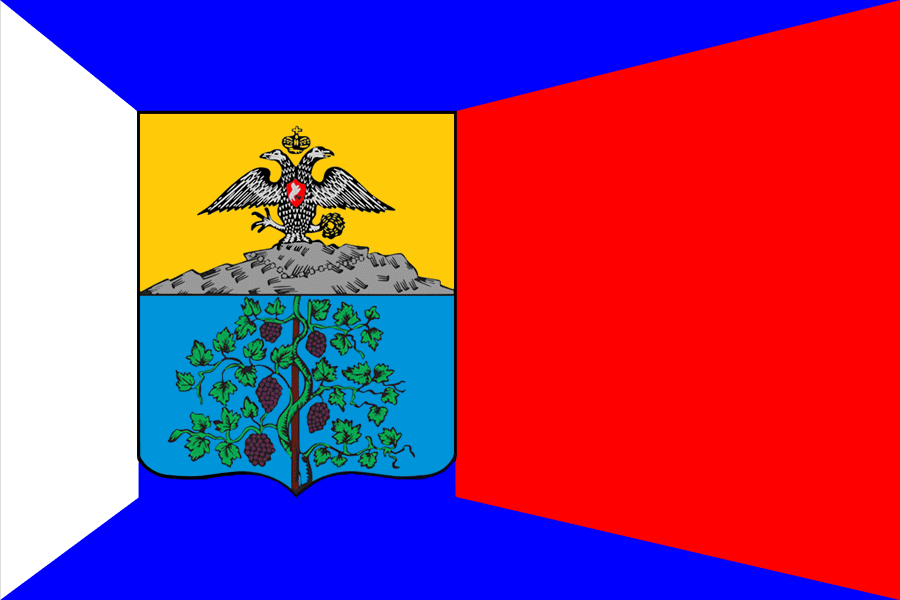
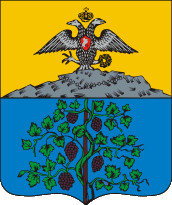
- Flag Coat of arms
- Interactive map of Kizlyar
- Location of Kizlyar Kizlyar (Republic of Dagestan)
- Coordinates: 43°51′17″N 46°42′50″E
- Country: Russia
- Federal subject: Dagestan
- First mentioned: 1609
- Elevation: 1 m (3.3 ft)

Population (2010 Census)
  - Total: 48,984
  - Estimate (2021): 49,999 (+2.1%)

Administrative status
  - Subordinated to: Town of Kizlyar
  - Capital of: Kizlyarsky District, Town of Kizlyar

Municipal status
  - Urban okrug: Kizlyar Urban Okrug
  - Capital of: Kizlyar Urban Okrug, Kizlyarsky Municipal District
- Time zone: UTC+3 (MSK)
- Postal codes: 368830–368833, 368839, 368886
- OKTMO ID: 82730000001
- Website: mo-kizlyar.ru

Kizlyar (Russian: Кизля́р; Avar: Гъизляр; Kumyk: Къызлар, Qızlar) is a town in the Republic of Dagestan, Russia, located on the border with the Chechen Republic in the delta of the Terek River 221 kilometers (137 mi) northwest of Makhachkala, the capital of the republic. As of the 2010 Census, its population was 48,984.

== Etymology ==
According to some researchers, the name of the city comes from an old name for the Terek River. A folk etymology for the name Kizlyar is from an unspecified Turkic language, meaning "girls". (Note: Kiz – "girl"; lar – plural.) According to Vyacheslav Nikonov, the correct translation of this Turkic toponym is "red cliff". (Note: Kizl – "red"; yar – "cliff".)

== History ==
The first documented reference to Kizlyar dates back to 1609, although some historians associate the place with Samandar, the 8th-century capital of Khazaria. In 1735 the Russian government built a fortress in Kizlyar and laid foundations for the Caucasus fortified borderline. In the 18th and 19th centuries, Kizlyar operated as one of the trading posts between Russia and the Middle East and Central Asia. During this period, the population was largely Armenian and Russian. In 1796 2,800 Armenians and 1,000 Russians lived in Kizlyar. During the Russian Empire, the settlement was the administrative capital of the Kizlyarsky Otdel of the Terek Oblast. In 1942 the Germans briefly took Kizylar (Kizjlar).

In January 1996 Chechen separatists raided the local airbase in the course of the Kizlyar raid, which claimed the lives of seventy-eight Russian soldiers.

On February 18, 2018, five people were killed and five wounded after a shooting attack took place outside a Christian church in Kizlyar. Police killed the attacker in a shootout.

== Administrative and municipal status ==
Within the framework of administrative divisions, Kizlyar serves as the administrative center of Kizlyarsky District, even though it is not a part of it. As an administrative division, it is, together with one urban-type settlement (Komsomolsky) and one rural locality (the railway crossing loop of No. 17), incorporated separately as the Town of Kizlyar—an administrative unit with the status equal to that of the districts. As a municipal division, the Town of Kizlyar is incorporated as Kizlyar Urban Okrug.

== Demographics ==
Kizlyar population
- 2021 Census: 49,999
- 2010 Census: 48,984
- 2002 Census: 48,457
- 1989 Census: 39,748
- 1979 Census: 31,320

As of the 2021 Census, the town's ethnic composition was as follows:

- Russians (35.5%)
- Avars (24.5%)
- Dargins (15.5%)
- Kumyks (5.3%)
- Lezgins (4.6%)
- Laks (4.2%)
- Tabasarans (2.0%)
- Azerbaijanis (1.9%)
- Rutuls (1.5%)
- Nogais (1.2%)

== Economy ==
In the early 19th century, Kizlyar became a center of viticulture and wine making. The local cognac factory (Kizlyar Brandy Factory) produces a variety of alcoholic beverages but specializes primarily in a regional variant of brandy, marketed throughout Russia as "cognac". Kizlyarka is a type of grape vodka produced in Kizlyar. Kizlyar is also known for traditional knife, dagger, and saber making.

== Climate ==
Kizlyar has a cold semi-arid climate (Köppen climate classification: BSk).

Climate data for Kizlyar
Month	Jan	Feb	Mar	Apr	May	Jun	Jul	Aug	Sep	Oct	Nov	Dec	Year
Mean daily maximum °C (°F)	1.0 (33.8)	2.2 (36.0)	7.3 (45.1)	16.3 (61.3)	23.1 (73.6)	27.7 (81.9)	30.2 (86.4)	29.6 (85.3)	23.9 (75.0)	16.5 (61.7)	9.1 (48.4)	3.7 (38.7)	15.9 (60.6)
Daily mean °C (°F)	−2.2 (28.0)	−1.3 (29.7)	3.5 (38.3)	11.1 (52.0)	17.8 (64.0)	22.4 (72.3)	25.1 (77.2)	24.3 (75.7)	18.8 (65.8)	12.0 (53.6)	5.7 (42.3)	0.9 (33.6)	11.5 (52.7)
Mean daily minimum °C (°F)	−5.7 (21.7)	−4.3 (24.3)	−0.3 (31.5)	6.0 (42.8)	12.5 (54.5)	17.1 (62.8)	20.0 (68.0)	19.0 (66.2)	13.8 (56.8)	7.6 (45.7)	2.4 (36.3)	−1.9 (28.6)	7.2 (44.9)
Average precipitation mm (inches)	17 (0.7)	19 (0.7)	20 (0.8)	31 (1.2)	39 (1.5)	47 (1.9)	28 (1.1)	23 (0.9)	30 (1.2)	31 (1.2)	28 (1.1)	21 (0.8)	334 (13.1)
Source: Climate-Data.org

== Twin towns and sister cities ==
Kizlyar has sister city relationships with:

- Baku, Azerbaijan
- Budyonnovsk, Stavropol Krai, Russia
- Azov, Rostov Oblast, Russia

== Notable people ==
- Roman Bagration (1778–1834), general in the Imperial Russian Army
- Pyotr Bagration (1765-1812), general in the Imperial Russian Army
- Romanos Melikian (1883–1935), composer
- Rasul Mirzaev (born 1986), mixed martial artist
- Tagir Gadzhiev (born 1994), Russian international Rugby player
