= Kizlyarsky District =

Kizlyarsky District Кизлярский район (Russian)
- District

Other transcription(s)
  - Avar: Гъизляр мухъ
  - Dargwa: Къизлярла къатI
  - Nogai: Кызлар район
- Coat of arms
- Location of Kizlyarsky District in the Republic of Dagestan
- Coordinates: 43°51′N 46°43′E
- Country: Russia
- Federal subject: Republic of Dagestan
- Established: 22 November 1928
- Administrative center: Kizlyar

Area
  - Total: 3,047 km^{2} (1,176 sq mi)

Population (2010 Census)
  - Total: 67,287
  - Density: 22.08/km^{2} (57.19/sq mi)
  - Urban: 0%
  - Rural: 100%

Administrative structure
  - Administrative divisions: 19 Selsoviets
  - Inhabited localities: 84 rural localities

Municipal structure
  - Municipally incorporated as: Kizlyarsky Municipal District
  - Municipal divisions: 0 urban settlements, 22 rural settlements
- Time zone: UTC+3 (MSK)
- OKTMO ID: 82627000
- Website: http://kizlyar-rayon.ru

Population of Kizlyarsky District
- 2010 Census: 67,287
- 2002 Census: 57,748
- 1989 Census: 49,631
- 1979 Census: 42,767

Kizlyarsky District (Russian: Кизля́рский райо́н) is an administrative and municipal district (raion), one of the forty-one in the Republic of Dagestan, Russia. It is located in the north of the republic. The area of the district is 3,047 square kilometers or 1,176 square miles. Its administrative center is the town of Kizlyar (which is not administratively a part of the district). As of the 2010 Census, the total population of the district was 67,287.

== Administrative and municipal status ==
Within the framework of administrative divisions, Kizlyarsky District is one of the forty-one in the republic. It is divided into nineteen selsoviets, comprising eighty-four rural localities. The town of Kizlyar serves as its administrative center, despite being incorporated separately as an administrative unit with the status equal to that of the districts.

As a municipal division, the district is incorporated as Kizlyarsky Municipal District. Its nineteen selsoviets are incorporated as twenty-two rural settlements within the municipal district. The Town of Kizlyar is incorporated separately from the district as Kizlyar Urban Okrug, but serves as the administrative center of the municipal district as well.
