= List of Bartender episodes =

The anime television series Bartender is based on the manga series of the same name written and illustrated by Araki Joh. The series was directed by Masaki Watanabe, written by Yasuhiro Imagawa, and produced by Palm Studio. It originally aired from October 15 to December 31, 2006, on Fuji TV. The episodes were later combined into five DVDs, released by Pony Canyon from December 20, 2006, to April 18, 2007. The opening theme song is "Bartender", while the ending theme song is "Hajimari no Hito" (始まりのヒト), both performed by Natural High, with the opening theme song featuring Junpei Shiina.

In November 2010, through the 24th issue of Super Jump, it was announced the production of a Japanese television drama series starring Masaki Aiba. Directed by Osamu Katayama and written by Natsuko Takahashi, it aired on TV Asahi's "Friday Night Drama" programming block programming block from February 4, 2011, to April 1, 2011. On August 5, 2011, TC Entertainment released all episodes in a Blu-ray Disc box set.

A new anime project was announced on October 21, 2022. It was later revealed to be a television reboot series, titled Bartender: Glass of God (バーテンダー 神のグラス, Bātendā: Kami no Gurasu), produced by Liber and directed by Ryōichi Kuraya, with Mariko Kunisawa writing the scripts, Yōichi Ueda designing the characters and serving as chief animation director, and Hiroaki Tsutsumi serving as music composer. The series aired from April 4 to June 20, 2024, on TV Tokyo. (Note: TV Tokyo lists the 2024 anime series premiere on April 3 at 24:00, which is effectively April 4 at midnight JST.) The opening theme song is "Stardust Memory", performed by Takaya Kawasaki, while the ending theme song is "Spica", performed by Mone Kamishiraishi. Crunchyroll licensed the series. Medialink licensed the series in Southeast Asia and Oceania (except Australia and New Zealand), and will streaming on its Ani-One Asia YouTube channel.

== Episodes ==
=== 2006 series ===
#	Title	Original air date
1	"Bartender"; Transliteration: "Bātendā" (Japanese: バーテンダー)	October 15, 2006
At the bar Eden Hall in Ginza, Ryū Sasakura creates cocktails dubbed "The Glass of the Gods." Hotel redesigner Kamishima holds deep disregard for bartenders because of an embarrassing mistake he made as a younger man. He is shown the skill of the profession by Ryū, who creates a simple water-mix (mizuwari) by smashing Eden Hall's signature ice cup. Kamishima's bar redesign incorporates Ryū's explanation of the importance of bars. The featured cocktail is the Grasshopper.
2	"Menu of the Heart"; Transliteration: "Kokoro no Menyū" (Japanese: 心のメニュー)	October 29, 2006
Miwa Kurushima comes to Eden Hall to ask Ryū to find her "Menu of the Heart." As a child, she broke a bottle of alcohol intended to mend the rift between her father and Taizō Kurushima, her grandfather. The two had been fighting over modernizing the family hotel. Shortly after this accident, Miwa's parents were killed in a car crash. Ryū extrapolates that the beverage was Suntory's Kakubin (referred to in the show as "Kaku"), a beverage at the crossroad of old and new Japan. The featured cocktail is the Nikolaschka.
3	"Glass of Regret"; Transliteration: "Kōkai no Gurasu" (Japanese: 後悔のグラス)	November 5, 2006
Shimaoka, the head of an advertising company, is retiring, and his old love, the actress Mieko Yuzuki, has just died. The two of them wanted to perform together in Henrik Ibsen's A Doll's House, until he decided to take over his family's company. Ryū uses the Margarita and its history to show Shimaoka that love can live on. The featured cocktail is the Margarita.
4	"Amber Dream"; Transliteration: "Kohaku no Yume" (Japanese: 琥珀の夢)	November 12, 2006
Ryū assists a couple on their first date. Meanwhile, Sayo Yusada is waiting for her husband for their anniversary, however the two have grown apart. Ryū mixes the Bijou Cocktail, then creates an Amber Dream from it. He explains that amber takes time to get its beauty, much like a marriage and the time a couple puts into it. The featured cocktails are the Bijou and Amber Dream.
5	"Things Forgotten In a Bar"; Transliteration: "Bā no Wasuremono" (Japanese: バーの忘れ物)	November 19, 2006
A young salesmen, Shibata, is given a transfer notice from his boss after his sales figures are low. Ryū lifts the young man's spirits by telling him about Ernest Hemingway and the story The Old Man and the Sea. The featured cocktail is the Daiquiri.
6	"The Story Inside the Glass"; Transliteration: "Gurasu no Naka no Monogatari" (Japanese: グラスの中の物語)	November 26, 2006
Shizuo Kasahara, a screenwriter, has been having trouble writing scripts. He poses a riddle to various bartenders, having ordered four brands of single malt Scottish whiskeys (Laphroaig, Miltonduff, Glenburgie, and Ardbeg), asks what should be next. After going to several bars, his long-time friend and director Ryūji Mineyama catches up with Kasahara and they argue over why their productions are no longer original. Ryū answers the riddle, and by doing so helps the two men with their problem. The featured cocktail is the Aberdeen Angus.
7	"Closed Day for the Bar"; Transliteration: "Bā no Kyūjitsu" (Japanese: バーの休日)	December 3, 2006
Ryū has fallen ill and the bar is closed for the day. Two senior bartenders who visit Ryū decide to concoct some drinks to help him. In the meantime, two customers enter the bar: Kōji Sōma, a politician embroiled in a scandalous court case and endlessly pursued by the paparazzi, and a female lawyer who is supposed to meet Kōji to discuss the case but misses the time. The two bartenders separately give the customers "Rusty Nail" and "Bull Shot", who eventually arrange to meet again. The featured drink is the Rusty Nail.
8	"The Lie at the Counter"; Transliteration: "Kauntā no Uso" (Japanese: カウンターの嘘)	December 10, 2006
Ryū serves Angel's Tip to a young dating couple. The man claims to be a doctor, but his behaviour causes Ryū to suspect that he is a con-man, seeking to cheat the woman. The man challenges Ryū to perform a "taste test" with five glasses of water containing a drop of a different pastis. Ryū turns away and he switches the positions of the glasses and Ryū has to guess the names of the drinks. Ryū correctly identifies the drinks, including one glass where the man added a second pastis. Having lost the challenge, the man does not continue his charade with the woman. The featured drink is "Pastis Water".
9	"The Bar's Face"; Transliteration: "Bā no Kao" (Japanese: バーの顔)	December 17, 2006
On a rainy night in Ginza, Miwa runs towards Eden Hall seeking shelter from the storm only to find a "Reserved" sign posted on the front door. A nearby street vendor explains to her that every year on this particular day, the bar is closed for a single customer. The vendor proceeds to tell the story in flashback of Ryū's early days as an apprentice at Bar Saito when he served an inappropriate cocktail. On that evening, an important looking businessman named Ryūichi Minegishi arrived at Bar Saito with an attractive companion, Kanako. She ordered a champagne cocktail and Ryū served her Champagne Pick-Me-Up in a tall flute glass which Kanako rejected. Ryū later learned that drinking from a tall glass would have exposed her neck and lines of ageing. It transpires that Minegishi is actually quite poor, but likes to maintain the impression of being wealthy. The cocktail featured in this episode is the Gin & Tonic.
10	"Christmas Miracle"; Transliteration: "Kurisumasu no Kiseki" (Japanese: クリスマスの奇跡)	December 24, 2006
Professor Okita, an unworldly specialist in computational fluid dynamics enters Eden Hall on a Christmas night after being entranced by seeing Miwa and following her. He refuses Ryū's recommendation of having a champagne, and downs a glass of Guinness beer instead. Afterwards, Ryū offers Okita a Black Velvet, which is a mixture of beer and champagne. He doubts that Ryū could pour the drink without it bubbling over the glass, based on his years of research and study of fluid mechanics. However, Ryū successfully pours the beer and champagne simultaneously, without the mixture spilling out of the glass. The narrator mentions that Ryū is among the few bartenders in Japan who are able to mix the Black Velvet perfectly by pouring the liquids simultaneously. The featured drink of in this episode is Black Velvet.
11	"Water of Life"; Transliteration: "Inochi no Mizu" (Japanese: 命の水)	December 31, 2006
Ryū completes his apprenticeship at Eden Hall and the episode revolves mostly around the life of a bartender. A few cocktails are featured in the episode, such as the Red Eye, No Name and Rob Roy. Ryū and the senior bartenders explain the meaning and purpose of bartending and the importance of meeting the needs of the customers. They mention the bottle of "Macallan 1946", a rare and expensive whisky made using peat during World War II, which is passed through every generation of bartenders at Eden Hall. They regard the spirits they use as "The Water of Life", Ryū states that he is fortunate to have not just learned the craft of bar-tending, but rather choosing the life of a bartender. The final featured drink is a "Bartender".

=== 2024 series ===
No.	Title (Note: All English titles are taken from Crunchyroll.)	Directed by (Note: Information is taken from the ending credits of each episode.)	Written by	Storyboarded by	Original release date
1	"A Gentle Perch"; Transliteration: "Yasashī Tomari ki" (Japanese: 優しい止まり木)	Ryoichi Kuratani	Mariko Kunisawa	Ryoichi Kuratani	April 4, 2024
Two young women, Miwa Kurushima and Yukari Higuchi, are tasked with finding a bartender for a counter-style bar in the new Hotel Cardinal which opened a couple of months earlier. A number of bartenders have applied, but the Business Planning Division manager, Kamishima, has rejected them all because none have met his high expectations. Three new experienced applicants take the test, but they all fail for various reasons. Also, the chairman wants a bartender who can make the "Glass of God". The women encounter Ryū Sasakura in a park who left a book on cocktails behind. They come across the Edenhall bar in Ginza where they find Ryū is working, and he impresses them with his perception of the needs of the client, attention to detail and his skills. They decide he may be the bartender they are looking for.
2	"Old Friends / One for the Road"; Transliteration: "Yasashī Tomari ki" (Japanese: 古き仲間)	Atsuko Tonomizu & Hidehiko Kahora	Mariko Kunisawa	Atsuko Tonomizu	April 11, 2024
While filling in at Edenhall bar, long time customer Taizo Kurushima, chairman and CEO of Hotel Cardinal, visits and Ryū Sasakura serves him a selection of cocktails. Kurushima declares that they are all awful and instead requests a drink of sake. Miwa and Yukari find Ryū and offer him a job but he declines. Ryū invites CEO Kurushima back to Edenhall and this time offers him the cocktail that the former owner and Kurushima's friend used to serve, an "Old Pal". This time Kurushima is impressed and gives Ryū his card. Miwa and Yukari again visit Edenhall to convince Ryū to work for them, but they are interrupted by an exhausted and harassed woman escaping from the heavy rain outside. She asks for a drink and Ryū makes her a "Bull Shot" which both satisfies her and calms her down. The pleasant experience causes her to change her harsh manner at the legal firm where she works.
3	"The Perfect Taste"; Transliteration: "Kanpekina Aji" (Japanese: 完璧な味)	Ryo Miyata	Mariko Kunisawa	Ryoichi Kuratani	April 18, 2024
CEO Kurushima contrives for Ryū to compete against the award-winning bartender Kuzuhara Ryuichi who works at Bar K at the Hotel Diamondstar and is known as Mister Perfect. Kuzuhara visits the Edenhall and tests Ryū's knowledge and ability by ordering a "Gin Fizz". He is pleasantly surprised by its unique taste, however he is unimpressed by Ryū's experimentation. On a rainy night, Kurushima invites Ryū to Bar K and asks Ryū and Kuzuhara to make the same cocktail, a "Manhattan". He invites Miwa to be the judge and initially she prefers Ryū's because he made it slightly warmer, but Kuzuhara's is more accurate in taste and he is declared the winner. Kuzuhara accuses Ryū of sacrificing accuracy to please his customers.
4	"A Bar's Secret Ingredient – The Face of a Martini"; Transliteration: "Bā no Kakushimi / Matīni no Kao" (Japanese: バーの隠し味 / マティーニの顔)	Ryo Miyata	Mariko Kunisawa	Shinichi Watanabe	April 25, 2024
The chef at Hotel Cardinal is leaving and Chairman Kurushima asks Kamishima to get Ryū to convince the fussy prospective chef Yamanouchi to run the hotel's restaurant. After dinner, Kamishima takes Yamanouchi to Edenhall where Ryū gives him a blind taste test of an aged Japanese mirin which comes across as a European sherry which causes Yamanouchi to question his preconceptions. Later, while Miwa and Yukari are still at Edenhall, the trainee bartender, Kawakami Kyouko, enters and is despondent because he boss told her that her Martini "had no face." Ryū explains that each Martini is different, but the character and fragrance of the gin must show through.
5	"The First Drop"; Transliteration: "Hajimari no Itteki" (Japanese: 始まりの一滴)	Kentaro Mizuno	Mariko Kunisawa	Ryoichi Kuratani	May 2, 2024
Ryū takes his young bartender friends, Kyouko Kawakami from Bar Minami, Yuri Kinjou from Hell's Arms and Kelvin Chen from Bar K on a day visit to the Yamazaki whisky distillery. Kelvin appears distant, and it is revealed that he formed an attachment to Chitose, the daughter of the hotel owner where he stayed with his father 12 years earlier. He promised to take her to the Gion festival but they did not go and he still regrets it. Ryū encourages Kelvin to try the harsh new pot whisky before it is matured in barrels for many years to let go of his regrets and mature himself. Meanwhile, Kyouko and Yuri enjoy themselves so much visiting local bars that they miss the last train home.
6	"The True Face"; Transliteration: "Hontō no Kao" (Japanese: 本当の顔)	Ryo Miyata	Mariko Kunisawa	Atsuko Tonomizu	May 9, 2024
Yukari Higuchi announces suddenly that she is to be married, much to the surprise of her friends. Meanwhile Hayase, a manager at an industrial machinery company, is under pressure at work. When he encounters a woman smoking in Edenhall, he acts uncharacteristically rudely towards her. When he visits again and apologizes, Ryū invites him behind the bar so that he can share some information about the woman's situation as a co-worker. Hayase revisits the bar a number of times and eventually encounters the woman again. He apologizes to her and they become friends. Meanwhile, Yukari confesses to Ryū that she only announced her engagement to please her ailing grandmother and realizes that it was for the wrong reason. The featured cocktail is an Alexander.
7	"A Bartender's Resolve"; Transliteration: "Bātendā no Kakugo" (Japanese: バーテンダーの覚悟)	Keita Nakano	Mariko Kunisawa	Rion Kujo	May 16, 2024
The Business Planning Division of the Cardinal Hotel hold meeting to decide on welcome drinks for the hotel, but cannot decide. Miwa and Yukari go to Edenhall to ask Ryū for guidance, and Kelvin arrives and asks if Ryū can show him how make to the "Glass of God". His father owns a grand hotel in Singapore and his eldest son was to be his successor but he died. He is visiting Japan and wants Kelvin to take the post, however Kelvin wants to be a bartender and he hopes to impress his father with his bar-tending skills. He learns from Ryū that the aim of the bartender is hospitality and the ability to mix a drink that will "soothe the soul" of the guest sitting at the bar. Kelvin does manage to impress his father, however he still insists that Kelvin returns to Singapore with him. The featured cocktail is the Singapore Sling.
8	"A Challenge"; Transliteration: "Chōsen" (Japanese: 挑戦)	Fumikazu Sato, Keita Nakano	Ryoichi Kuratani	Fumikazu Sato	May 16, 2024
Chairman Kurushima asks Ryū to observe the Japan Cocktail Award finals and share his observations. The contestants must prepare and present a unique cocktail which displays creative innovation. Kyouko Kawakami, Yuri Kinjou and Kelvin Chen, who did not return to the United States with his father, enter the competition. Yuri makes a "Chimugukuru" which refers to her childhood in Okinawa, Kyouko is initially very nervous but successfully presents her cocktail "Headwind", and Kelvin presents "Lion City" that represents his origin in Singapore although he accidentally drops the cocktail shaker while pouring and presents only one glass. Kelvin admits that he was driven by the need to be praised and accepted by others but realizes that he should just focus on being the best bartender he can be. Following the competition, Kurushima invites Kyouko to work the bar at Cardinal Hotel and Kelvin returns to Singapore, to run the bar in his father's hotel.
9	"North Wind"; Transliteration: "Kitakaze" (Japanese: 北風)	Fumikazu Sato & Keita Nakano	Ryoichi Kuratani	Atsuko Tonomizu	May 30, 2024
Miwa asks Ryu to accompany her to a "hidden" bar, but they stumble into dingy bar called "North Wind" (Note: The name is a combination of "Kita" meaning "North" and "Wind" comes from the Japanese word for "Wind" used in the name of their mentor, Goro Kase's bar "Bar Kaze".) instead at street level run by Ryu's former senpai Kitakata, whom he has not seen for eight years. When a hostess come in with a male client, Kitakata makes Bloody Caesars with a high alcohol vodka and tomato juice containing clam broth which makes a powerful tasting-drink that disguises the taste of alcohol. The man becomes quickly inebriated and they leave causing Ryu to berate Kitakata for making such a strong drink. However, Kitakata explains that she is a regular who was sold into service at a young age and now survives by scamming her clients. Later, Kitakata and the woman visit Edenhall and because she usually drinks shochu, Ryu makes two Caipirinha's, but slightly differently to suit their tastes and Kitakata is impressed. He takes Ryu to see their mentor, Goro Kase, who is now in hospital and when Kase sees Ryu, he asks if he is still searching for "The Glass of God". Miwa visits Kitakata's bar and says she cannot understand why Ryu will not work for the Cardinal Hotel. Kitakata confides that after Ryu won a cocktail competition in Europe and one of his clients died, Ryu blamed himself and returned to Japan seeking obscurity.
10	"A Thorn in the Heart"; Transliteration: "Kokoro no Toge" (Japanese: 心のとげ)	JOL-chan	Mariko Kunisawa	Hidetoshi Omori	June 6, 2024
Ryū Sasakura wrestles with guilt from a former customer's suicide, which has kept him from accepting an offer to work at Hotel Cardinal. Miwa confronts him about his past and encourages him to face his emotional wounds. At the same time, Hayase considers moving to the United States but changes his mind after a meaningful reunion with Kimishima at Edenhall.
11	"Bar Kaze – A Heartfelt Recipe"; Transliteration: "Bā Kaze / Kokoro no Menyū" (Japanese: バー・風 / 心のメニュー)	Ryo Miyata	Mariko Kunisawa	Atsuko Tonomizu	June 13, 2024
The ailing Goro Kase is released from hospital for a short time, so Kitakata and Ryu set up "Bar Kaze" for one day and many bartenders who knew him arrive to pay their respects. Kase dons his uniform and mixes cocktails for the guests aided by Kitakata and Ryu and finally sets alight shots of vodka for his customers who had passed. Ryu recalls that it was from Kase that he learned that bartending was not just a job, but a lifestyle that one chooses. Later, Miwa asks Ryu for help to locate a bottle of expensive alcohol that her father bought to reconcile with his father 25 years earlier, but which the young Miwa accidentally broke before the meeting. Ryu concludes that it was a crystal kakubin (角瓶; square bottle) of Suntory whisky which they present to her grandfather, Taizo Kurushima. He is impressed by Miwa's thoughtfulness and extremely grateful for both Ryu's skill and ability to meet his customer's needs.
12	"An Important Job"; Transliteration: "Tai Setsuna Shigoto" (Japanese: たいせつな仕事)	Keita Nakano	Mariko Kunisawa	Ryoichi Kuratani	June 20, 2024
The novelist Kurosawa Junichiro, stuck with writer's block, visits Edenhall and is inspired after Sasakura serves him a cocktail called "Sledgehammer," which reflects the essence of the legendary "Glass of God." Sasakura finally agrees to join Hotel Cardinal on the condition that the Edenhall name and its values are maintained. The story ends with the opening of the new Edenhall, welcoming familiar faces and marking a hopeful new beginning.

=== Drama ===
#	Title	Original air date
1	Transliteration: "Arashi o Yobu Otoko VS Densetsu Hoteru Ō...Eikyū ni Mazui Sake" (Japanese: 嵐を呼ぶ男VS伝説ホテル王...永久にまずい酒)	February 4, 2011
2	Transliteration: "Kiken na Onna Gokai...Utsukushi Sugiru Shinyū no Himitsu" (Japanese: 危険な女子会...美しすぎる親友の秘密)	February 11, 2011
3	Transliteration: "40 Onna Kekkon Yamemasu!! Moteki Tōrai...Maboroshi no Kakuteru" (Japanese: 40女結婚やめます!! モテキ到来...幻のカクテル)	February 18, 2011
4	Transliteration: "Namida no Doku-iri Kakuteru...12-ji Kabukichō Shinderera" (Japanese: 涙の毒入りカクテル...12時歌舞伎町シンデレラ)	February 25, 2011
5	Transliteration: "Haha to Mitomenai!! Ginza no Nyote Musume ni Nokosu Saigo no Ippai" (Japanese: 母と認めない!! 銀座の女帝 娘に遺す最期の一杯)	March 4, 2011
6	Transliteration: "Ano Hito ni Yūki o Moratta...Ima Koso Saikō no Ippai o" (Japanese: あの人に勇気をもらった...今こそ最高の一杯を)	March 18, 2011
7	Transliteration: "Sai Shūshō!! Sayonara...Rapan no Hibi" (Japanese: 最終章!! さよなら...ラパンの日々)	March 25, 2011
8	Transliteration: "Konya Kanketsu!! Kimi e Sasagu Saigo no Gurasu...Tatoe Nidoto Aenakutemo" (Japanese: 今夜完結!! 君へ捧ぐ最後のグラス... たとえ二度と逢えなくても)	April 1, 2011
