= Brandy Alexander =

Brandy-based cocktail of cognac and crème de cacao

Alexander
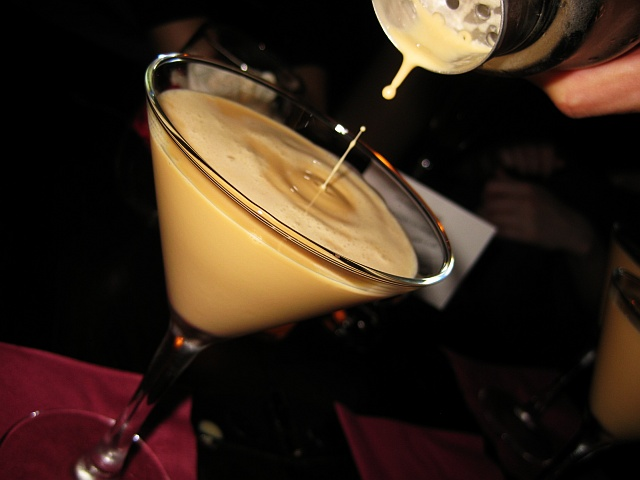
- Type: Cocktail
- Ingredients: 30 ml Cognac; 30 ml Crème de cacao (brown); 30 ml fresh cream
- Standard drinkware: Cocktail glass
- Standard garnish: Sprinkle fresh ground nutmeg on top.
- Served: Straight up: chilled, without ice
- Preparation: Pour all ingredients into cocktail shaker filled with ice cubes. Shake and strain into a chilled cocktail glass.

A Brandy Alexander is a brandy-based dessert cocktail, consisting of cognac, crème de cacao, and cream, that became popular during the early 20th century. It is a variation of an earlier, gin-based cocktail called simply an Alexander. The cocktail known as Alexander today may contain gin or brandy. Ice cream can be added for a "frozen Brandy Alexander".

== History ==
There are many rumours about the origins of the cocktail. Some sources say it was created at the time of the London wedding of Princess Mary and Viscount Lascelles in 1922. Drama critic and Algonquin Round Table member Alexander Woollcott said it was named after him. Other sources say it was named after the Russian tsar Alexander II.

The drink was possibly named after Troy Alexander, a bartender at Rector's, a New York City restaurant, who created the drink in order to serve a white drink at a dinner celebrating Phoebe Snow, a character in a popular advertising campaign in the early 20th century.

John Lennon was introduced to it on March 12, 1974, by Harry Nilsson, on Lennon's so-called "lost weekend". The pair began heckling the Smothers Brothers, and whilst being ejected Lennon allegedly assaulted a waitress. Lennon later said the drinks "tasted like milkshakes".

== In film and television ==
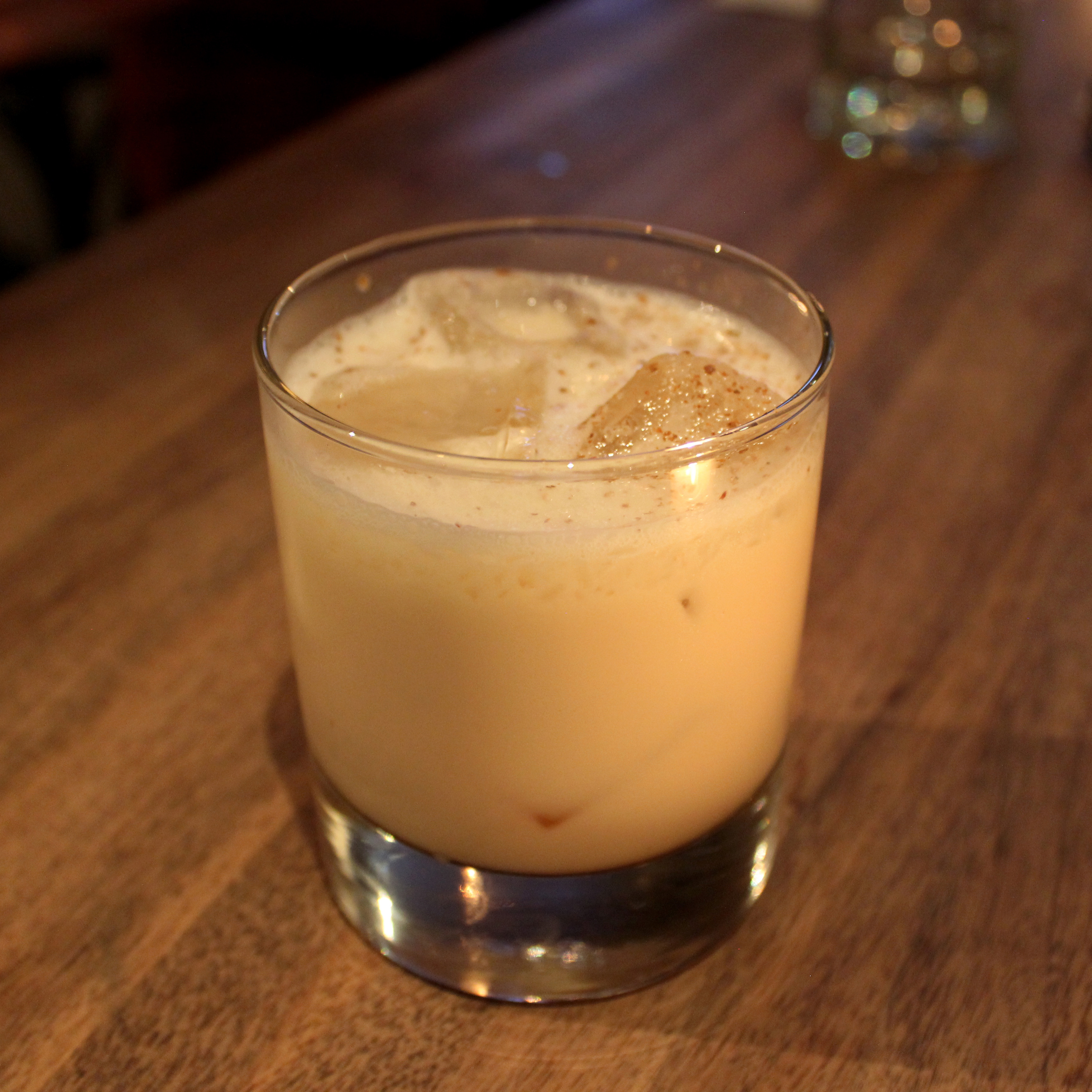
A Brandy Alexander served on the rocks

In the 1962 film Days of Wine and Roses, alcoholic Joe Clay, played by Jack Lemmon, takes Kirsten Arnesen, played by Lee Remick, out on a date. When she explains that she dislikes liquor but likes chocolate, he orders her a Brandy Alexander, thus beginning Kirsten's descent into alcoholism.

In the 1970 pilot of the television series, The Mary Tyler Moore Show, the namesake character adds to a running gag by asking for a Brandy Alexander during a job interview.

In the 1981 film Tattoo, Bruce Dern takes Maud Adams out for dinner and orders a Brandy Alexander. When she comments that he does not look the Brandy Alexander type, he replies, "I like the foam...it reminds me of the ocean."

In the 1981 television adaptation of Brideshead Revisited (discussed below), Anthony Blanche (Nickolas Grace) takes Charles Ryder (Jeremy Irons) out for drinks, ordering four Brandy Alexanders for the two of them: "I expect you would prefer sherry, but my dear Charles, you're not going to have sherry tonight. You're going to try this delicious concoction instead." When Charles reacts hesitantly to his first sip, Anthony proceeds to drink all four cocktails in rapid succession.

In "Indian Summer", the eleventh episode of the first series of Mad Men, Peggy Olson is seen drinking a Brandy Alexander on a date. Peggy says Joan Holloway often orders the drink for her, but that it is usually sweeter.

In the 2008 James Gray movie Two Lovers, Michelle (Gwyneth Paltrow) tells Leonard (Joaquin Phoenix) she drinks Brandy Alexanders with her boyfriend Ronald, a wealthy lawyer. Leonard orders one at a restaurant to impress her, but ruins the effect by mistaking the stirrer for a straw.

== In print ==
The character Brandy Alexander in the novel Invisible Monsters by Chuck Palahniuk is named after the drink.

Anthony Blanche orders four "Alexandra cocktails" in Evelyn Waugh's novel Brideshead Revisited. Christian Kracht repeats the four Brandy Alexanders motif in his 1995 novel Faserland.

In Kurt Vonnegut's book, Mother Night, the protagonist suspects that an overly flattering article in the Herald Tribune about his neighbor was "written by a pansy full of Brandy Alexanders." In Helen Garner’s 1977 Melbourne based novel ‘Monkey Grip’ Brandy Alexanders resurface periodically.

== See also ==
- List of cocktails
