= Stinger (cocktail) =

Cocktail made from crème de menthe and brandy

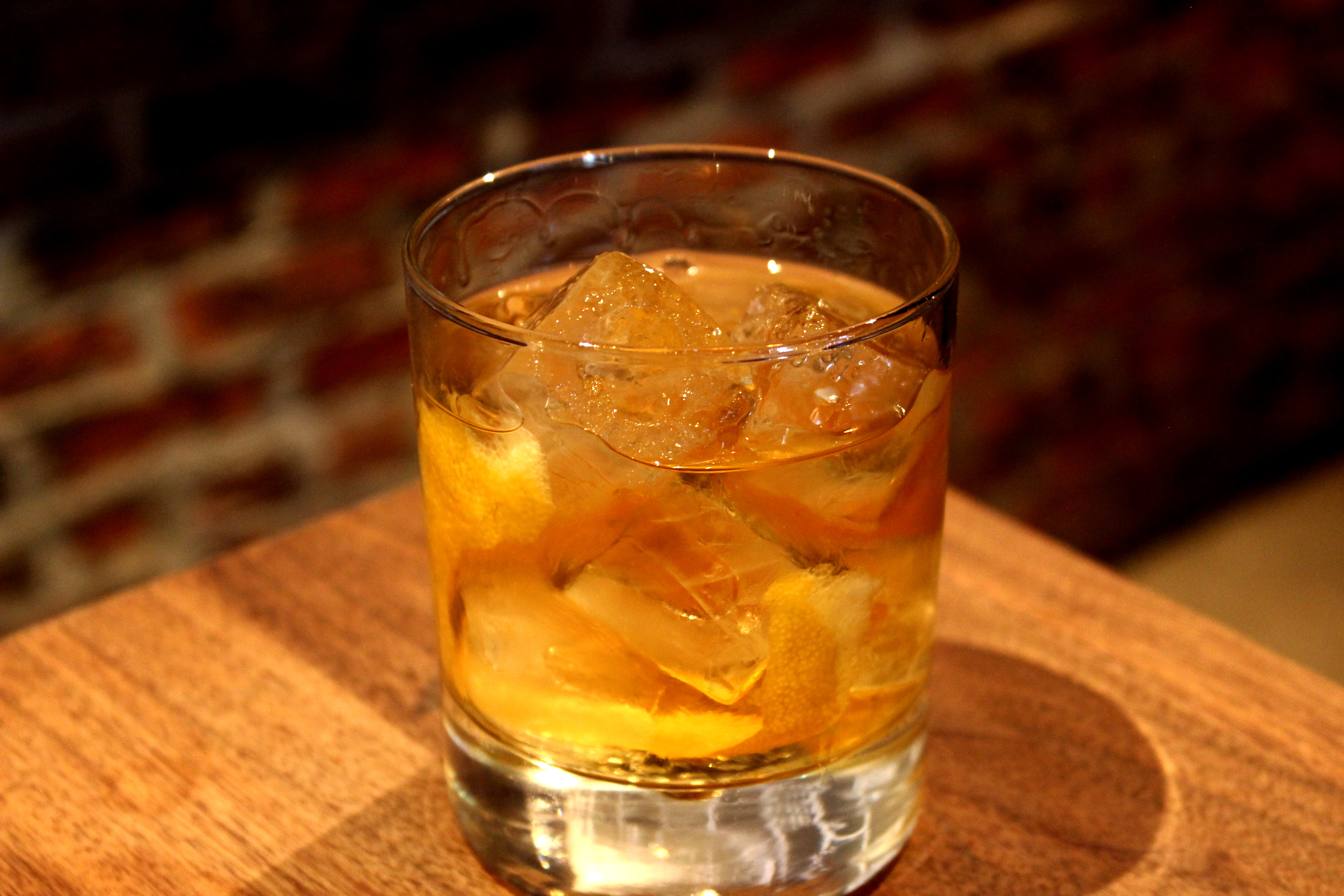
- Stinger cocktail served over ice in a rocks glass
- Type: Cocktail
- Ingredients: 50 ml cognac; 20 ml white crème de menthe
- Base spirit: Cognac
- Standard drinkware: Cocktail glass
- Standard garnish: Optional mint leaf
- Served: Straight up: chilled, without ice
- Preparation: Pour all ingredients into mixing glass with ice cubes. Stir well. Strain into chilled martini cocktail glass.

A stinger is a duo cocktail made by adding crème de menthe to brandy (although recipes vary). The cocktail's origins can be traced to the United States in the 1890s, and the beverage remained widely popular in America until the 1970s. It was seen as a drink of the upper class, and has had a somewhat wide cultural impact.

== History of the cocktail ==
The stinger originated about 1890. The cocktail may have been derived from The Judge, a cocktail made with brandy, crème de menthe, and simple syrup found in William Schmidt's 1892 cocktail book The Flowing Bowl. It was immediately popular in New York City, and quickly became known as a "society" drink (i.e. only for the upper classes). According to bartender Jere Sullivan in his 1930 volume The Drinks of Yesteryear: A Mixology, the stinger remained a critical component of the bartender's repertoire until Prohibition.

The stinger was not initially seen as a cocktail (i.e., a drink served before dinner), but rather a digestif (after-dinner drink). Writing in the 1910s and 1920s, humorist Don Marquis's "Hermione" (a fictional daffy society do-gooder) refused to refer to the stinger as a cocktail, indicating its status in upper-class society. Over time, however, the stinger came to be consumed like a cocktail.

The stinger was a popular drink during Prohibition in the United States, for crème de menthe could mask the taste of the inferior-quality brandies then available. The stinger began to lose favor with Americans in the late 1970s, and was not a well-known cocktail in the early 21st century.

== Recipe ==
The stinger is a duo cocktail, in that it uses only two ingredients: a spirit and a liqueur. The classic stinger recipe uses three parts brandy and one part white crème de menthe. However, stinger recipes vary, and some recipes call for equal parts brandy and crème de menthe. The mixture was originally stirred, although modern recipes call for it to be shaken with cracked ice. Early recipes required that a stinger be served straight up, but since the end of Prohibition in the United States it became more common for it to be served over crushed ice.

Cognac, a type of brandy, was identified as the basis for the stinger as early as 1905 in William "Cocktail" Boothby's supplement to his 1900 book, American Bar-Tender. In the 21st century, cognac is the most commonly used brandy cited by recipes for the stinger's base liquor.

Cocktail guides recommend that it be served in a cocktail glass if served straight, or in a rocks glass if served with ice.

=== Variations ===
The amaretto stinger uses a 3-to-1 ratio of amaretto to white crème de menthe, while an Irish stinger uses equal parts Irish cream liqueur and white crème de menthe.

The Mexican stinger substitutes tequila for brandy.

A "vodka stinger", also known as a white spider, uses vodka instead of brandy.

The white way cocktail, which celebrates Broadway theatre, is a stinger made with gin rather than brandy.

Mixologists Oliver Said and James Mellgren cite a cocktail known as the stinger sour. It is made with a 3-to-1-to-1 ratio of bourbon, peppermint schnapps, and lemon juice. This cocktail is not technically a stinger, since it omits the crème de menthe.

== Cultural impact ==
The stinger's popularity in New York City was so great that urban legends attributed the cocktail's genesis to millionaire Reginald Vanderbilt. It was further said that the stinger was Vanderbilt's favorite cocktail, and he spent hours making them for his guests. He would shake them up for himself and friends in his barroom, always with a dash of absinthe added. But Vanderbilt did not call this drink the Brant or the Bartholdi—he called it the Stinger.

The stinger's reputation as a high-society drink led to its appearance in several novels. James Bond and Tiffany Case each have a stinger in the 1956 Ian Fleming novel Diamonds are Forever. The spy Alec Leamas drinks stingers in John le Carré's 1963 novel The Spy Who Came in from the Cold.

The vodka stinger was the drink of choice for Joanne in the musical Company by Stephen Sondheim, with her calling for one in the song "The Ladies Who Lunch".

The drink is also featured in the 2007 Mad Men season one episode "Nixon v. Kennedy", set in 1960. The episode features stingers made with Bacardi rum, as Bacardi was a series sponsor.

Women in Lawrence Block novels sometimes drink stingers. In The Burglar Who Dropped In On Elvis Bernie's date "had two dry Rob Roys first, most of the dinner wine, and a stinger afterward. I had a Bloody Mary for openers, and my after-dinner drink was a cup of coffee. I felt like a cheap date." And in The Burglar in the Closet, "Frankie's drinking, on the other hand, was certainly serious enough to keep the Recovery Room anchored in grim reality. A stinger is always a reasonably serious proposition. A brace of stingers at four o'clock on a weekday afternoon is about as serious as you can get."

The stinger was widely mentioned in American motion pictures. Dudley the angel (played by Cary Grant) orders a round of stingers while lunching with ladies from the church in the 1947 film The Bishop's Wife. The evolving stinger (used with green rather than white crème de menthe) forms a plot point in the 1948 film The Big Clock, when George Stroud (Ray Milland) orders one and a random woman in the bar (Rita Johnson) already knows his name. In the 1950 Humphrey Bogart and Gloria Grahame film In a Lonely Place, Dix Steele's lush friend Charlie orders a stinger at Paul's bar before the first fight scene. In the 1956 Bing Crosby and Frank Sinatra film High Society, Dexter-Haven's butler offers Stingers at lunch to those who over-indulged in champagne during the previous evening's party. Cary Grant again orders stingers ("and keep them coming") as he tries to tolerate character Alice Kratzner's (Jayne Mansfield) empty-headed babbling in the 1957 comedy film Kiss Them for Me. Mr. Dobitsch (Ray Walston) instructs his Marilyn Monroe look-alike date (Joyce Jameson) in the 1960 film The Apartment to not spill the glasses of stingers she is holding as they exit their cab and enter C.C. Baxter's (Jack Lemmon) apartment at night for a tryst. In the 1975 Warren Beatty film Shampoo, at the Republican Party dinner scene Goldie Hawn says, "I'll have a stinger", to which Tony Bill replies, "Before dinner?"

== See also ==
- List of cocktails

== Bibliography ==
- The Art of Mixology. New york: Parragon Books. 2015. ISBN 9781472398901.
- Calabrese, Salvatore (2015). Classic Cocktails. New York: Sterling Epicure. ISBN 9781402786280.
- Chirico, Rob (2005). Field Guide to Cocktails: How to Identify and Prepare Virtually Every Mixed Drink at the Bar. Philadelphia: Quirk Books. ISBN 9781594740633.
- DeGroff, Dale (2008). The Essential Cocktail: The Art of Mixing Perfect Drinks. New York: Clarkson Potter. ISBN 9780307405739.
- Gelman, Judy; Zheutlin, Peter (2011). The Unofficial 'Mad Men' Cookbook: Inside the Kitchens, Bars, and Restaurants of 'Mad Men'. Dallas: Smart Pop. ISBN 9781936661411.
- Hellmich, Mittie (2006). Ultimate Bar Book: The Comprehensive Guide to Over 1,000 Cocktails. San Francisco: Chronicle Books. ISBN 9780811843515.
- Holloway, Diane E. (2002). Authors' Famous Recipes and Reflections on Food. San Jose, Calif.: Writers Club Press. ISBN 0595243797.
- Kelly, Clinton (2008). Freakin' Fabulous: How to Dress, Speak, Behave, Eat, Drink, Entertain, Decorate, and Generally Be Better Than Everyone Else. New York: Simon and Schuster. ISBN 9781416961499.
- Kingwell, Mark (2007). Classic Cocktails: A Modern Shake. New York: St. Martin's Press. ISBN 9780312375232.
- McCammon, Ross; Wondrich, David (2016). Drink Like a Man: The Only Cocktail Guide Anyone Really Needs. San Francisco: Chronicle Books. ISBN 9781452132709.
- Rathbun, A.J. (2007). Good Spirits: Recipes, Revelations, Refreshments, and Romance, Shaken and Served With a Twist. Boston: Harvard Common Press. ISBN 9781558323360.
- Regan, Gary (2003). The Joy of Mixology. New York: Clarkson Potter. ISBN 9780609608845.
- Rombauer, Irma S.; Becker, Marion Rombauer; Becker, Ethan (2002). All About Party Foods and Drinks. New York: Simon & Schuster. ISBN 9780743216791.
- Said, Oliver; Mellgren, James (2005). The Bar: A Spirited Guide to Cocktail Alchemy. Ten Speed Press. ISBN 9781580086820.
- Sandham, Tom (2012). World's Best Cocktails: 500 Signature Drinks From the World's Best Bars and Bartenders. Beverly, Mass.: Fair Winds press. ISBN 9781592335275.
- Shaw, Tucker (2008). A Man's Place Is Behind the Bar: Killer Cocktail Recipes. San Francisco: Chronicle Books. ISBN 9780811855778.
- Walker, Michael (1980). The Cocktail Book: The Complete Guide to Home Cocktails. Tucson: HP Books. ISBN 9780895860699.
- Wohl, Kit (2012). New Orleans Classic Cocktails: Spirited Recipes. Gretna, La.: Pelican Publishing. ISBN 9781455617289.
- Wondrich, David (2015). Imbibe!: From Absinthe Cocktail to Whiskey Smash, A Salute in Stories and Drinks to "Professor" Jerry Thomas, Pioneer of the American Bar. New York: Perigee. ISBN 9780399172618.
