= Bache-Gabrielsen =

Brand of cognac

- Founded: 1905
- Founder: Thomas Bache-Gabrielsen
- Key people: Hervé Bache-Gabrielsen
- Products: Cognac

Bache-Gabrielsen is a brand of cognac. It is a medium size fourth generation family company that is present both on the Scandinavian markets and elsewhere. Today, it is the top selling cognac in Norway, selling over one million bottles annually.

Bache-Gabrielsen’s cognacs are popular in Norway and has a large and active fan club.

== History ==
In 1903, the 20 year old Norwegian Lieutenant from Holmestrand, Norway, Thomas Bache-Gabrielsen, left the army and traveled to the city of Cognac in order to acquire some practical working experience to take over one day his father's fine wine & spirit store.

Following his arrival in France, Thomas Bache-Gabrielsen partnered with Peter Anton Rustad to purchase the company Dupuy, a local cognac house established since 1852. In 1905, they founded their own cognac house under the name Rustad & Bache-Gabrielsen, in addition to the existing name Dupuy. Their connections with Scandinavia were extremely good which allowed them to acquire there their first stable markets.

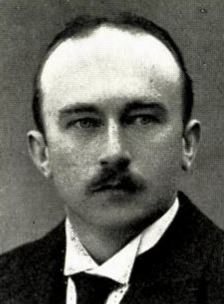
Thomas Bache-Gabrielsen

In 1906, Thomas settled in Cognac for good when he married Miss Odette Villard. With their marriage and the new business, any plans to return permanently to Norway were abandoned. The couple had three sons, René, who took over the running of the company, Eric, who became a lawyer, and Guy, who became a doctor. Thomas remained a Norwegian citizen and was often called home to undertake refresher military service. He also maintained contact with his Norwegian family.

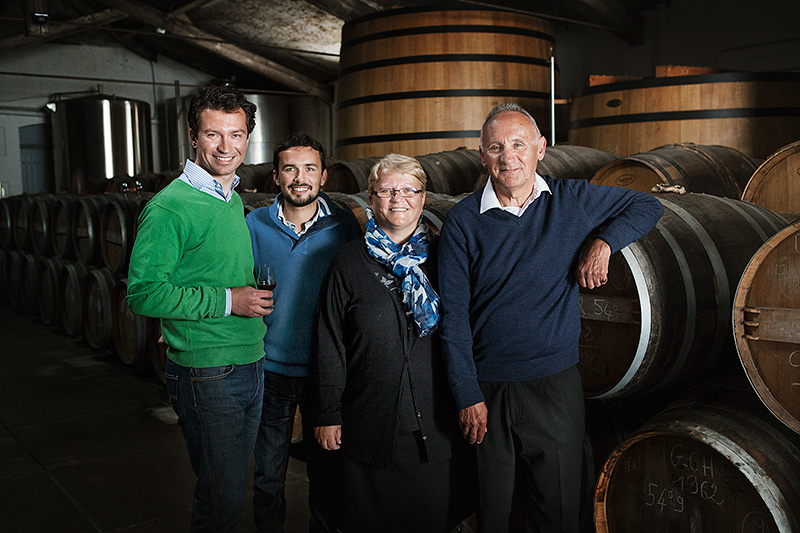
Part of the Bache-Gabrielsen family. From left to right: Hervé, François, Sylvie, Christian

In 1930, René, the eldest son of Thomas Bache-Gabrielsen and his wife Odette joined the company. He became the head of Bache-Gabrielsen cognac in 1942. In 1968, Christian Bache-Gabrielsen, grandson of Thomas entered the business and became general manager in 1985.

While growing in size, the company Bache-Gabrielsen also developed its own identity during this period by hiring in 1991 Jean-Philippe Bergier as Maitre de Chai (Cellar Master). Jean-Philippe Bergier has since expressed his art as the “Nez” of Bache-Gabrielsen and given an authentic and singular identity to Bache-Gabrielsen cognacs.

In 2009, Hervé Bache-Gabrielsen, 4th generation of the family officially became the general manager of the company. This period also marks the beginning of a new era of expansion for the brand outside of its traditional Scandinavian market. In 2012, Bache-Gabrielsen opened an office in Hong Kong to develop its Asian activities. In 2016, it launched its Natur & Eleganse line on the American market.

The brand Dupuy is still owned by the Bache-Gabrielsen family.

== Product line ==
Bache-Gabrielsen Cognac lines are divided between classical, Natur & Eleganse line and the range "DistillationS" :

== Fan clubs ==
Bache-Gabrielsen has numerous fan clubs essentially in Northern Europe:

| Norway | Sweden |
|---|---|
| Bergen; Fredrikstad; Holmestrand; Kongsvinger; Kristiansand; Kristiansund; Lillehammer; Molde; Narvik; Oslo; Vest-Telemark; Ålesund | Stockholm; Malmø – ÖlandLund |
