= La Fontaine de La Pouyade Cognac =

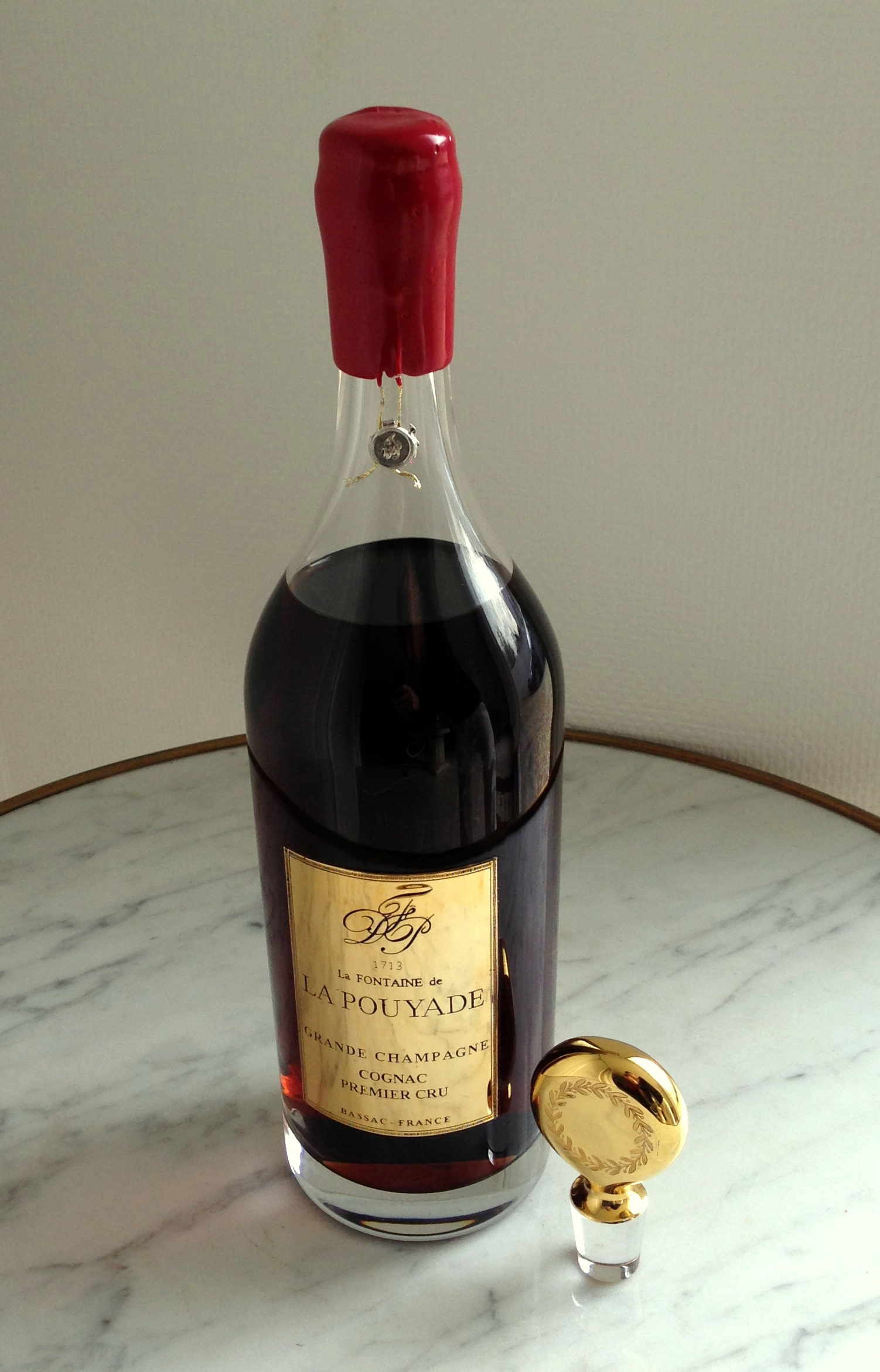
La Fontaine de La Pouyade Baccarat Decanter

La Fontaine de la Pouyade is a Cognac coming exclusively from the Grande Champagne, legally classified as the 1st Cru of the limited Cognac Region.

The Brand is owned by Maison Dubosquet which is run by Bernard Bouyer-Dubosquet, the 14th generation of Cognac producers.

== Products ==
La Fontaine de La Pouyade Antique Bottle

La Fontaine de La Pouyade Baccarat Decanter
