= Harry Johnson (bartender) =

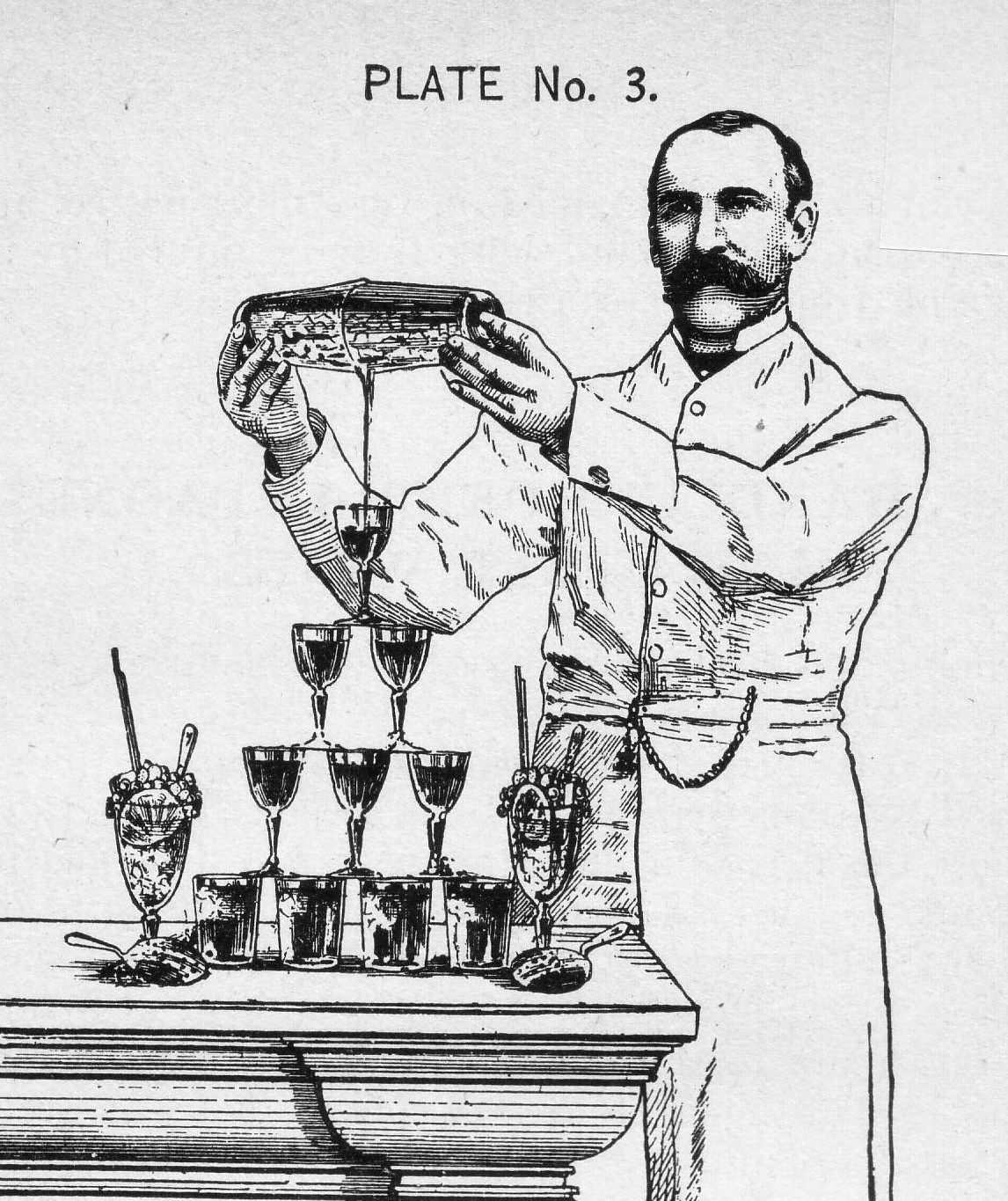
- Harry Johnson in New and Improved Bartenders' Manual
- Born: Prussia
- Occupation: bartender

Harry Johnson was an American bartender who owned and operated saloons across the US in the late 19th century and the early 20th century. He is best known for the New and Improved Bartenders' Manual, an influential book that contained many original cocktail recipes, as well as the first written recipes of such cocktails as the marguerite and a version of the martini. Perhaps even more importantly, it was the first book to offer bar management instructions. Johnson opened the first ever consulting agency for bar management. Imbibe magazine has called him one of the most influential cocktail personalities of the last 100 years, and he has been called "the father of professional bartending".

== Life and work ==
Johnson was born in Prussia. A sailor, he was left by his ship in San Francisco in 1861 to recover from a broken arm and hip. Starting as a kitchen-boy in the Union Hotel, he worked his way up to bartender and then manager. It was in San Francisco that he first met Jerry Thomas, his rival, whose work he would continue.

After eight years, Johnson moved to Chicago and opened a bar of his own, which became very successful. Now a celebrity, Johnson gave lectures and wrote articles and recipes for local newspapers. In 1869, he claimed that he had challenged the five best American bartenders in New Orleans and won, becoming "the champion of the United States." No other source confirms this, though. When his bar burned in the Great Chicago Fire in 1871, Johnson went to New York City. In 1877, he bought Little Jumbo, a bar where Thomas used to work. Upon hearing that, Thomas publicly renounced any association with the bar. Their rivalry peaked in 1880, when Thomas threw a bowl of Tom and Jerry on the floor of Johnson's bar, calling him an amateur because that drink should only be served when the temperature drops below zero.

In 1890, Johnson decided to retire from bartending and opened a bar management consulting agency, thereby becoming the first bar consultant in history.

=== New and Improved Bartender's Manual ===
His New and Improved Bartender's Manual, or How to Mix Drinks in the Present Style was published in 1882. The manual provided hundreds of cocktail recipes. However, what made it seminal were its detailed instructions on how to become a proper bartender, such as: "The opening of a new place", "How ale and porter should be drawn", "Hints about training a boy to the business", "Handing bar-spoons to customers", "To keep ants and other insects out of mixing bottles" etc.

The book contained the first written recipes of such cocktails as the bijou (invented by Johnson), the marguerite (in the 1900 edition), and a version of the martini (in the 1888 edition). The invention of the martini was sometimes wrongly attributed to him – or to Thomas.

Johnson claimed to have written and published an earlier edition, in 1860. If true, it would be the first cocktail guide ever published, pre-dating Thomas's The Bar-Tender's Guide by two years. However, no copies of the book have been found.
