= Grasshopper (cocktail) =

Sweet, mint-flavored, after-dinner drink

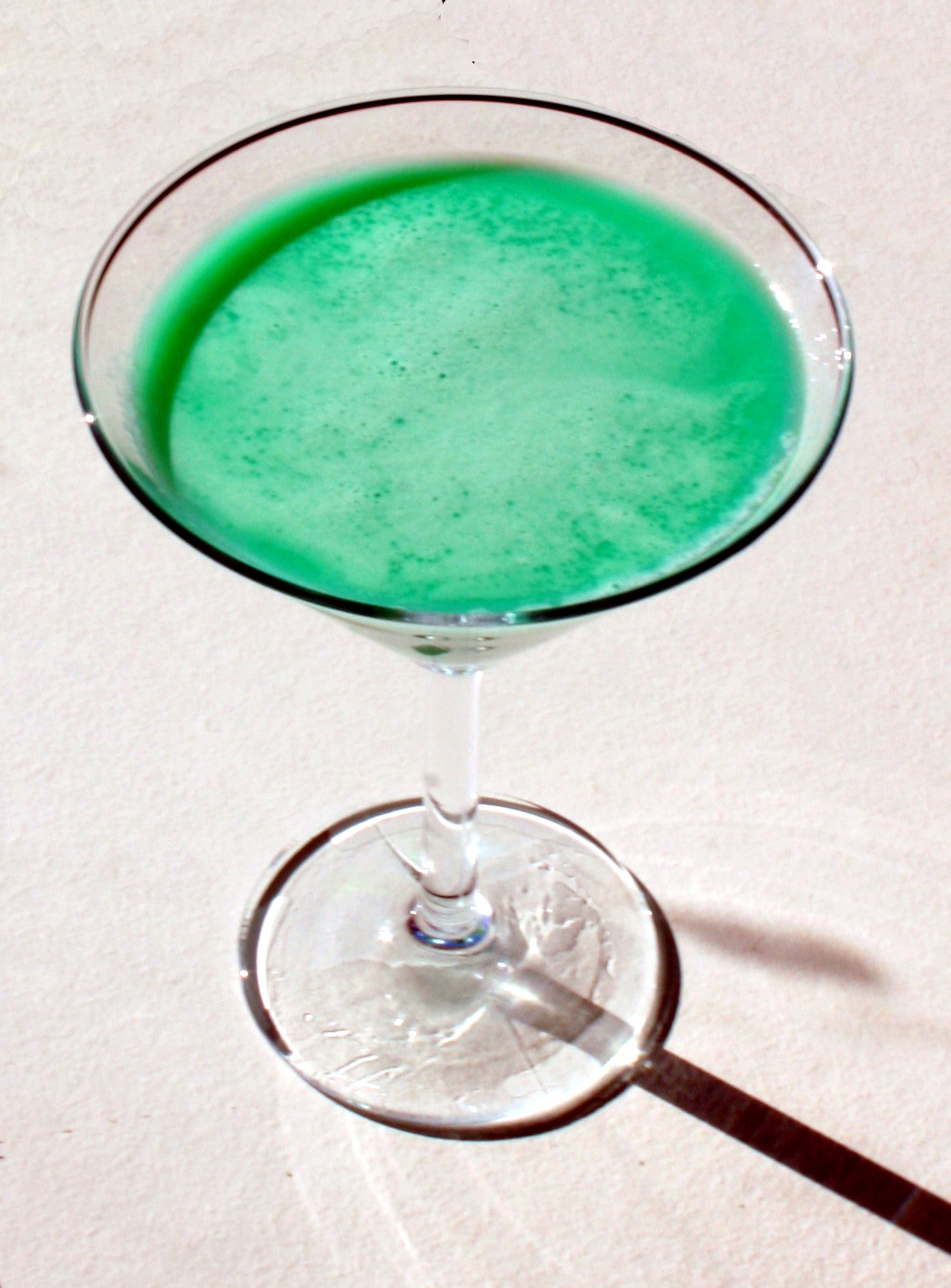
- Type: Cocktail
- Ingredients: 3 cl crème de menthe (green); 3 cl crème de cacao (white); 3 cl cream
- Base spirit: Crème de cacao, Crème de menthe
- Standard drinkware: Cocktail glass
- Served: Straight up: chilled, without ice
- Preparation: Pour ingredients into a cocktail shaker with ice. Shake briskly and then strain into a chilled cocktail glass.

A grasshopper is a sweet, mint-flavored, after-dinner alcoholic drink named for its green color, which comes from crème de menthe. Tujague's, a bar in the French Quarter of New Orleans, Louisiana, claims its owner Philip Guichet invented the drink in 1918. The drink gained popularity during the 1950s and 1960s throughout the American South.

== Composition ==
A typical grasshopper cocktail is equal parts green crème de menthe, white crème de cacao and cream, shaken with ice and strained into a chilled cocktail glass.

=== Variations ===
A "vodka" or "flying" grasshopper replaces the cream with vodka.

A "frozen" grasshopper adds mint ice cream to create a more dessert-like drink.

An "after eight" adds a layer of dark chocolate liqueur to the crème de menthe, crème de cacao and cream.

In the North Central United States, especially Wisconsin, grasshoppers are blended drinks, with ice cream substituted for cream. A related variation is the "grasshopper milkshake", which contains mint chocolate chip ice cream, milk, and crème de menthe. This is blended and served in a tall glass decorated with a miniature or broken cream-filled chocolate sandwich cookie.

A "Girl Scout Cookie" substitutes peppermint schnapps for crème de menthe.

In celebrating the 85th anniversary of the snack food, Hostess released a cooking book of recipes using Twinkies. One of the recipes is called a "Twinkie grasshopper" which is akin to a milkshake.

== See also ==
- List of cocktails
