= Alexander (cocktail) =

Cocktail of cognac, chocolate liqueur and cream

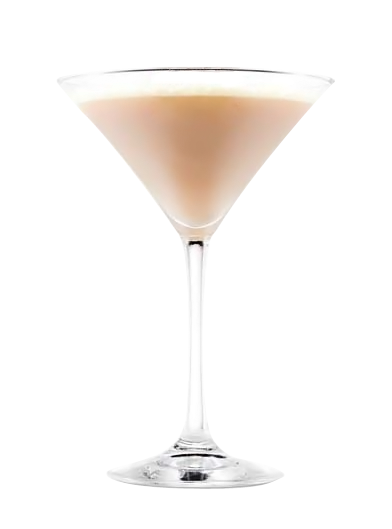
- Type: Cocktail
- Ingredients: 30 ml cognac; 30 ml crème de cacao (brown); 30 ml fresh cream
- Website: iba-world.com/iba-cocktails/
- Standard drinkware: Cocktail glass
- Standard garnish: nutmeg
- Served: Straight up: chilled, without ice
- Preparation: Pour all ingredients into cocktail shaker filled with ice cubes. Shake and strain into a chilled cocktail glass.

The Alexander is a cocktail consisting of cognac, crème de cacao, and cream. It dates from the early 20th century. It was originally made with gin, but the modern version is made with brandy and is called a Brandy Alexander.

== History ==
There are at least two drinks from the early 20th century, which were known by the name 'Alexander', but which are nevertheless different drinks. In Jack's Manual on The Vintage & Production, Care & Handling of Wines, Liquors &c. (1910) by Jacob Abraham Grohusko, the 'Alexander Cocktail' is described as three parts rye whiskey, one part Bénédictine, with a piece of ice and a twist of orange peel. In Recipes for Mixed Drinks (1915) by Hugo Ensslin, a drink by the same name is made with equal parts of gin, white crème de cacao and sweet cream, shaken with ice, and strained.

The Alexander was originally made with gin, but the modern version is usually made with brandy and is called a Brandy Alexander. The International Bartenders Association calls for brandy in its Alexander.

== Variations ==
The Coffee Alexander substitutes coffee liqueur (such as Kahlúa) for crème de cacao. The Blue Alexander substitutes blue Curaçao for crème de cacao. The Brandy Alexander substitutes gin for some form of brandy, other variations also exist.

The Blonde Negress, from Paris, is made with 2 parts gin, 2 parts cognac, 1 part Creme de Cacao and 1 part sweet cream.

== See also ==
- List of cocktails
- List of IBA official cocktails
