= Moyet =

Cognac brand

Moyet is a brand of cognac and a company. The Moyet house was founded in 1864 by Euthrope Moyet, a vine grower and a distiller. An unusual aspect of the history of Moyet is that it has had only three cellar masters since it was founded in 1864, with the founder working until 1918 and the founder's apprentice working until 1978. This continuity is said to give the house a unique philosophy and style, particularly with regard to maintaining the very highest traditional standards.

Cognac Moyet is served on several airlines, including SAS.

Cognac Moyet is situated in Cognac, France.
