= Mozart Distillerie =

Austrian maker of chocolate liqueurs

The liqueurs made by the Mozart Distillerie

Mozart Distillerie GmbH (established 1954) of Salzburg, Austria, is a maker of chocolate liqueurs.

== Branding ==
The firm has successfully developed a brand based around Wolfgang Amadeus Mozart, who was born in Salzburg, which emphasises the blending of different elements that make up a liqueur in a similar way to the different parts of a work of music.

Distinctive packaging has been developed using short, round, shiny, foil-covered bottles that contrast with the tall bottles often used for alcoholic beverages and enable the liqueur to be double-stacked on the shelf in a retail outlet, allowing more product to be displayed in the same shelf space.

== Investors ==
In 2008, Suntory Limited, part of the Suntory Group, acquired 50% of Mozart Distillerie GmbH from Bevipar AG, König Vermögens-Verwaltungs- Gesellschaft mbH and Dkfm Harald König in order to expand its portfolio of premium alcoholic beverage brands. Suntory had imported Mozart Distillerie products into Japan since 1990 under an agency contract with the Austrian company. It has partnerships with more than 40 companies and uses its powerful distribution network to sell more than 70 brands of western spirits into "emerging" markets like India and China. The deal allowed Mozart Distillerie to expand its sales outside the European market.

== Products ==
Mozart Distillerie produces a wide range of chocolate liqueurs, including Mozart Gold Chocolate Cream, Mozart White Chocolate Cream, Mozart Black Dark, Mozart Dry Chocolate Spirit and most recently in 2013, Mozart R.G. Chocolate Cream.

== See also ==
- Mozartkugel
