= Liqueur Fogg =

Brazilian liqueur

Liqueur Fogg is a Brazilian cocoa-flavoured liqueur, manufactured in Gramado, Rio Grande do Sul. It has used substantially the same recipe since its inception in 1930.
