= Crème de menthe =

Sweet, mint-flavored alcoholic beverage

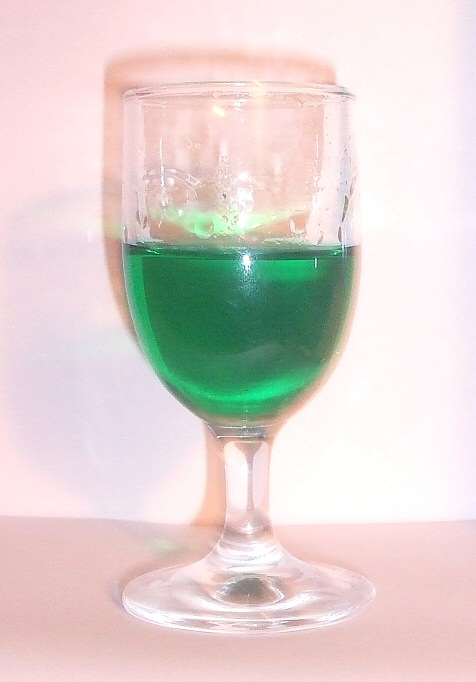

Crème de menthe (pronounced [kʁɛm də mɑ̃t], French for "mint cream") is a sweet, mint-flavored alcoholic beverage. It is available commercially in a colorless version (called "white") and a green version (colored by the mint leaves or by added coloring if made from extract instead of leaves). Both varieties have similar flavor and are interchangeable in recipes outside of the color aesthetics. It is usually made with Corsican mint or peppermint, steeped in grain alcohol for several weeks before being filtered and sweetened to create the final product. It typically has 25% alcohol by volume.

Crème de menthe is an ingredient in several cocktails, such as the Grasshopper and the Stinger. It is also served as a digestif and used in cooking as a flavoring (see mint chocolate). It is also a primary component of the popular South African shooter known as the Springbokkie.

== Music ==
Russian composer and conductor Sergei Rachmaninoff, although nominally abstinent from alcohol, found that a glass of crème de menthe steadied his nerves before playing the technically demanding piano score in the twenty-fourth variation of his Rhapsody on a Theme of Paganini. He nicknamed the twenty-fourth the "Crème de Menthe Variation".

== Menta ==
Menta is a sweet mint liqueur prepared from natural ingredients like spearmint oil. It is a refreshing drink popular in Bulgaria in the summertime. It is a component of some cocktails, such as the traditional "Cloud" (in Bulgarian: Облак), where it is combined with Mastika. It is a sweet mint liqueur (typically 15-25% ABV) derived from a distillate of mint leaves & is available to buy as bottles of either green or white (clear) liquid.

== See also ==
- Armenian cuisine
