= Chocolate liqueur =

Alcoholic drink with chocolate flavoring

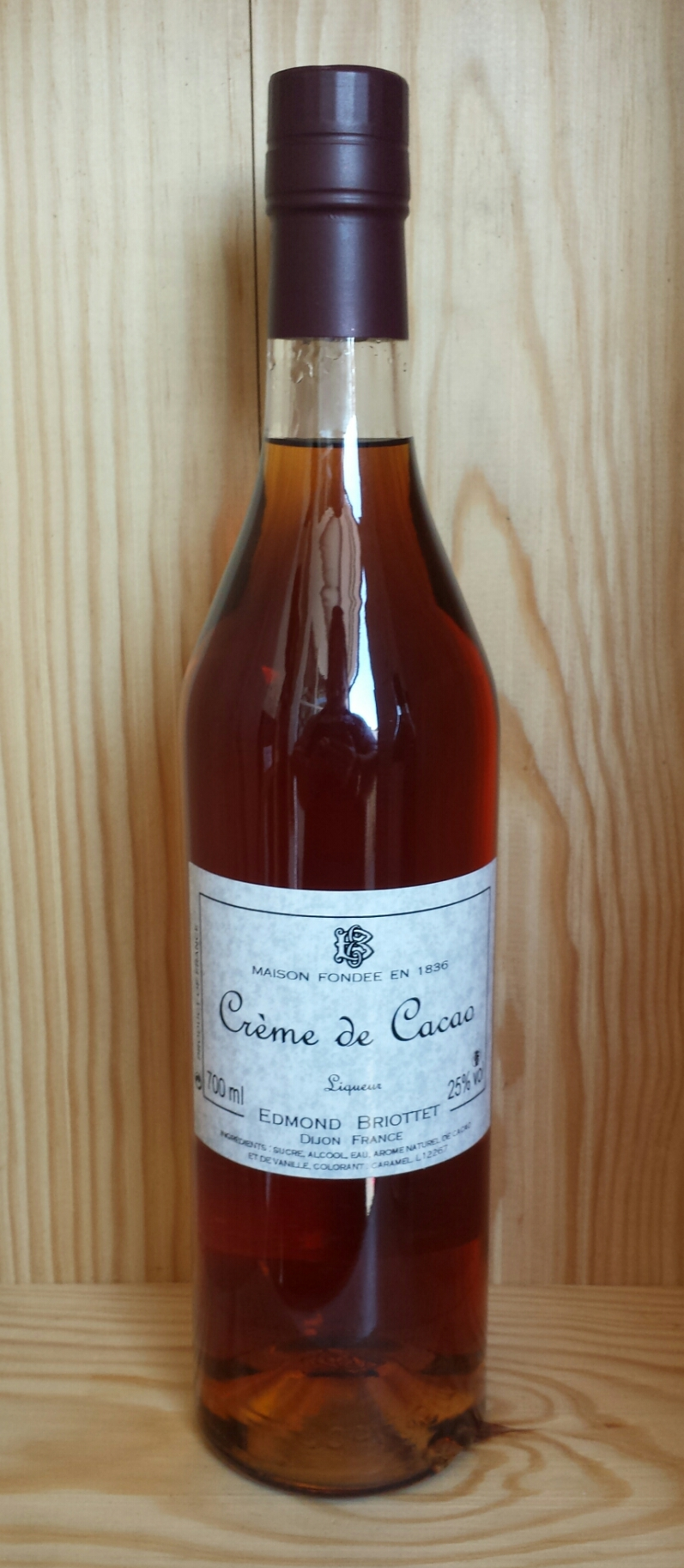
- A bottle of crème de cacao

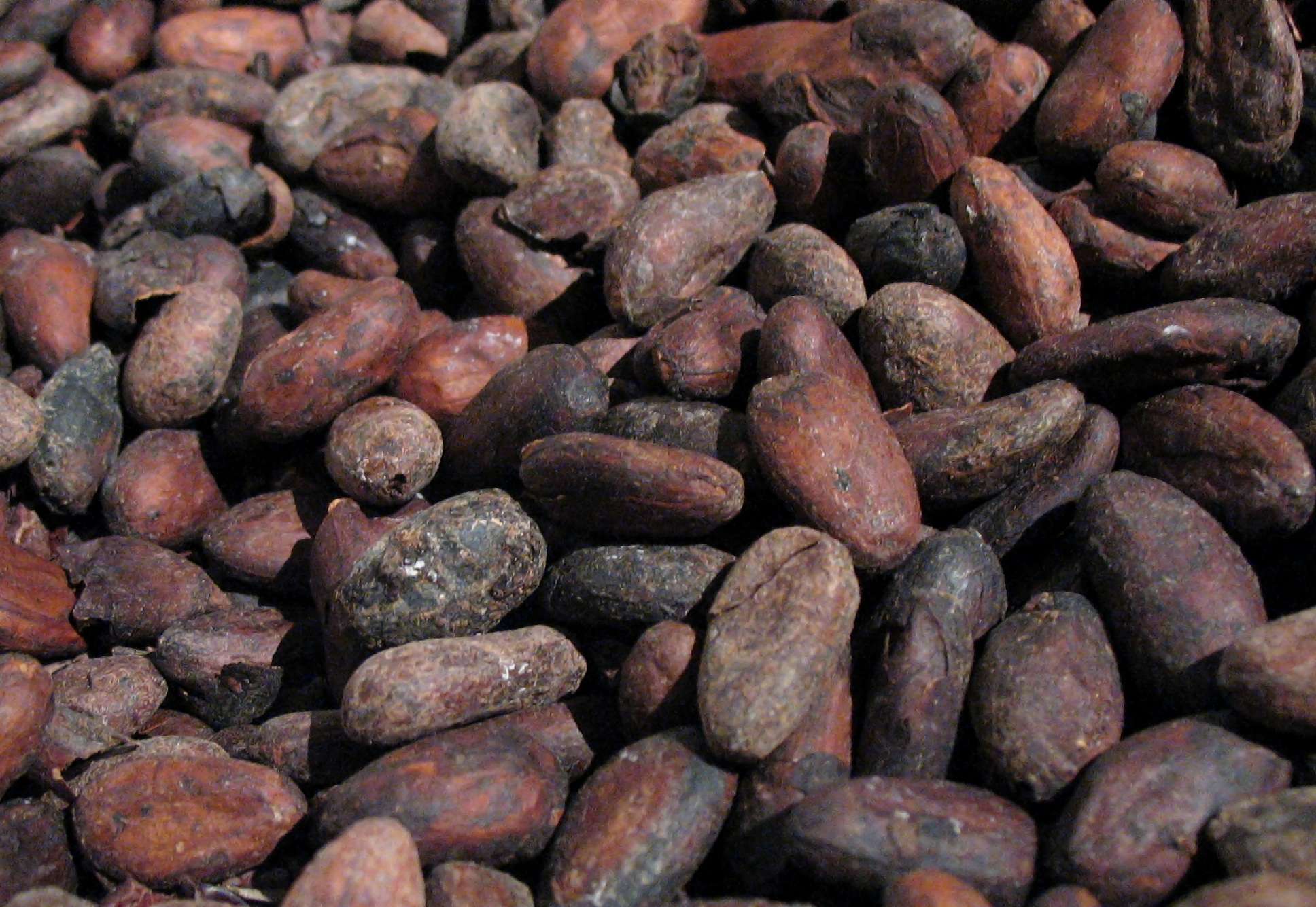
Cacao beans

Chocolate liqueur is a chocolate-flavored liqueur made from a base liquor of whisky or vodka. Unlike chocolate liquor, chocolate liqueur contains alcohol. Chocolate liqueur is often used as an ingredient in mixology, baking, and cooking.

== History ==
There is mention in contemporary sources of chocolate en liqueur being produced as early as 1666. Context suggests this is a chocolate liqueur, not a chocolate liquor or cocoa bean extract nor any other chocolate flavored beverage.

In New England prior to the 18th century American Revolution, a "chocolate wine" was popular. Its ingredients included sherry, port, chocolate, and sugar. A French manual published in 1780 also describes chocolate liqueur. An 1803 French pharmacy manual includes a recipe for a chocolate liqueur (ratafia de chocolat, also ratafia de cacao). An early 19th-century American cookbook, published in 1825 and preserved in an historical archive in South Carolina, includes a similar recipe. Throughout the 19th century and into the early 20th century, manuals and encyclopedias in French, English, and Spanish give similar recipes. A late 19th century food science manual gives a recipe that includes techniques for clarifying and coloring the liqueur. A similar early 20th century manual gives four recipes.

== Recipes ==
Early 19th century recipes for chocolate liqueur featured whole cocoa beans. A basic modern recipe for making chocolate liqueur at home lists the ingredients chocolate extract, vanilla extract, vodka, and simple syrup. To keep the chocolate extract in suspension and make the liqueur thicker, glycerine may be added. In its purest form, chocolate liqueur is clear; coloring may be added. Recipes for home-made chocolate liqueurs may also include raw eggs as an ingredient, presenting a risk of salmonellosis. Reasonable safety may be achieved by combining the eggs with the alcohol before other ingredients. Earlier, liquor was made by adding the cocoa beans to classic liqueur. Modern chocolate wine can be considered as a subspecies of chocolate liqueur.

== Uses ==
Chocolate liqueur can be consumed straight, as an after dinner drink rather than as aperitif. It is used in mixed drinks and in desserts, especially in dessert sauces, cakes, and truffles. Food writer Shirley Corriher notes that many recipes for chocolate truffle add a small amount of chocolate liqueur to melted chocolate, and warns that adding the liqueur often causes the chocolate to seize. One of the more unusual uses is in chocolate rolled fondant.

Arguably the most controversial use may be in connection with a scandal concerning the provenance of certain 17th century bottles of wines said to have belonged to Thomas Jefferson, and traded by Hardy Rodenstock. Benjamin Wallace writes in his book The Billionaire's Vinegar that at a wine tasting of 19th century wines from Château Latour, provided by Rodenstock, several people noted the wines had a flavor of chocolate liqueur and were fakes. Wine and chocolate are a classic flavor pairing, and this is reflected in some cocktails that combine a strong red wine with a dash of chocolate liqueur.

== Varieties ==
There are three types of chocolate liqueur: liqueur, cream liqueur, and crème de cacao.

=== Chocolate liqueur ===
- Afrikoko (coconut and chocolate)
- Ashanti Gold
- Bicerin Di Giandujotto (chocolate and hazelnut)
- Godiva Dark Chocolate
- Intramuros Liqueur de Cacao
- Liqueur Fogg
- Mozart Black (dark chocolate)
- OM Dark Chocolate & Sea Salt Liqueur
- Royal Mint-Chocolate Liqueur (French)
- Sabra liqueur (dark chocolate and Jaffa oranges)
- Thornton's Chocolate Liqueur
- Mon Chéri

=== Chocolate cream liqueur ===
- Cadbury Cream Liqueur
- Dooley's White Chocolate Cream Liqueur
- Dorda Double Chocolate Liqueur
- Dwersteg's Organic Chocolate Cream Liqueur
- Godiva White Chocolate
- Hotel Chocolat Velvetised Chocolate Cream
- Florcello Chocolate Orange Cream Liqueur
- Mozart Gold Chocolate Cream Liqueur
- Mozart White Chocolate Cream Liqueur
- Vana Tallinn Chocolate Cream
- Vermeer Dutch Chocolate Cream Liqueur

=== Crème de cacao ===
Crème de cacao may be either clear or a dark caramel color, which is often labeled dark crème de cacao. The French word crème identifies it as a crème liqueur, a liqueur with a high sugar content as stipulated by various regulations (for example, European law requires a sugar content of 250 g/L). There is no dairy cream in it.

White crème de cacao is a clear, sweet liqueur that has a clearer and a more delicate chocolate flavor than the darker variant. The difference lies majorly on the production methods and coloring: white crème de cacao is flavored with distillate cacao beans while the dark version is gotten by retaining the natural coloring of the cacao beans. Vanilla is commonly added to enhance aroma and sweetness.

The alcohol content of crème de cacao varies, but 20–25% ABV (40–50 proof (U.S.)) is common.

== See also ==
- List of chocolate drinks
