= Ängsholmen =

Ängsholmen may refer to:

- Ängsholmen, Eskilstuna Municipality, a place in Eskilstuna Municipality, Södermanland County, Sweden
- Ängsholmen, Lidingö, an island of the Fjäderholmarna group in Lidingö Municipality, Stockholm County, Sweden
- Ängsholmen, Vindö NE, an island to the north-east of Vindö in Värmdö Municipality, Stockholm County, Sweden
- Ängsholmen, Vindö NW, an island to the north-west of Vindö in Värmdö Municipality, Stockholm County, Sweden
