= Mackmyra Whisky =

Swedish whisky distillery

Coordinates: 60.63971°N 16.96541°E

Mackmyra Svensk Whisky AB
- Type: Aktiebolag
- Traded as: First North: MACK B
- Industry: Manufacturing and distillation of liquors
- Founded: Sweden (1998)
- Defunct: August 19, 2024
- Products: Distilled and blended liquors
- Revenue: ▼SEK 64.302 million million (2013)
- Total assets: ▼SEK 350.625 million (2013)
- Total equity: ▼SEK 148.621 million (2013)
- Number of employees: 53 (2013)
- Website: mackmyra.com

Mackmyra distillery
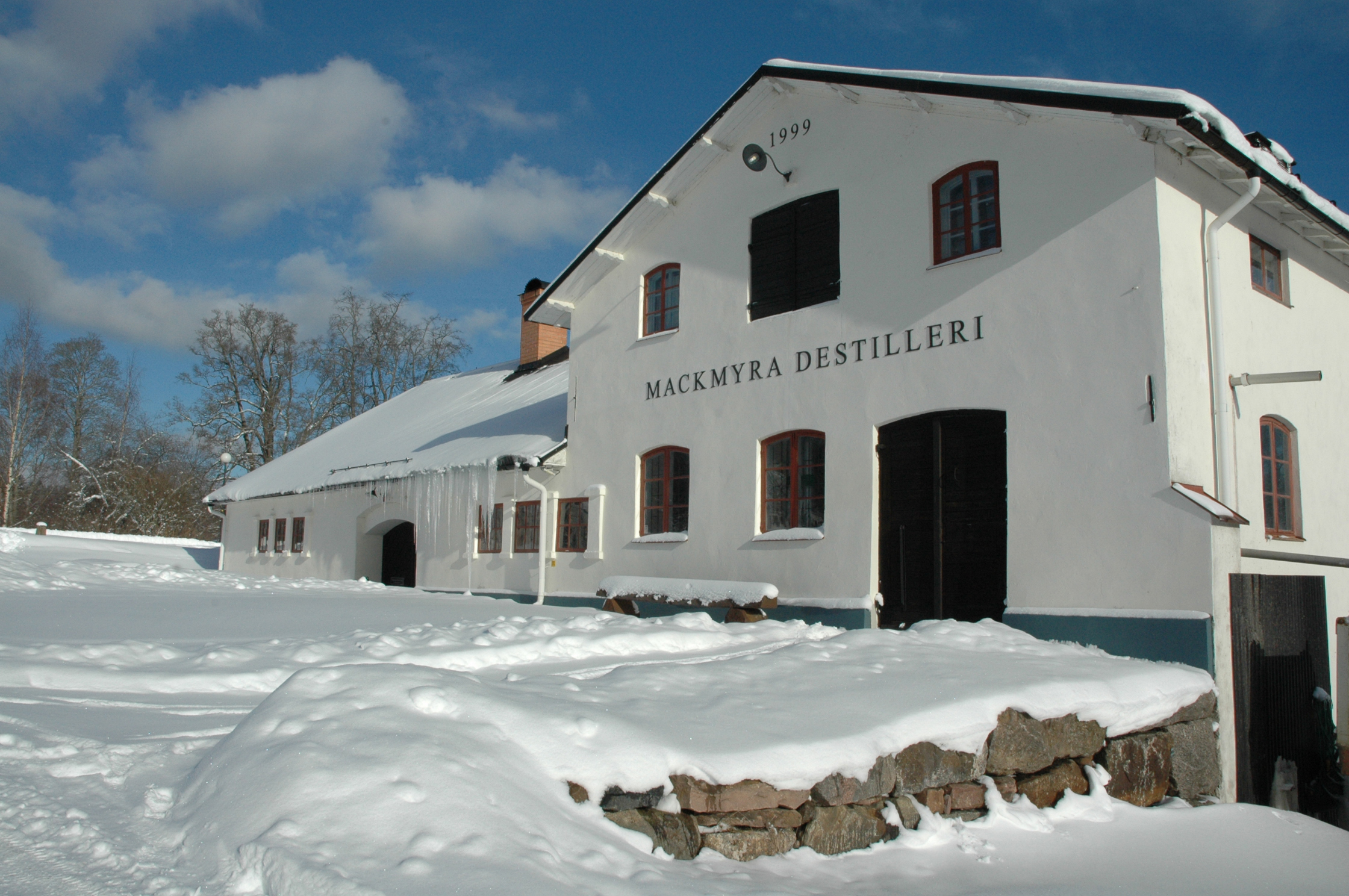
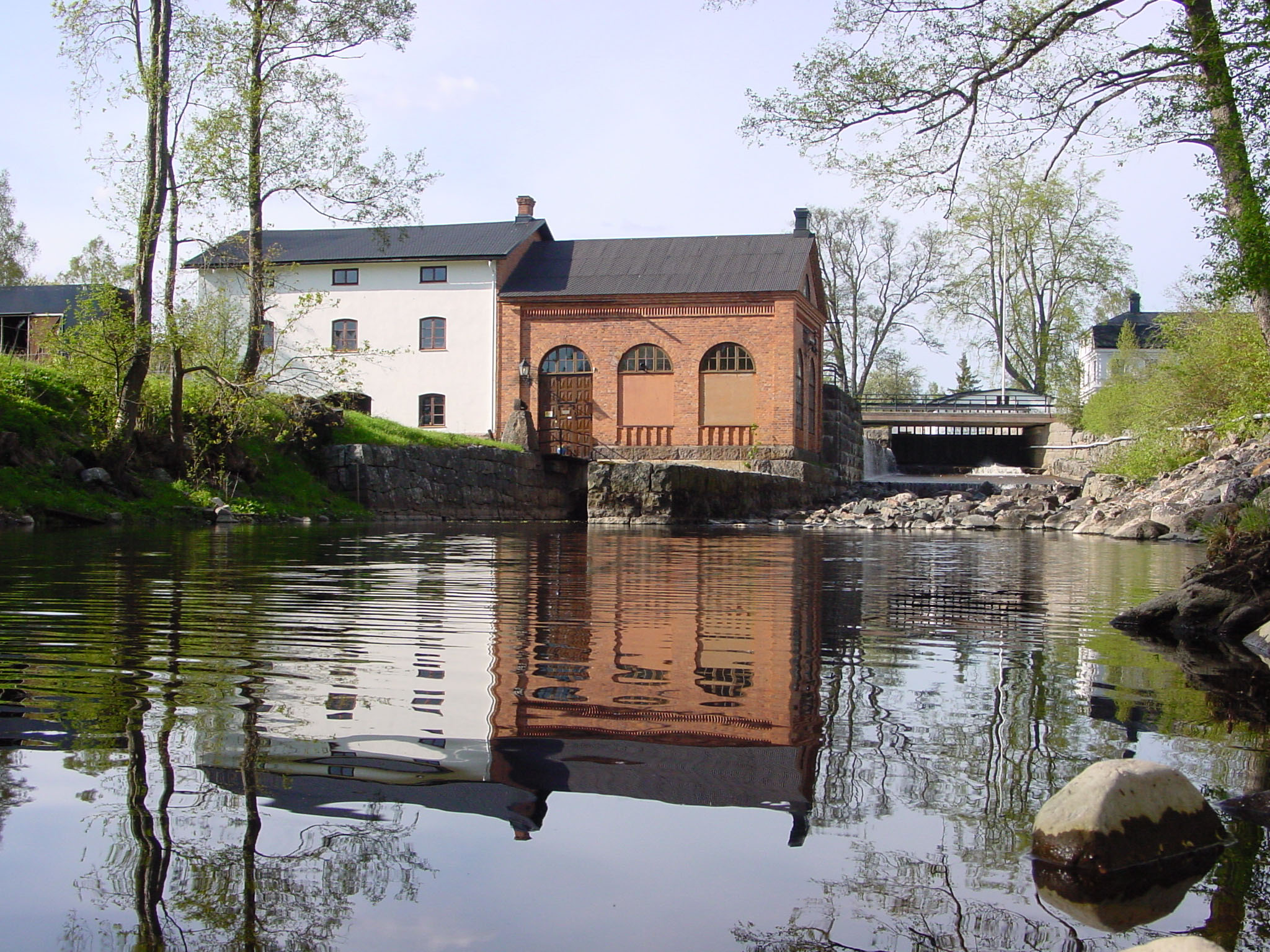

Mackmyra Whisky is a Swedish Single malt whisky distillery. On 19 August 2024, Mackmyra Svensk Whisky AB filed for bankruptcy. After the bankruptcy, more than 50 organizations expressed interest to buy Mackmyra, such interest level is unprecedented in Swedish history.

It is named after the village and manor of Mackmyra, where the first distillery was established, in the residential district of Valbo, south-west of Gävle. The toponym is commonly suggested as deriving from a regional word for gnats (Swedish: mack) and mire (Swedish: myr). However, owlet moths have all but disappeared from present-day Mackmyra, due to the gradual rebound of land—a result of the melting of ice sheets 10,000 years ago.

Mackmyra Svensk Whisky AB is a publicly traded company, listed in December 2011 on Nasdaq OMX's alternative-investment market First North. The company has about 45 employees with annual revenues of around SEK 100 million, and its biggest shareholder is the Swedish farmer's co-op Lantmännen.

== History ==
Mackmyra's history started in 1998 at a Swedish winter resort, where eight friends from the Royal Institute of Technology met up for a ski trip. Noticing all of them had brought along a bottle of malt whisky for the host, a conversation started about the manufacturing of a Swedish whisky. The following year a company was founded, and after years of experimenting with 170 different recipes, they finally settled on two recipes in 2002. That same year a new distillery was built in the old mill and power station at Mackmyra, which went on stream in October. The first limited-edition single malt whisky, Preludium 01, launched in February 2006 and sold-out in less than 20 minutes.

== Production ==
Mackmyra warehouses

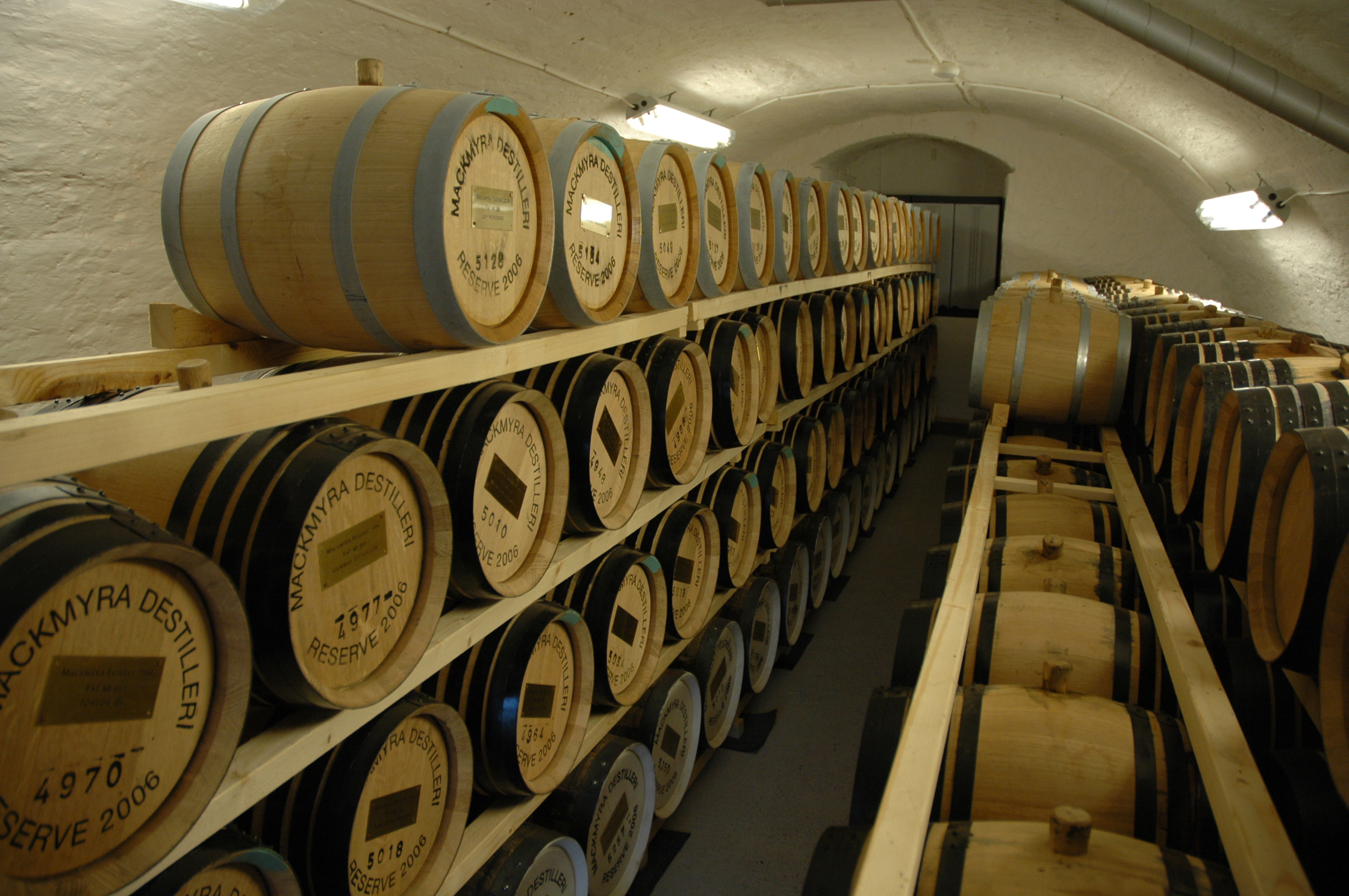
At Hackeberga Castle

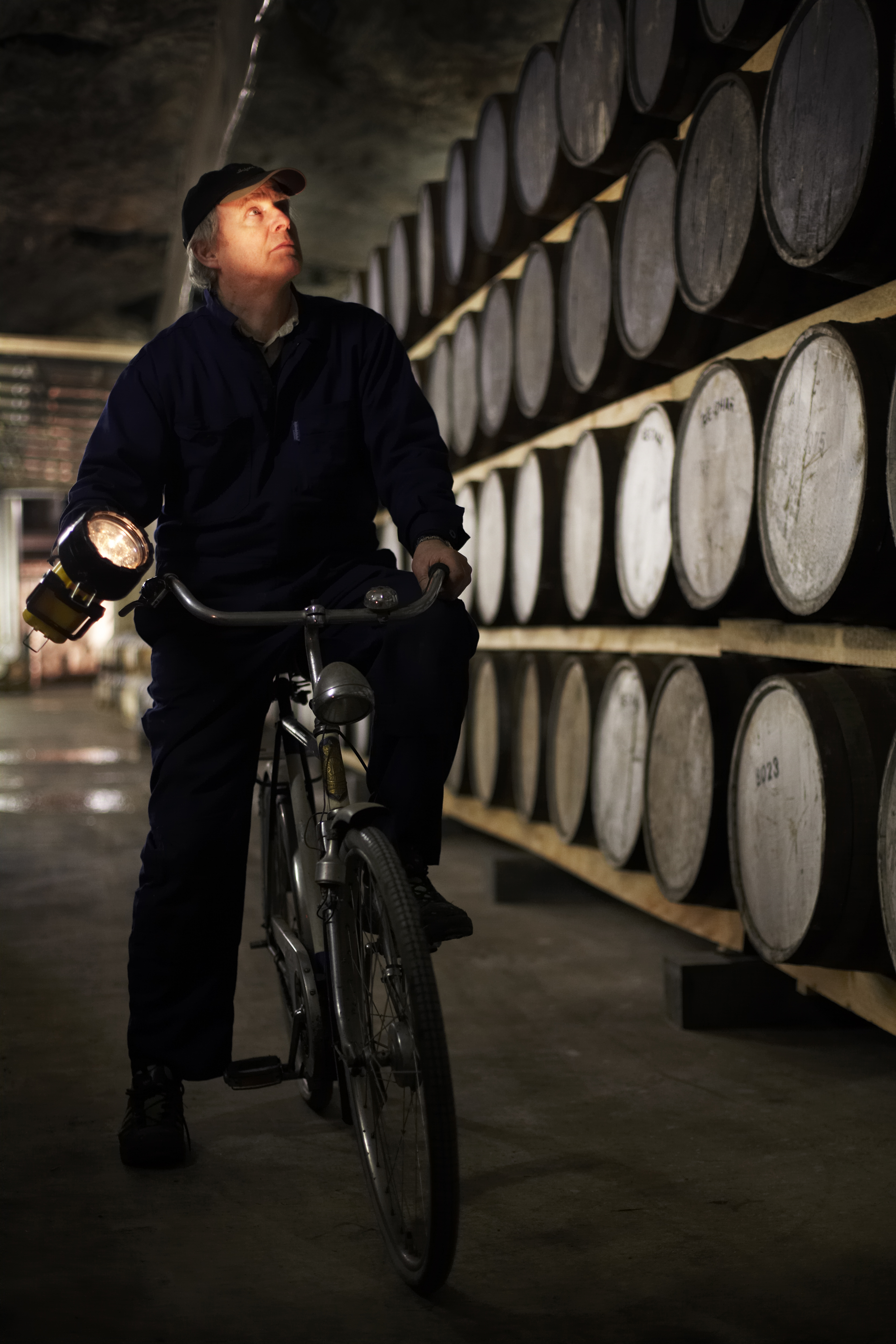
At Bodås iron mine

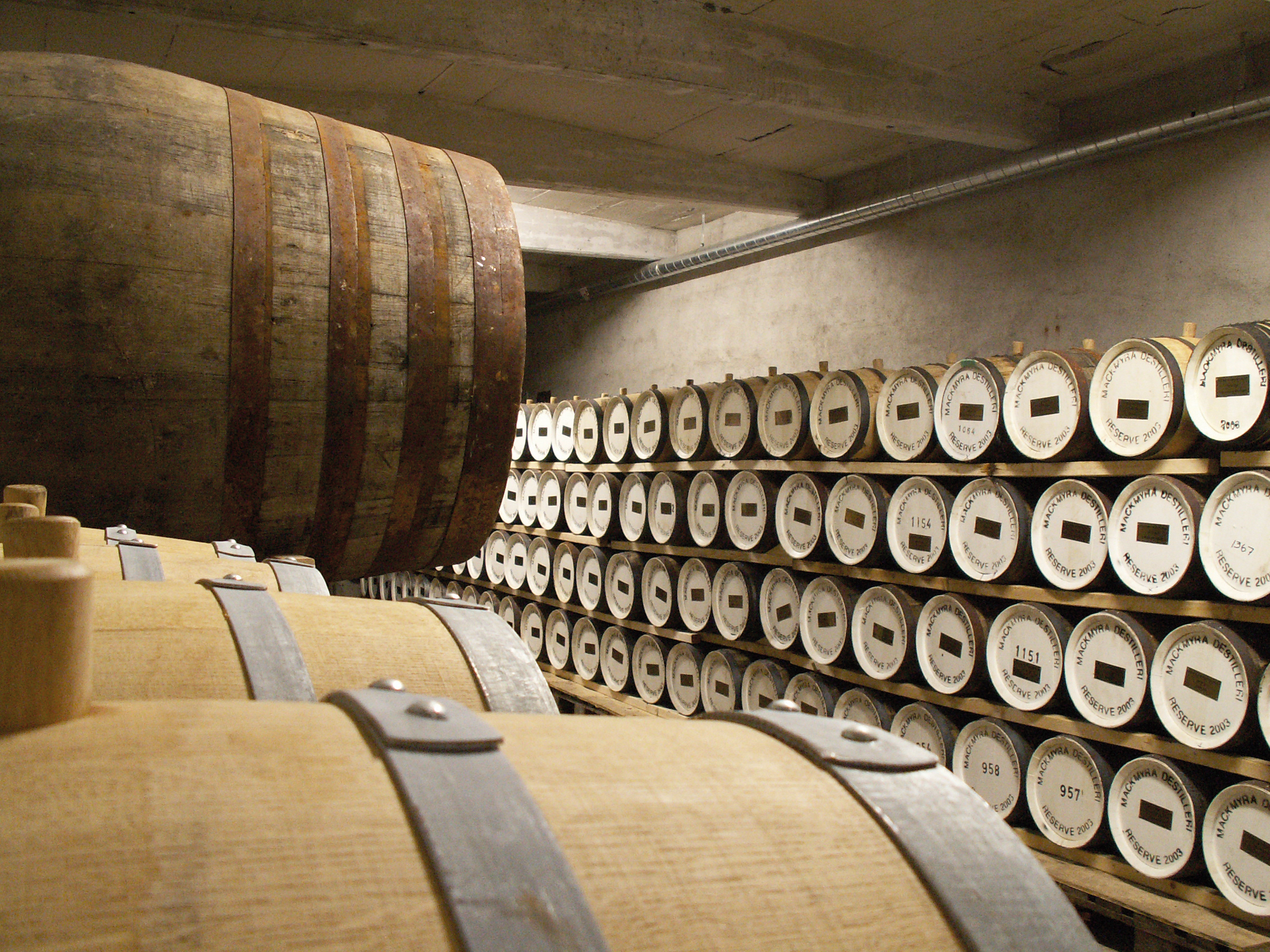
At Feather Islands near Stockholm

Mackmyra copper stills
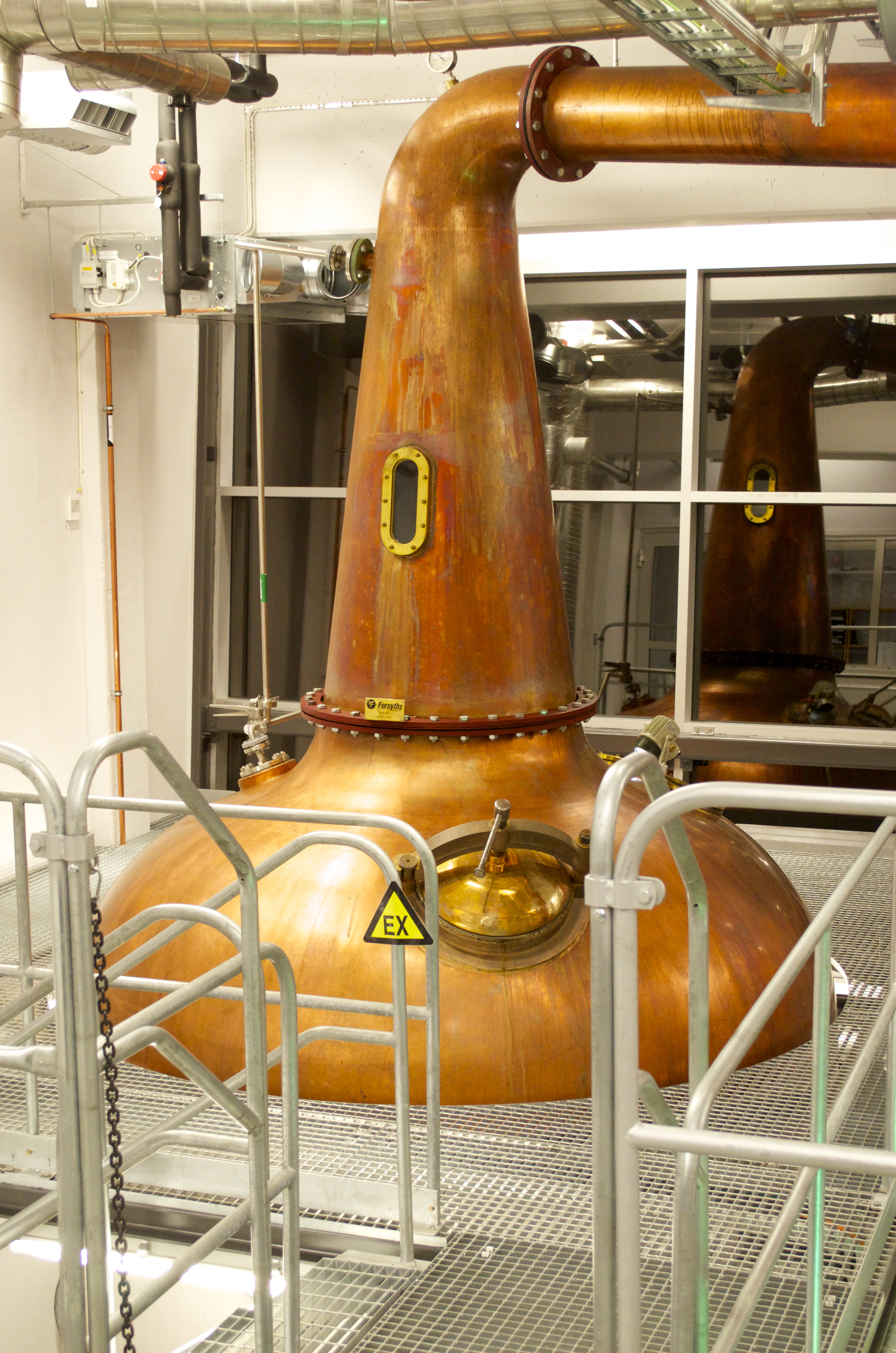
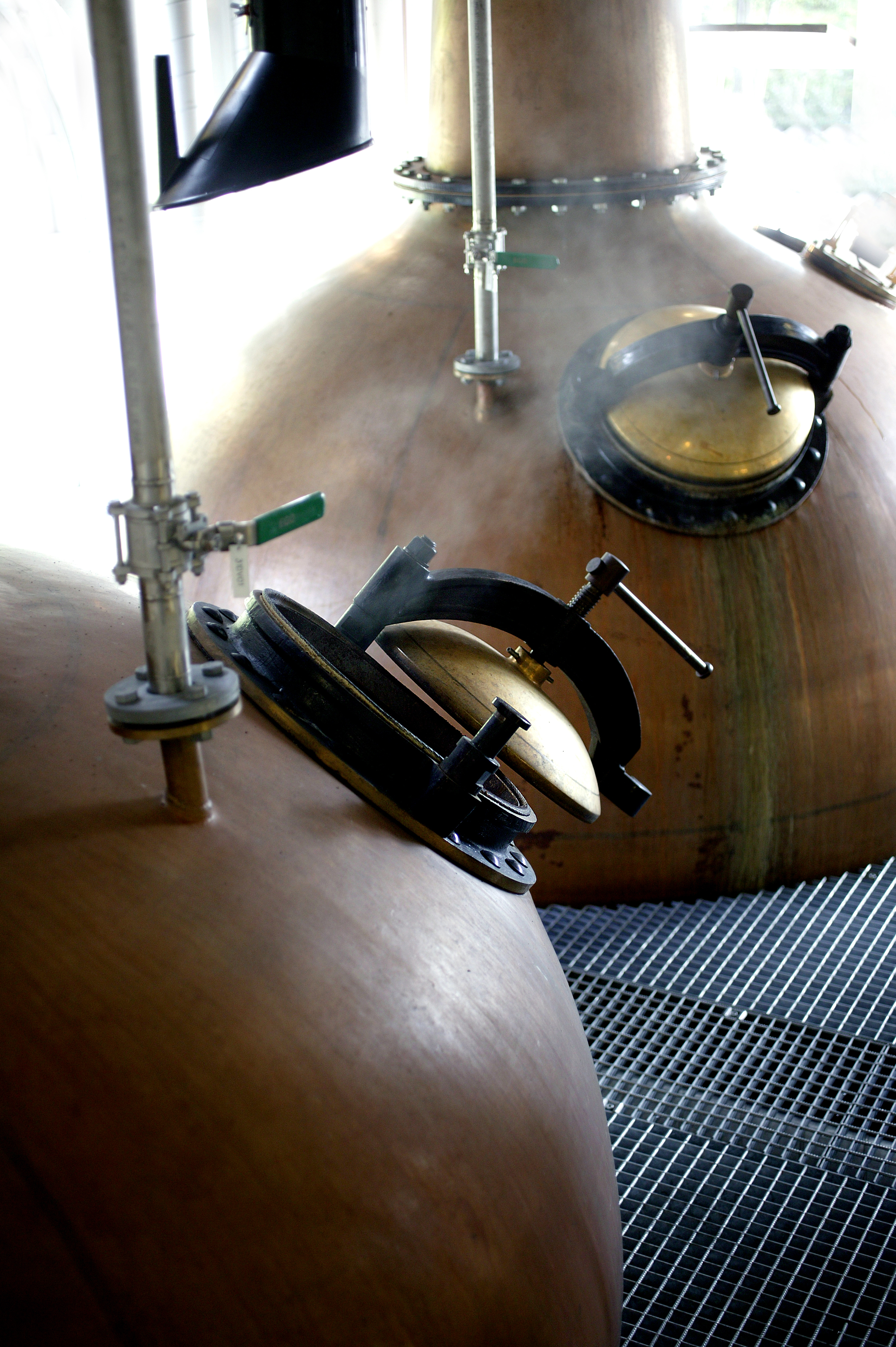

All ingredients used in the production are sourced within a 75-mile (121 km) radius from Mackmyra, except for the yeast, which is from Rotebro. The water undergoes a natural filtration process in an esker nearby and is only sterilized with a high-intensity UV light. The peat is from a local bog near Österfärnebo, and the distillery uses barley from Dalarna and Strömsta Manor in Enköping.

Mackmyra bottles all of its wares in their natural color, without additives, and ages their spirits in four different cask types: bourbon, sherry, Swedish oak and in a special signature cask made from classic American bourbon casks and Swedish oak. The whisky is generally matured 50 meters below ground in the disused Bodås Mine in Hofors, and most releases have been at cask strength, except for The First Edition and Mackmyra Brukswhisky. Mackmyra filed for insolvency in 2024.

=== Distilleries ===
Mackmyra has two active distilleries. The first went on stream at Mackmyra in 2002, featuring a full-sized pot still from Forsyth's in Rothes, Scotland, Swedish stainless steel washbacks and a German mash tun, with a production capacity of 600,000 bottles a year.

A second distillery, about 6 miles (10 km) east of Mackmyra village, was built and went on stream in 2011. The project cost has been estimated at SEK 50 million, featuring two full-sized pot stills with a production capacity of 1.8 M bottles a year. It's seven stories high, using gravity to power many internal processes within the distillery, resulting in about 45% less energy use compared to the first distillery.

== Products ==
Mackmyra products
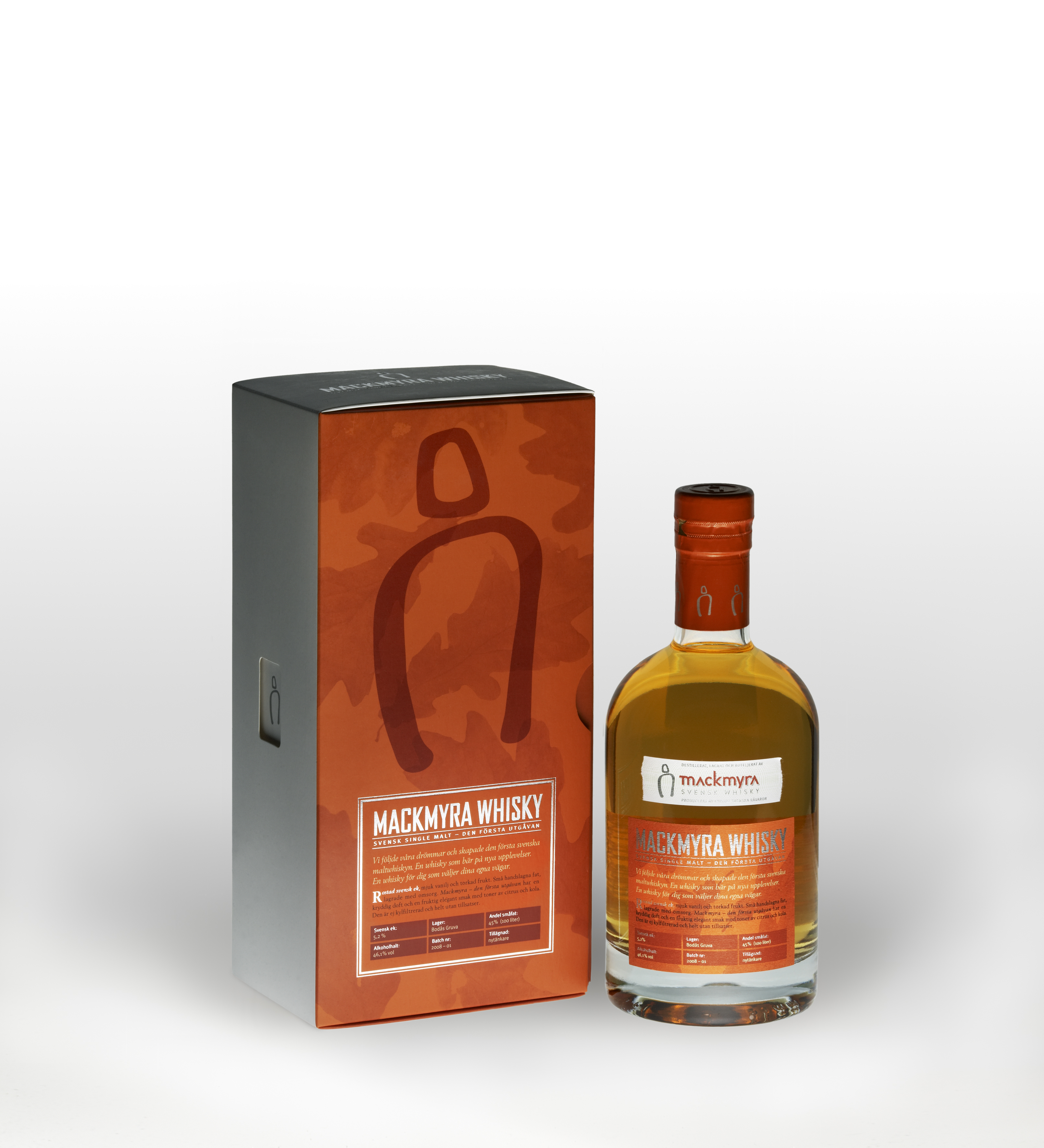
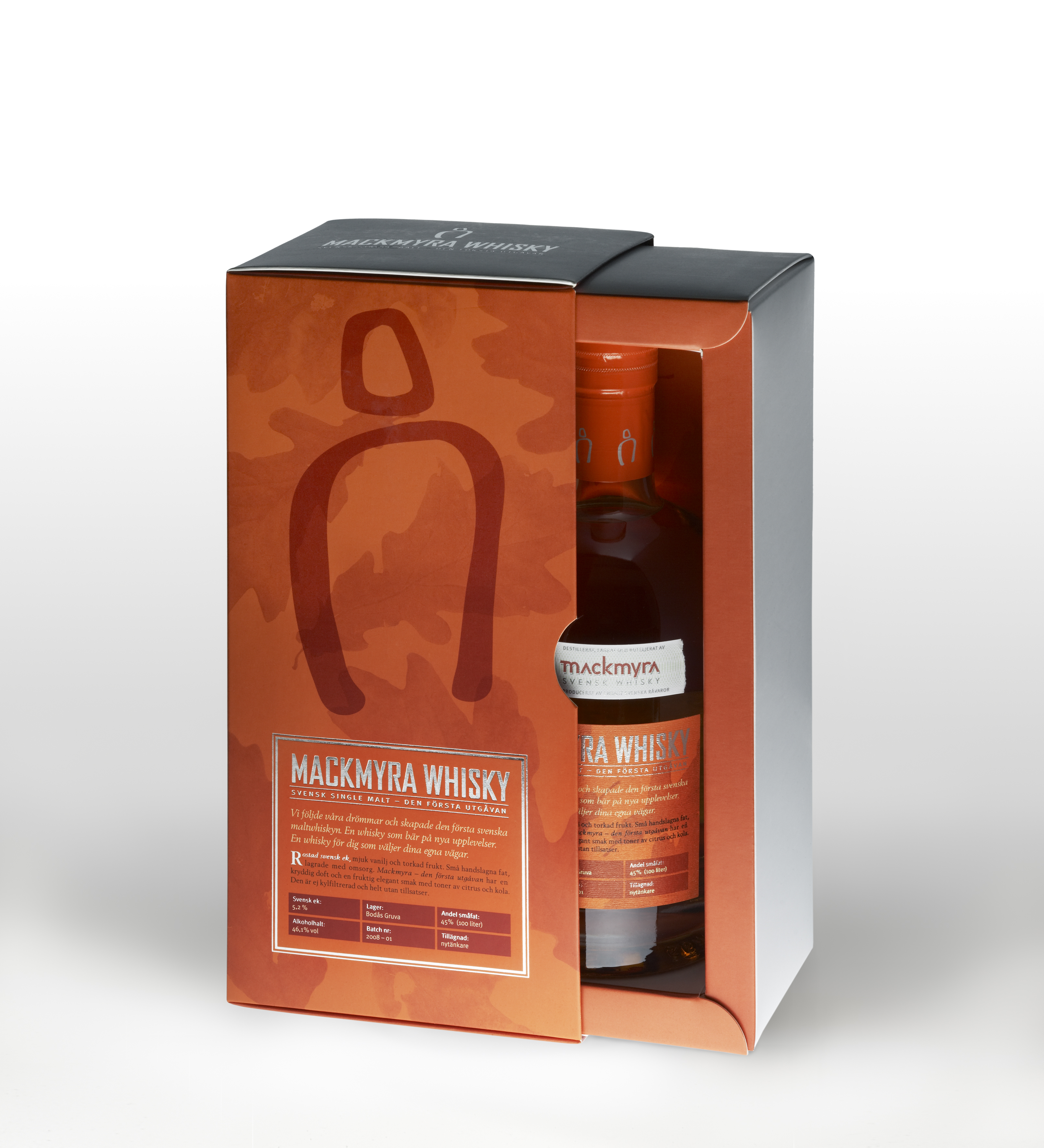

Standard Range

- The First Edition (ABV 46.1%) – Introduced in 2008, and the first Swedish whisky produced in large volumes since Skeppets Whisky.
- Mackmyra Brukswhisky (ABV 41.1%) – Introduced in 2010, and sold internationally as The Swedish Whisky.
- Mackmyra Svensk Rök (ABV 46.1%) – Introduced in 2013, and the first Swedish single malt

Special edition bottlings

- Mackmyra Midvinter – A limited-edition series, launched in November 2013.
- Mackmyra Midnattssol – A limited-edition series, launched in May 2014.
- Mackmyra Moment – A series of whiskies from handpicked casks selected by the master blender
- Mackmyra Frihet / Freedom Collection - 1 Litre version of the distilleries best-loved releases.
- Mackmyra Reserve – A single barrel whisky made to order and stored until ready to drink in 30-litre casks. The customer picks recipe and cask type.
- Mackmyra 10 år – 10-year-old limited edition whisky.
- Mackmyra Destination (ABV 48.7%) - Introduced in 2022, limited to only 10,000 bottles ever produced
- Mackmyra Scorpions - A collaboration with the German rock band Scorpions (band)
- Mackmyra Intelligens - Created using artificial intelligence developed by Fourkind and Microsoft, designed to innovate flavour profiles.

Past special edition bottlings

- Mackmyra Preludium – 2006–2007
- Mackmyra Privus – 2006
- Mackmyra Special – 2008–2013

Other spirits

- Vit Hund (ABV 46.1%) – An unmatured raw whisky
- Bee (ABV 22%) – A whisky and honey liqueur

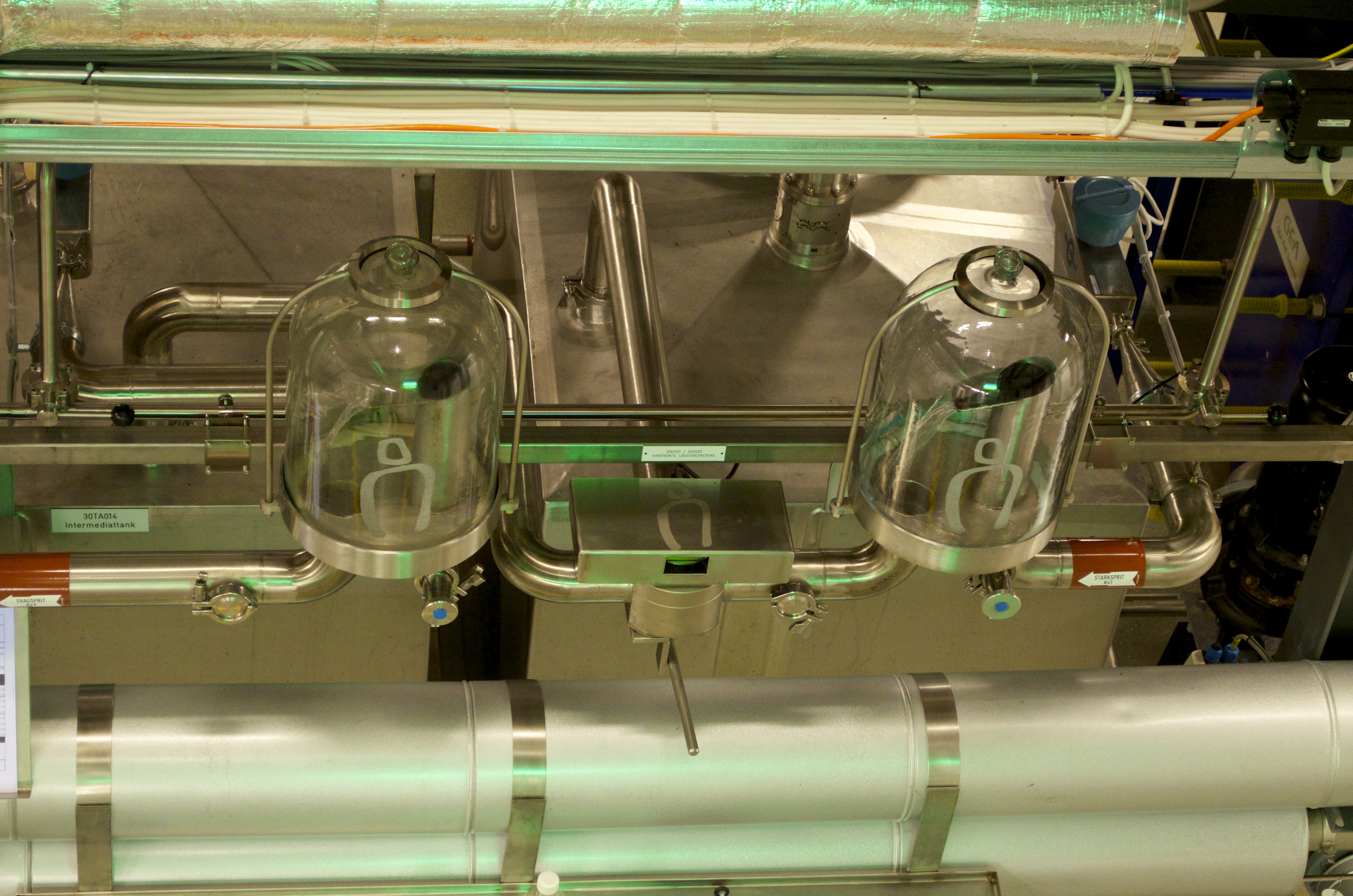
A spirit safe at Mackmyra gravity distillery.

== Awards ==
Mackmyra have won several awards at international spirit competitions. For example:

- Mackmyra Brukswhisky have been named "European Whisky of the Year" by Jim Murray in the Whisky Bible, and was awarded gold by The International Wine and Spirit Competition (IWSC) in 2010.
- In 2012, Mackmyra received a trophy as the "European Spirits Producer of the Year" by the IWSC, and was awarded gold for Moment Skog and Mackmyra Special 08. Gold have also previously been awarded in 2011 for The First Edition, Moment Drivved, Moment Medvind and Mackmyra Reserve.
- In 2013 the distillery was awarded Gold Outstanding by the IWSC and Three Golden Stars by the International Taste and Quality Institute for Moment Glöd single malt whisky.

== See also ==
- List of whisky brands
- Single malt whisky
