= Still =

Apparatus used to distill liquid mixtures

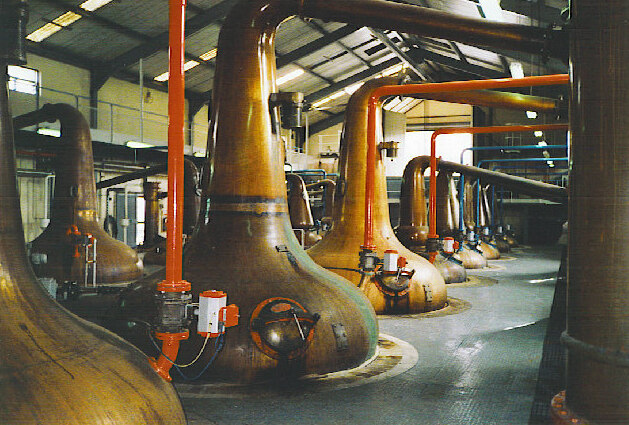
Swan-necked copper pot stills in the Glenfiddich distillery in Dufftown, Moray, Scotland, 2003

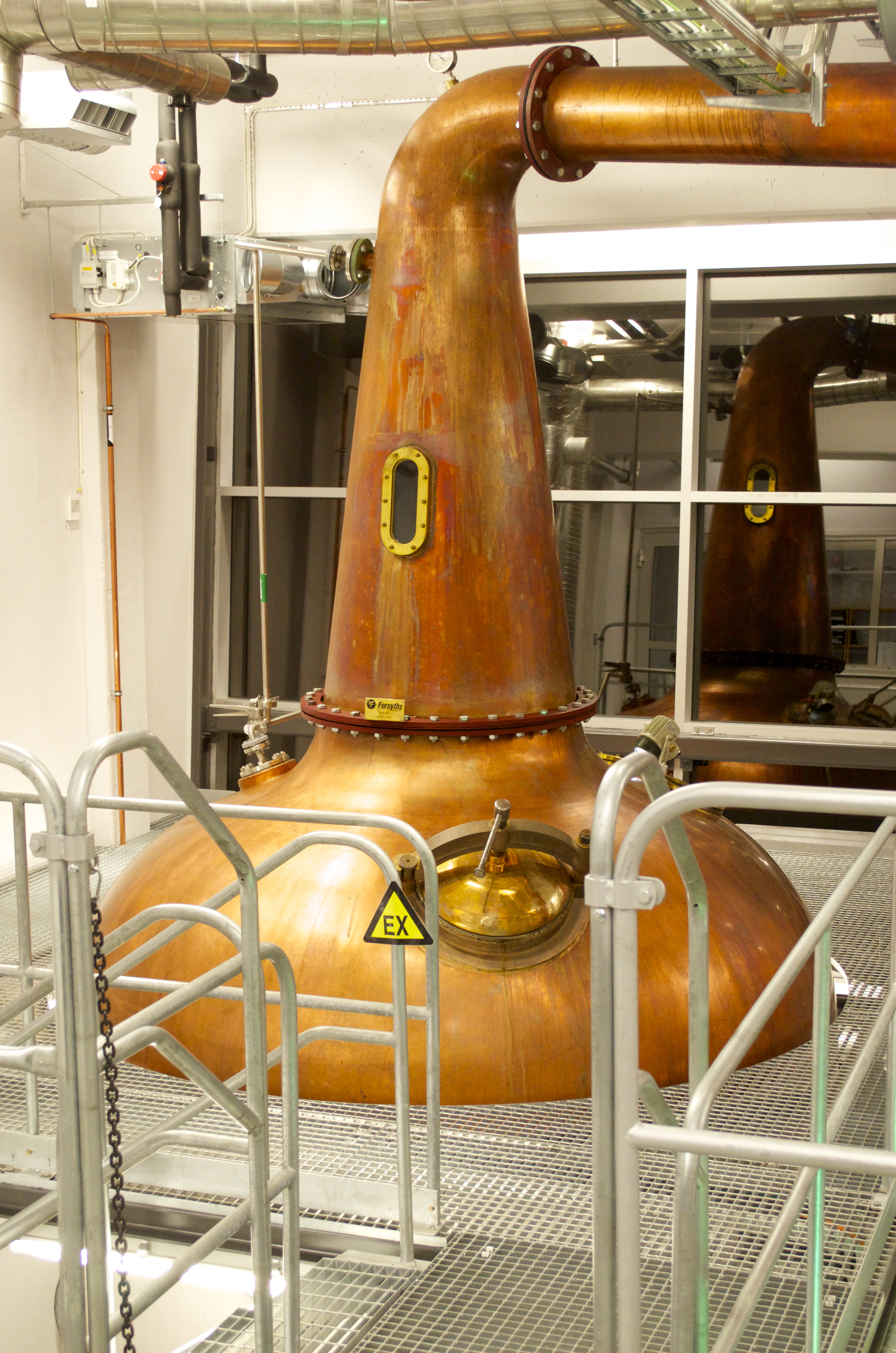
A still at Mackmyra Whisky Distillery

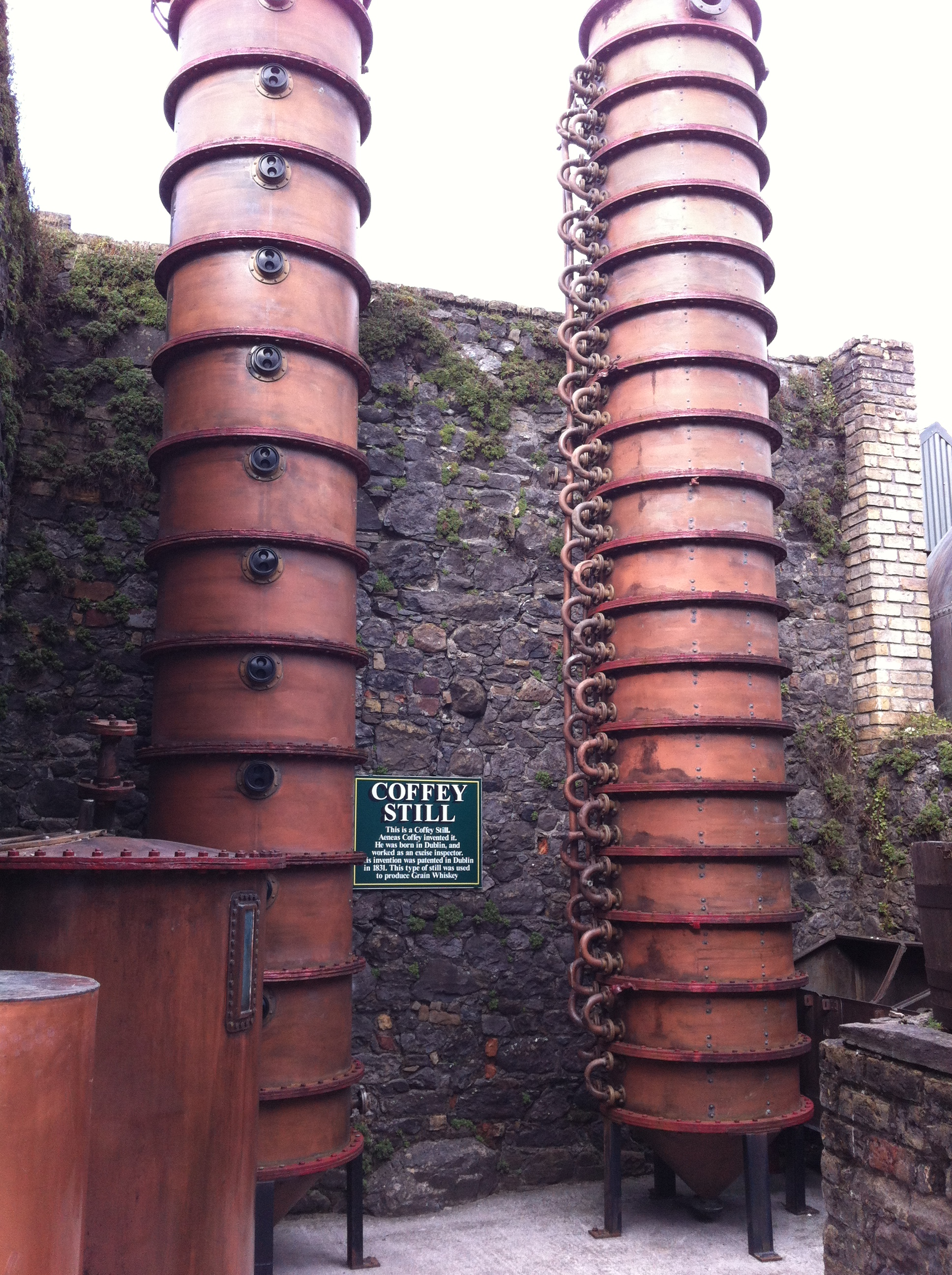
Column still from Kilbeggan Distillery in County Westmeath in Ireland.

A still is an apparatus used to distill liquid mixtures by heating to selectively boil and then cooling to condense the vapor. A still uses the same concepts as a basic distillation apparatus, but on a much larger scale. Stills have been used to produce perfume and medicine, water for injection (WFI) for pharmaceutical use, generally to separate and purify different chemicals, and to produce distilled beverages containing ethanol.

== Application ==
Since ethanol boils at a much lower temperature than water, simple distillation can separate ethanol from water by applying heat to the mixture. Historically, a copper vessel was used for this purpose, since copper removes undesirable sulfur-based compounds from the alcohol. However, many modern stills are made of stainless steel pipes with copper linings to prevent erosion of the entire vessel and lower copper levels in the waste product (which in large distilleries is processed to become animal feed). Copper is the preferred material for stills because it yields an overall better-tasting spirit. The taste is improved by the chemical reaction between the copper in the still and the sulfur compounds created by the yeast during fermentation. These unwanted and flavor-changing sulfur compounds are chemically removed from the final product resulting in a smoother, better-tasting drink. All copper stills will require repairs about every eight years due to the precipitation of copper-sulfur compounds. The beverage industry was the first to implement a modern distillation apparatus and led the way in developing equipment standards which are now widely accepted in the chemical industry.

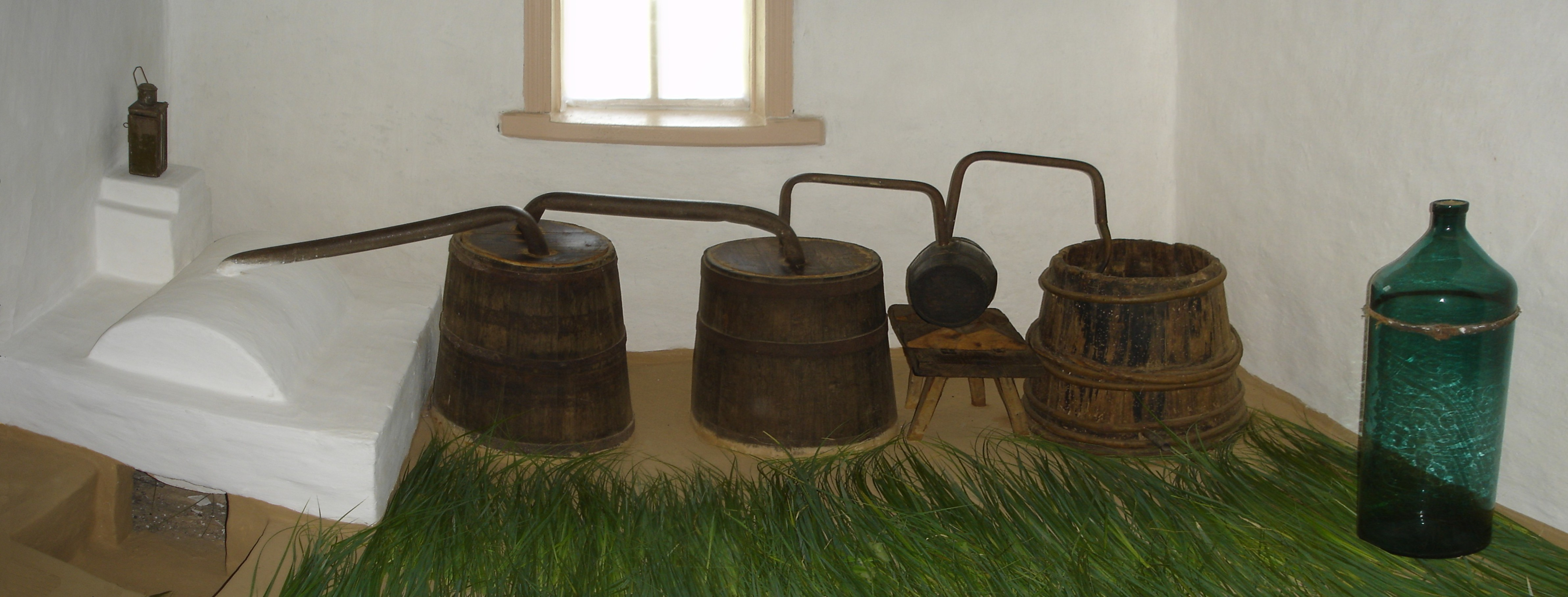
Historical vodka stills at the Museum of Folk Architecture & Life in Pereiaslav, Ukraine, 2007

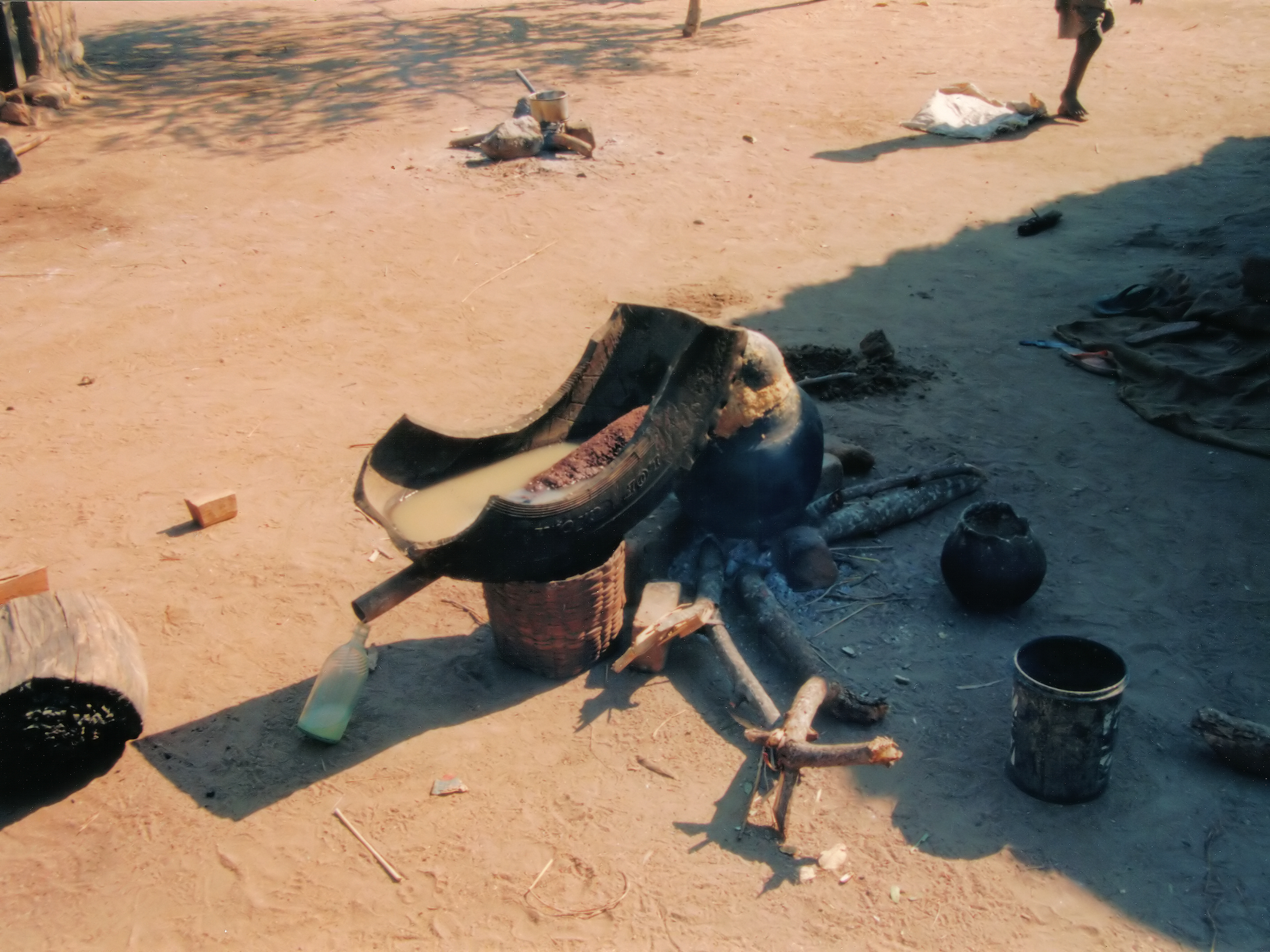
Zambian artisanal Kachasu still and cooler

There is also an increasing usage of the distillation of gin under glass and PTFE, and even at reduced pressures, to facilitate a fresher product. This is irrelevant to alcohol quality because the process starts with triple distilled grain alcohol, and the distillation is used solely to harvest botanical flavors such as limonene and other terpene like compounds. The ethyl alcohol is relatively unchanged.

The simplest standard distillation apparatus is commonly known as a pot still, consisting of a single heated chamber and a vessel to collect purified alcohol. A pot still incorporates only one condensation, whereas other types of distillation equipment have multiple stages which result in higher purification of the more volatile component (alcohol). Pot still distillation gives an incomplete separation, but this can be desirable for the flavor of some distilled beverages.

If a purer distillate is desired, a reflux still is the most common solution. Reflux stills incorporate a fractionating column, commonly created by filling copper vessels with glass beads to maximize available surface area. As alcohol boils, condenses, and reboils through the column, the effective number of distillations greatly increases. Vodka and gin and other neutral grain spirits are distilled by this method, then diluted to concentrations appropriate for human consumption.

Alcoholic products from home distilleries are common throughout the world but are sometimes in violation of local statutes. The product of illegal stills in the United States is commonly referred to as moonshine and in Ireland, poitín. However, poitín, although made illegal in 1661, has been legal for export in Ireland since 1997. Note that the term moonshine itself is often misused as many believe it to be a specific kind of high-proof alcohol that was distilled from corn, but the term can refer to any illicitly distilled alcohol.

== See also ==
- Distillation
- Distilled water
- Retort
- Alembic
- Column still
- Pot still
- Reflux still
- Solar still
