= Base wine =

Product of early grape fermentation, used to make brandy

Base wine is a type of still wine produced in the first stage of fermentation during the production of sparkling wines and brandies. After the primary fermentation, base wine is first blended into a cuvée, then made into sparkling wine by further fermentation, or distilled into brandy.

The grapes used in the making of base wine are picked when they are green, so that the grape skins do not break during handling and release as little phenols as possible. Excessive phenols in base wine result in partial oxidation, which impairs the flavor and aroma of the final product. Base wine generally contains smaller amounts (up to 20 mg/L) of sulphur than regular wines, as it creates undesired copper(II) sulfate in reaction with copper in the pot stills during distillation into brandy. A quality base wine has an alcohol content level between 10% and 11.5%, and a slightly acidic pH level.
