= Kachasu =

African traditional distilled beverage

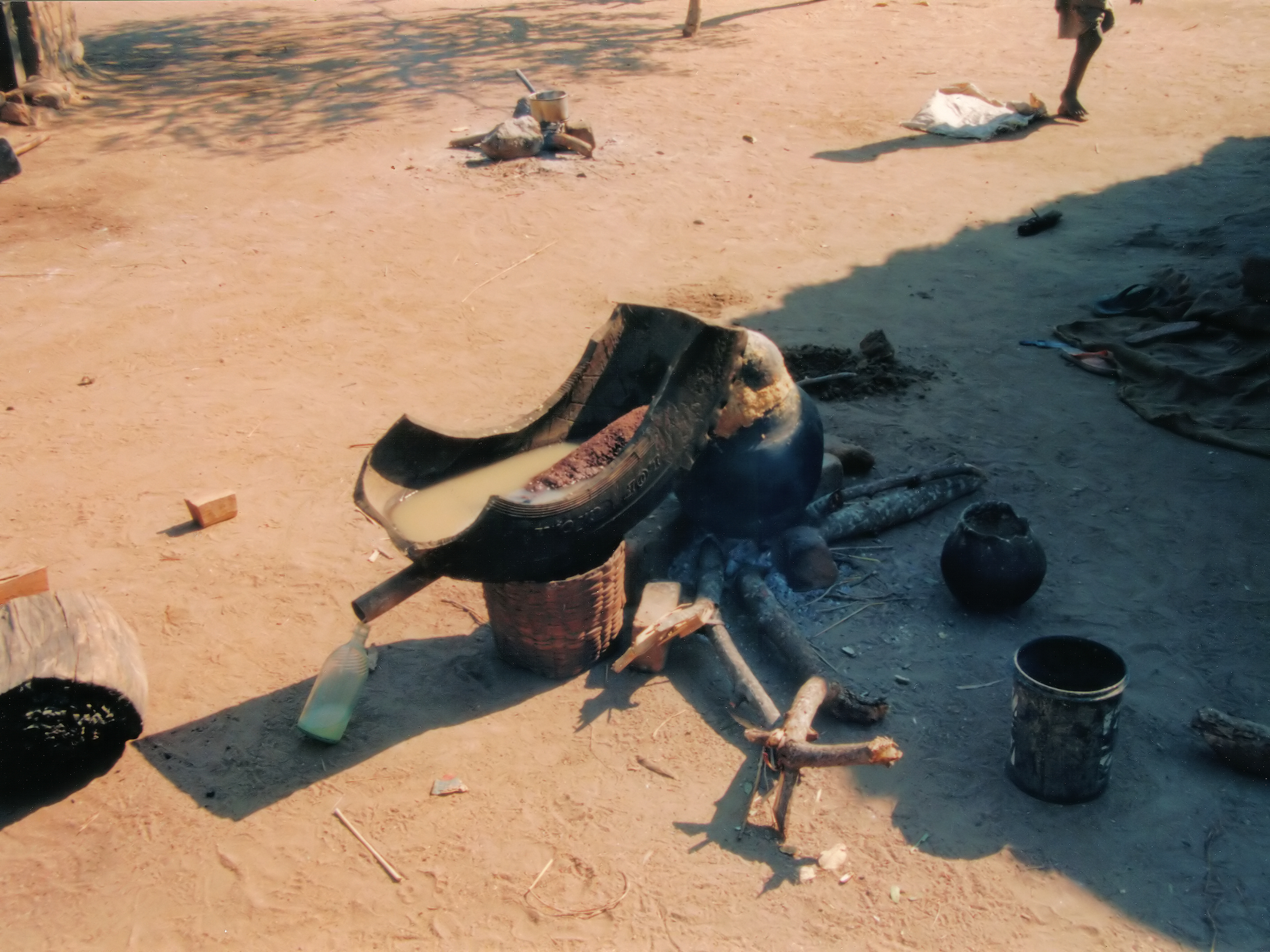
A kachasu still in Zambia

Kachasu, also known as lutuku, is an African traditional distilled beverage.

It is made in Zambia, Zimbabwe, DR Congo and Malawi, mainly in rural parts and poor urban suburbs. It is normally brewed from maize, though finger millet and various fruits like banana peels can also be used. The process involves adding brewers' yeast together with the carbohydrate sources such as maize husks to warm water and heating the mixture for a few minutes. The product is then distilled after it has fully fermented.

The alcohol content of kachasu can vary significantly, depending on the strength of the brew. Studies have found an alcohol content ranging from 20 to 30% up to as high as 70%.
