= Fjäderholmarna =

Group of islands

Coordinates: 59.3306°N 18.1750°E

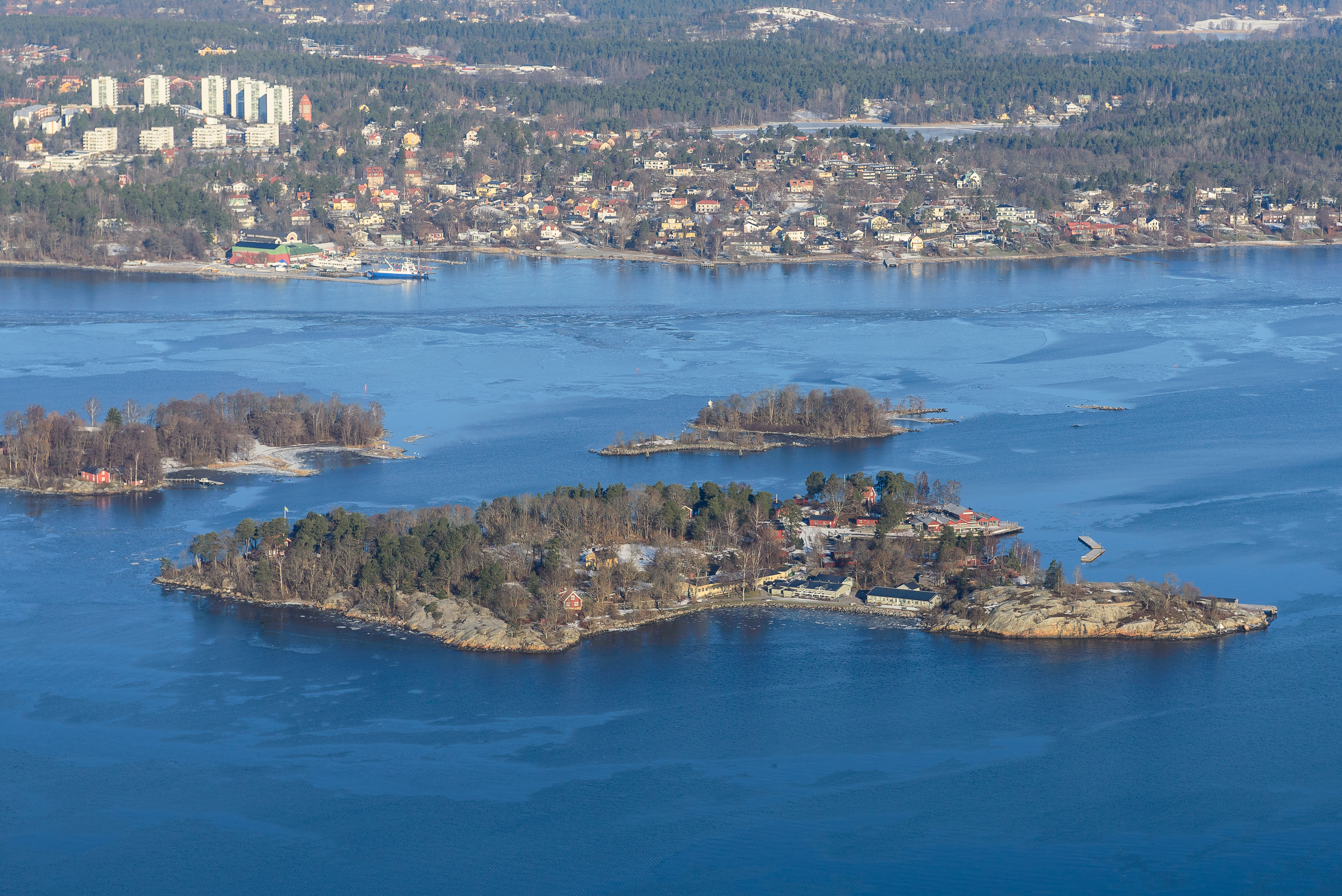
The Fjäderholmarna islands

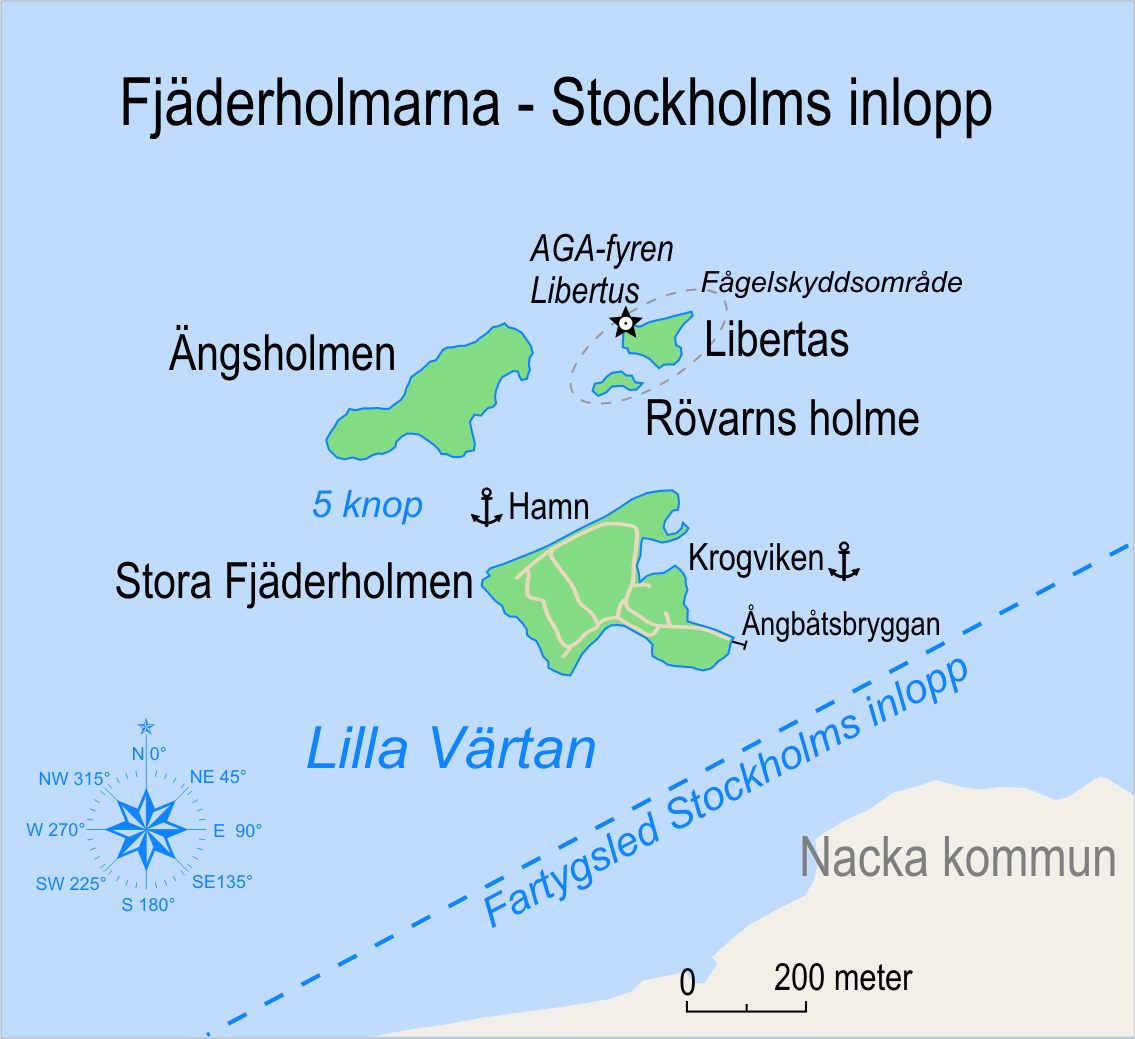
Map of the Fjäderholmarna islands

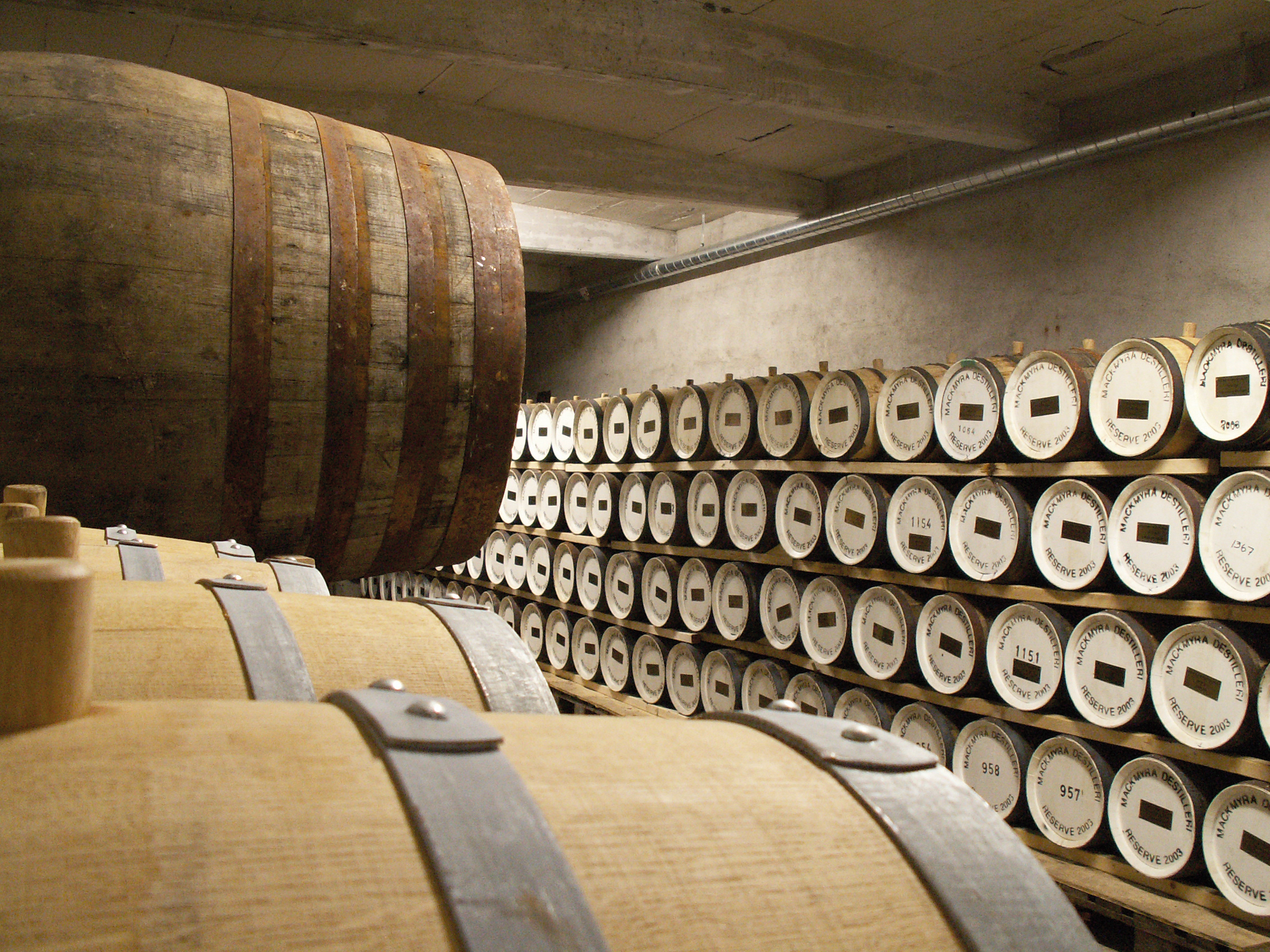
Mackmyra Whisky had one of its warehouses in the underground bunkers of Fjäderholmarna

The Fjäderholmarna (English: Feather Islands) are a group of small islands in the Stockholm archipelago close to downtown Stockholm, Sweden. The Fjäderholmarna consist of the four named islands of Stora Fjäderholmen, Ängsholmen, Libertas and Rövarns Holme, together with a number of smaller islets. The Fjäderholmarna are located within the municipality of Lidingö, and are administered as part of the Royal National City Park.

Stora Fjäderholmen can be reached by regular boat services from various locations in central Stockholm, with a voyage duration of about 20 minutes. The island is home to a number of craft workshops and stores, as well as several restaurants and cafes.
