= Ängsholmen, Eskilstuna Municipality =

Ängsholmen
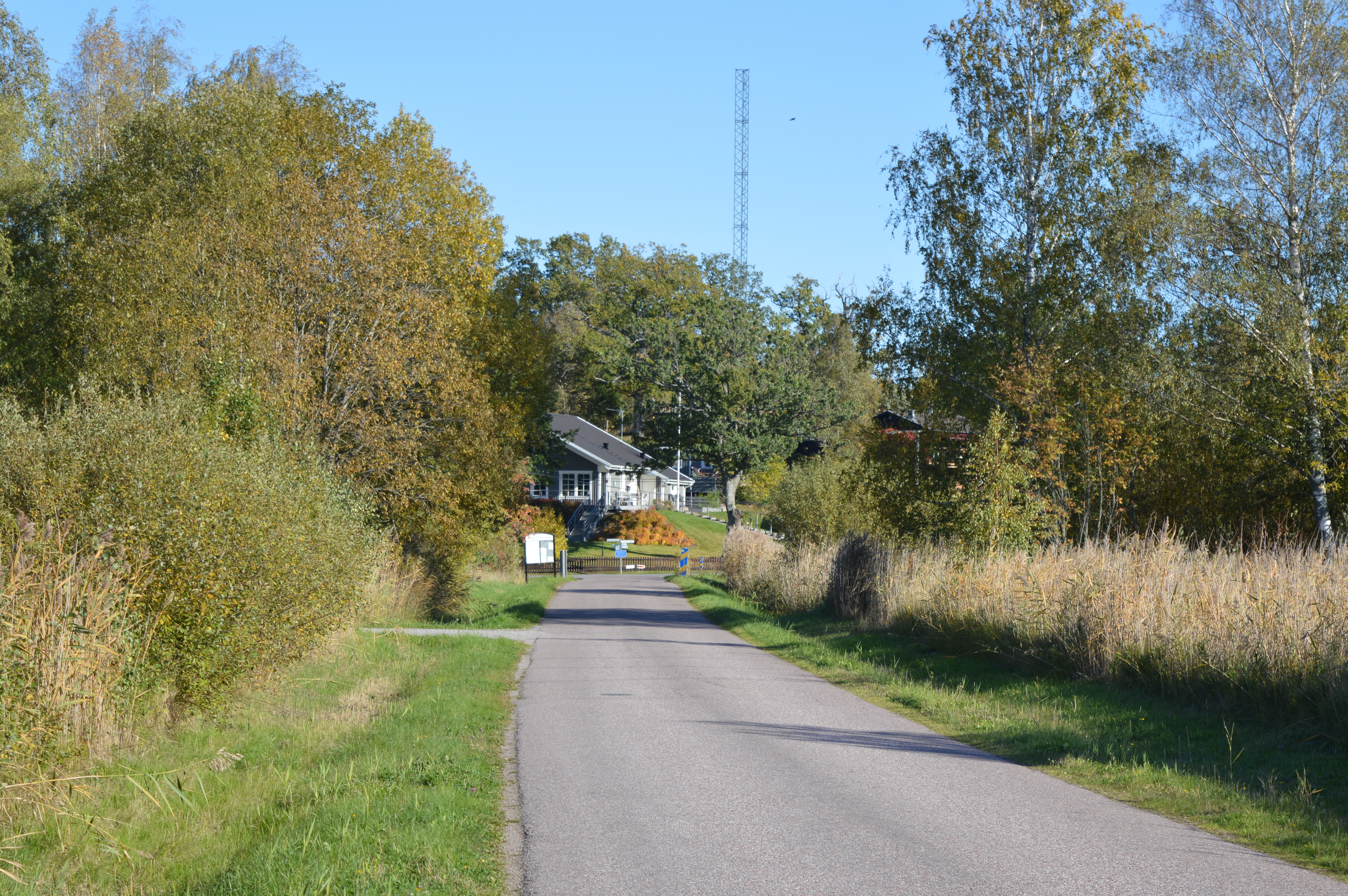

- Location within Södermanland Location within Sweden
- Coordinates: 59°27′N 16°28′E
- Country: Sweden
- Province: Södermanland
- County: Södermanland County
- Municipality: Eskilstuna Municipality

Area
  - Total: 0.59 km^{2} (0.23 sq mi)

Population (31 December 2010)
  - Total: 222
  - Density: 378/km^{2} (980/sq mi)
- Time zone: UTC+1 (CET)
  - Summer (DST): UTC+2 (CEST)

Ängsholmen is a locality situated in Eskilstuna Municipality, Södermanland County, Sweden with 222 inhabitants in 2010.
