= Spirit safe =

Device used in the distillation of Scotch whisky

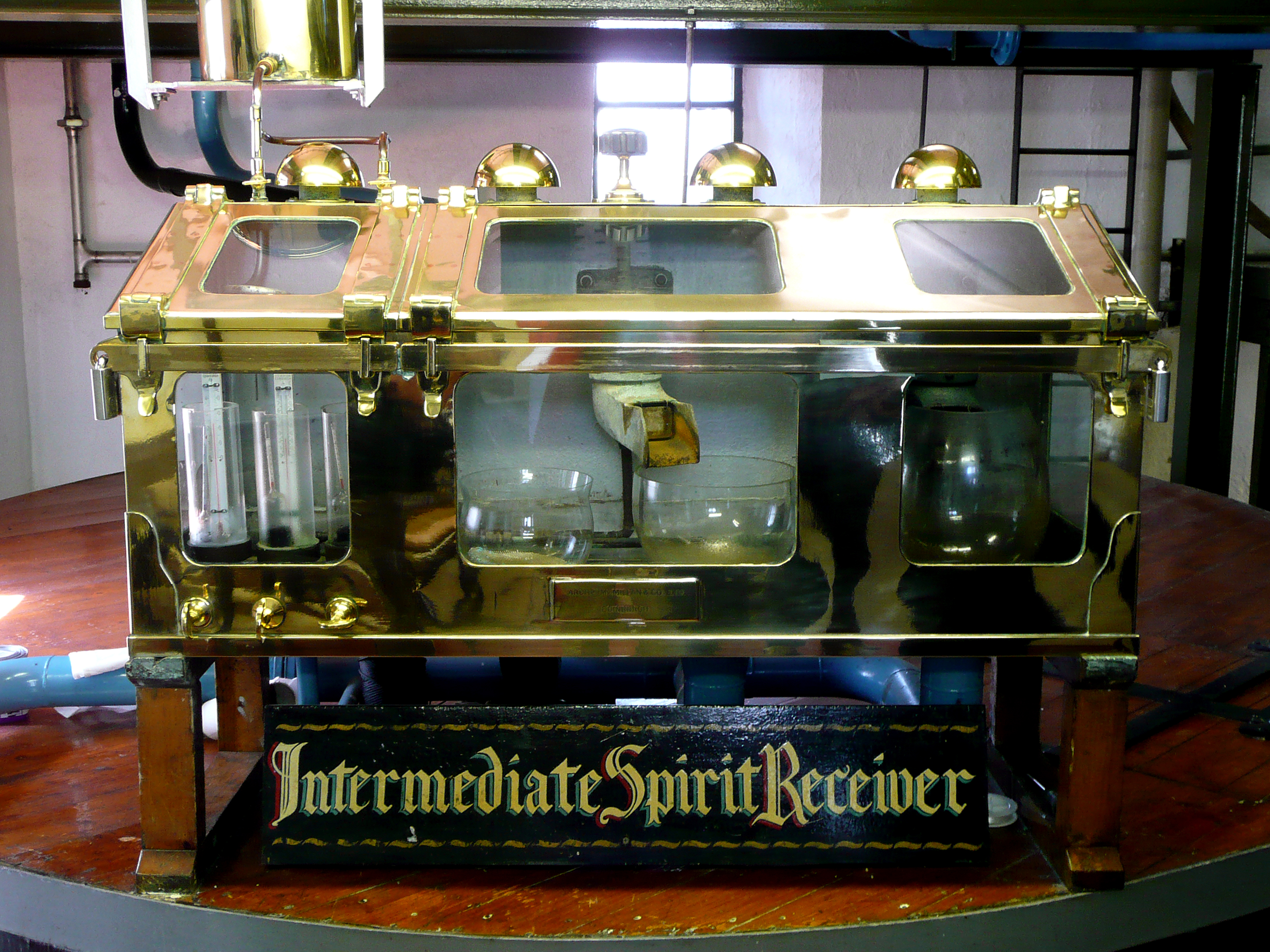
The spirit safe at Ardbeg Distillery

Diagram detailing a typical triple distillation spirit

A spirit safe or intermediate spirit receiver is an enclosed device used in the distillation of Scotch whisky. The distillate from the still passes into it, and can be seen through the glass sides or windows, but cannot be directly accessed. The distiller can analyse the spirit inside the device, and decide where it should be sent.

== Operation ==
After the spirit has been distilled inside the still it is fed into the spirit safe. The spirit safe then splits it into three parts, the foreshot, the heart, and the feints (sometimes called the head, heart, and tail). The heart is then removed and sent to the next step of the spirit making process to be finished, while the foreshot and feints is sent back into the still to help further distilling. This process is highly efficient, minimizing the amount of waste created during the distillation process.

The spirit safe controls the flow of the foreshot, heart, and feints by measuring the temperature and density of the distillates, which can be used to determine its alcohol content. Because it is a closed system with no direct contact, there is far less risk of contaminates and outside influences when measuring the distillate. Each distillery will adjust the cut points of the distillate depending on flavor profiles and alcohol content preferences.

== History ==
The spirit safe was invented in the early 19th century as a workaround for new duty laws on Highland distilleries. The spirit box quickly evolved into the modern style, with glass panels protecting the inside workings and large padlocks locking it, with the keys only held by the Customs and Excise officers.

In 1870 there was a whisky boom in Scotland, which caused a shortage of Customs and Excise staff. This forced a relaxing of distilling laws enforcement. Consequently, the standards and regulations compliance began to fall more on the distillery, who were required to take detailed and dated notes on all processes. With the digital advancements of the late 1900s the spirit safe fell out of favor, as manual processes became less common.
