= Campari (disambiguation) =

Campari is a bitter alcoholic aperitif.

Campari may also refer to:

- Campari Group, an Italian company which produces the aperitif and other alcoholic beverages
  - Campari America, a subsidiary launched in 1992
- Campari tomato, a popular variety of tomato in North America
- Gaspare Campari (1828–1882), inventor of the aperitif
- Giuseppe Campari (1892–1933), Italian opera singer and Grand Prix motor racing driver
- Campari Knoepffler (born 1959), Nicaraguan Olympic swimmer
- CaMPARI, a photoconvertible calcium sensor
