= Garavoglia =

Garavoglia is an Italian surname. Notable people with the name include:

- Luca Garavoglia (born 1969), Italian businessman, chairman of Gruppo Campari
- Rosa Anna Garavoglia (1933–2016), Italian billionaire, owner of 51% of Gruppo Campari
