= Chalvignac Group =

France-based industrial company

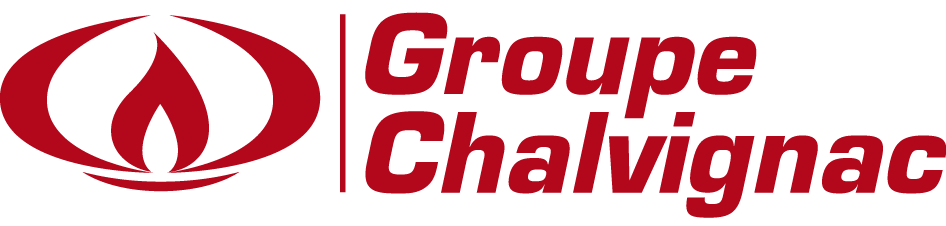
- Type: SAS
- Headquarters: Jarnac-Champagne, France
- Area served: Worldwide
- Key people: Philippe Tizon, Jacques Bel
- Products: Distillation processes, wine-growing trailers, stainless steel/fiber tanks
- Services: winery equipment retailing
- Number of employees: 200
- Subsidiaries: Sodipia, Chalvignac Prulho Distillation, Simonneau, Maitre, Chalvignac Industries, Dabrigeon

The Chalvignac Group is an international industrial company. Its headquarters are in Jarnac-Champagne, Charente-Maritime, France. It is a global specialist in distillation processes. This group proposed agricultural and wine-growing trailers, stainless steel and fiber tanks, and offers retail winery equipment. Created in the early 20th century, the main company Chalvignac became the center of the Nov-Tech group in 1984, later renamed as the Chalvignac Group.

== Business units ==
=== Boilermaking ===
==== Distillation ====
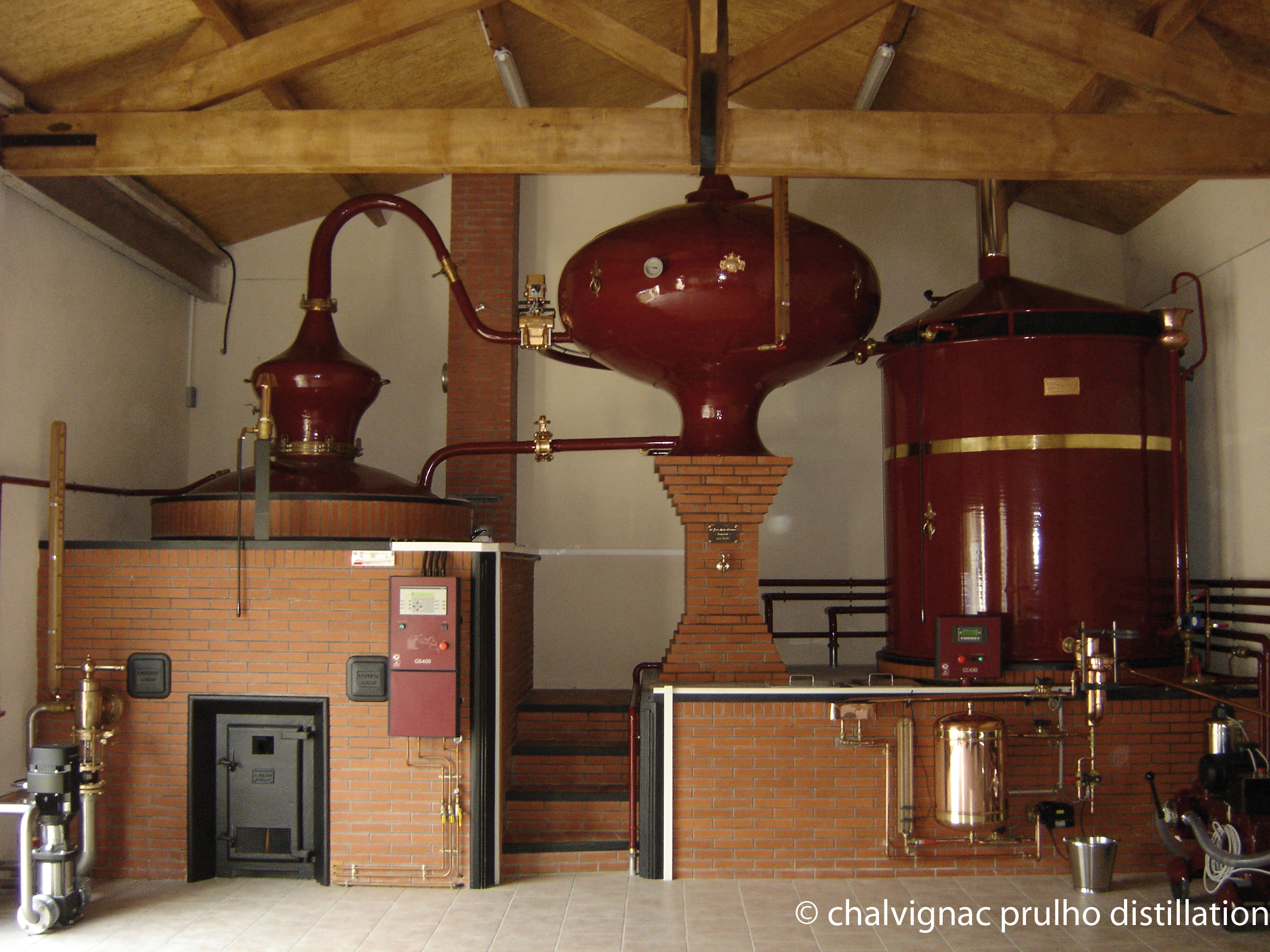
Charentais pot still manufactured by Chalvignac Prulho Distillation

Chalvignac's core business is manufacturing distillation pots. This apparatus is necessary for cognac distillation. It is operated by Chalvignac Prulho Distillation. Its flagship product is the traditional “Charentais” pot still, which enables it to distil not only cognac, but also Calvados, Armagnac, rum, tequila, whiskey, and other brandies. It also provides distillation columns to obtain mainly Armagnac and single-distilled alcohols in continuous production. Chalvignac also designs and produces high-technology equipment to set and supervise the distillation process, including gas/steam supply setting, distillate casting (heads, "brouillis" or hearts, and tails), and temperature regulation.

Its clients include cognac brands as Hennessy, Martell and Courvoisier.

=== Tanks ===
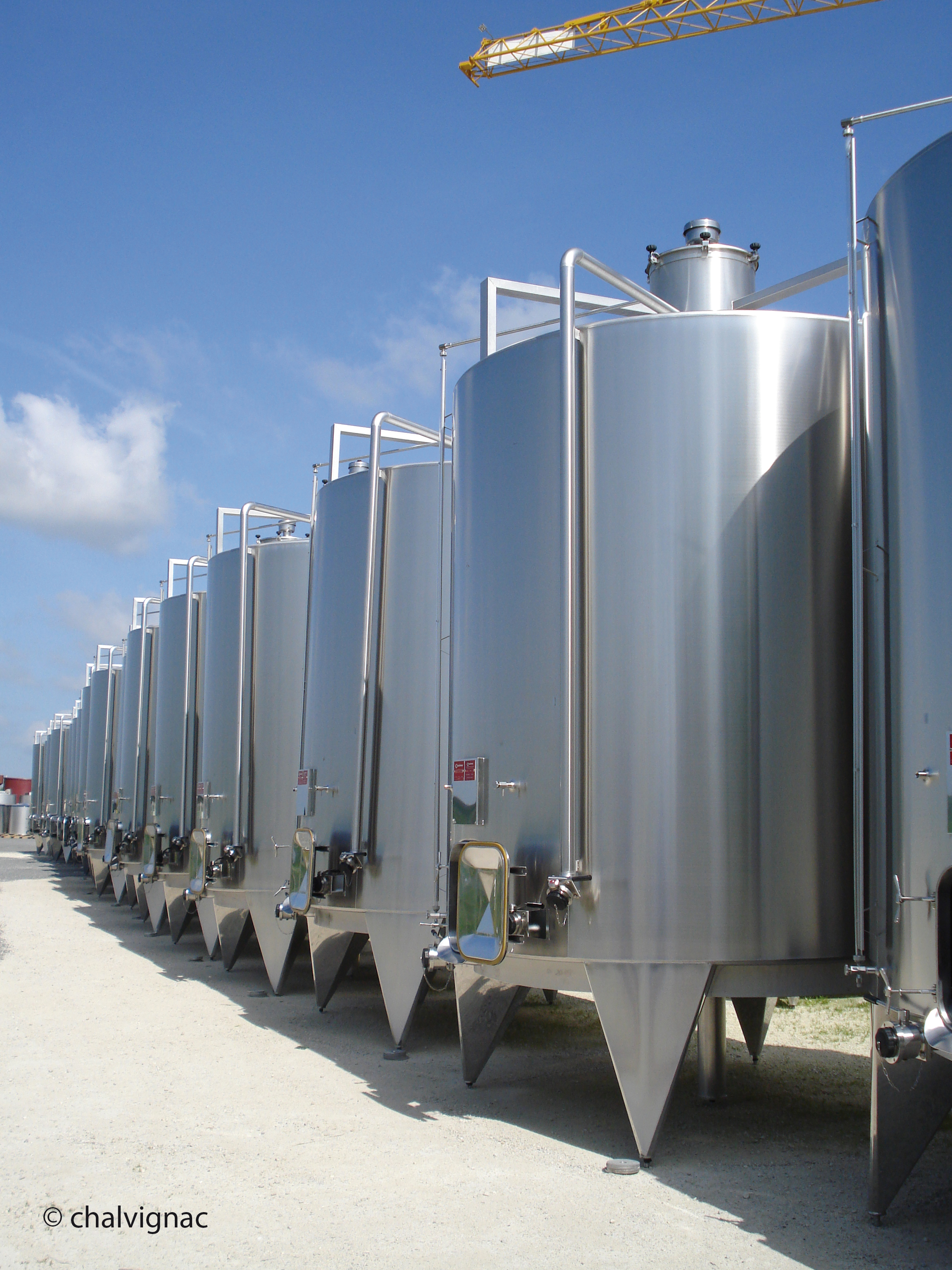
Chalvignac stainless steel tanks

Distillation tanks are offered through three subsidiaries. Some tanks are manufactured for wine and spirit companies, notably Moët & Chandon, but also for industrial groups producing food and non-food liquids.

Stainless steel wine-growing and stocking tanks are manufactured by Chalvignac at Jarnac-Champagne workshop.

Wine-growing and stocking tanks in composite materials are built by the Sodipia subsidiary, located at St-Médard de Mussidan, Dordogne.

Stainless tanks for other purposes, such as foodstuffs (chocolate) and non-food goods (cosmetics) are manufactured by the Dabrigeon subsidiary, located at Pérignac, Charente-Maritime.

=== Trailers ===
The Chalvignac Group manufactures trailers, having acquired Simonneau C.C.M., located at Sainte-Même, Charente-Maritime (agricultural trailers and wine-press holders) and Maitre, located in Rongères, Allier (agricultural trailers, trays, and manure spreaders).

=== Shops ===
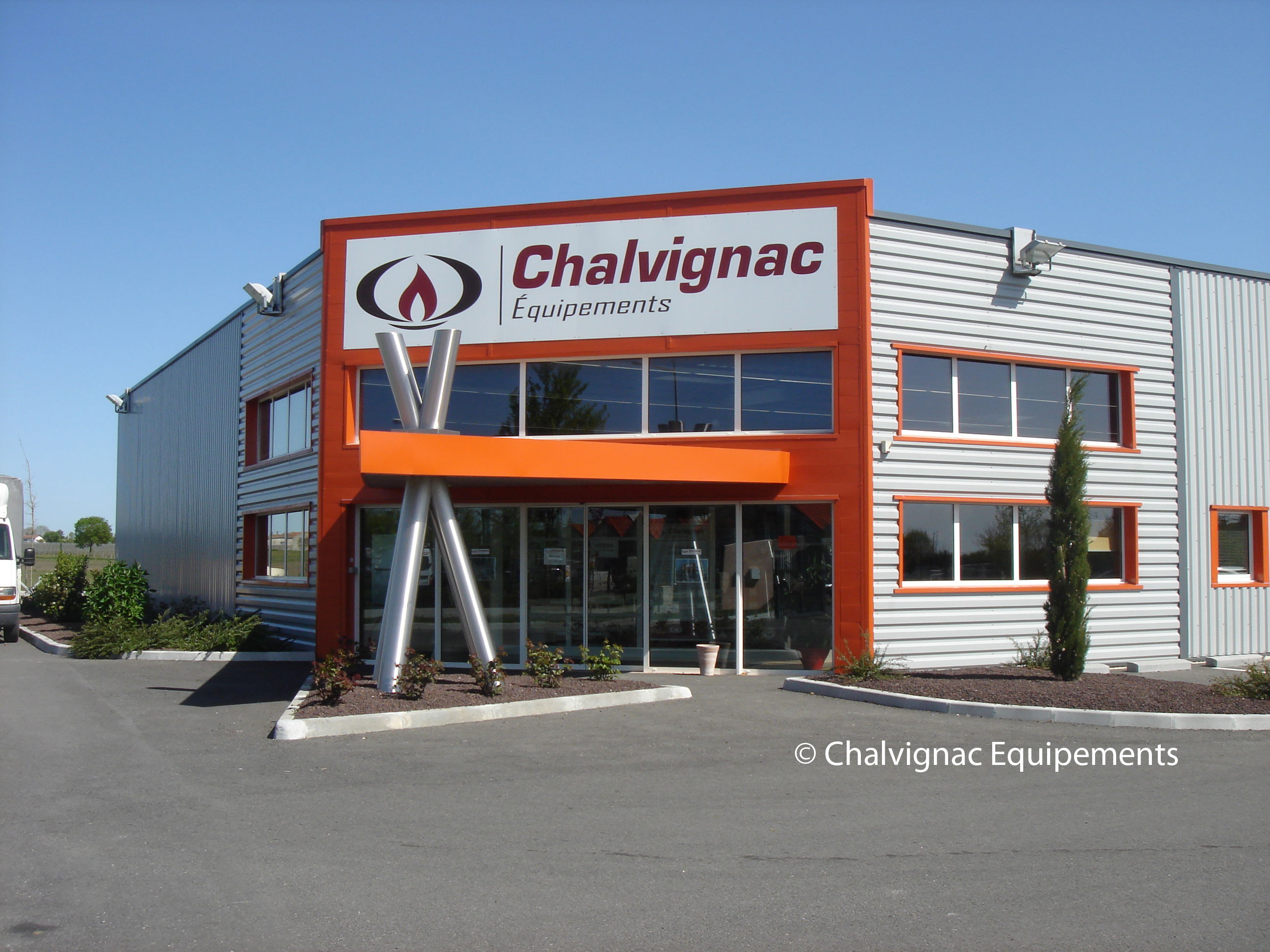
Shop of Chalvignac Equipements in Châteaubernard

Mostly aimed at professionals, Chalvignac Equipements, founded in 1991, offers wine-growing tools, wine-stocking tanks, and pumps.

Chalvignac-Prulho stills for small, boutique, and experimental distilling of liquor products are distributed in South Africa through Distillique. They also provide training on Chalvignac-Prulho stills and general distilling.

== Bibliography ==
- Owens, Bill; Dikty, Alan. The art of distilling whiskey and other spirits [French charentais alambic still]. p. 32. ISBN 978-1-59253-569-9.
