= Campari America =

American spirits maker

Campari America, formerly known as Skyy Spirits, is an American spirits maker that is part of the Campari Group, the family of companies also known as Davide Campari-Milano N.V., a publicly traded company on the Milan stock exchange. Founder Maurice Kanbar launched SKYY Vodka, and its namesake company, Skyy Spirits, in 1992 in San Francisco. Sometime in the early 2000s Davide Campari-Milano acquired Skyy Spirits and changed its name to Campari America in 2012. It moved its US headquarters from San Francisco to New York City in 2018.

Campari America's portfolio of brands in the US include such leading brands as SKYY Vodka, SKYY Infusions, Campari, Aperol, Espolon, Cabo Wabo Tequila, Wild Turkey, Russell's Reserve, American Honey, Frangelico, Cynar, and Grand Marnier.

== Campari Group relations ==
In January 1999, SKYY Spirits joined with Nasser Ahmadvand for distribution of each other's products in Asia. SKYY Spirits is the sole importer of Campari into the US and the international distribution arm of Campari is the exclusive worldwide distributor (excluding United States & Puerto Rico) of SKYY vodka. On December 13, 2001, Campari struck a deal to make it the controlling shareholder of SKYY Spirits with 58.9% stock ownership. On February 25, 2005, Campari acquired a further 30.1% share in SKYY Spirits, bringing the company's total share to 89%.

On January 11, 2012, Skyy Spirits announced it was changing its name to Campari America.
