= Forty Creek =

Canadian whisky brand

Coordinates: 43°12′9″N 79°34′59″W

- Varieties of whiskies offered at Forty Creek
- Type: Canadian whisky
- Manufacturer: Campari Group
- Origin: Canada
- Introduced: 1992
- Proof (US): 80
- Variants: Barrel Select, Confederation Oak, Copper Pot, Double Barrel Reserve, Forty Creek Cream, Spike,
- Website: www.fortycreekwhisky.com

Forty Creek is a brand of Canadian whisky produced by the Italian beverage company Campari Group. The distillery is located in Grimsby, Ontario, Canada (between Hamilton and Niagara Falls). Forty Creek Barrel Select is the main whisky produced under the Forty Creek brand name.

== Name ==
Forty Creek derives its name from the Forty Mile Creek which is the primary watercourse that runs through Grimsby, Ontario.

== History ==
The brand and its distillery were privately launched in 1992 by John Hall, a first-generation whisky maker and the owner of Kittling Ridge Wines & Spirits, and were purchased (including the ageing inventory) by Campari Group in March 2014 for CA$186 million (US$168.16 million).

Hall launched the brand with two expressions called Forty Creek Barrel Select and Forty Creek Three Grain. In 2007, the first of a series of Forty Creek Special Reserves bottlings were released, which are limited-edition expressions that vary with each lot. In 2012, Forty Creek Copper Pot and Forty Creek Cream were introduced.

Bill Ashburn, Forty Creek's Master Blender, was apart of the distillery since John Hall acquired the plant from Otto Reider in 1992. In September of 2026, Forty Creek announced that Bill Ashburn would retire as master blender in December of that year.

== Varieties ==
=== Barrel Select ===
Forty Creek Barrel Select is a blended Canadian whisky, 40% alcohol (ethanol) by volume, 80 proof. It is made with rye, barley and corn (maize). Each grain is fermented, distilled, and aged separately to produce a "meritage" of single grain whiskies. After distillation using a small-batch, copper pot still, the whiskies are aged separately 6–10 years in small cask 40-gallon white oak barrels of varying toasting levels. Vintage sherry casks round off some of the aged whiskies after they are blended, for an additional six months.

=== Special Reserves ===
Past special reserves at Forty Creek

The production of limited edition Forty Creek whiskies began in 2007. Typically, the bottles are individually numbered, the public has a period of time in which they can reserve a particular bottle number, and the whisky is released in September – followed by a special weekend of events at the distillery.

== Awards and accolades ==
Malt Advocate magazine named John Hall "Pioneer of the Year" in 2007 because of his contribution to new lines of thought and new methods in the world of whisky.

Forty Creek has garnered a number of awards at Spirit ratings competitions and from rating organizations. The awards include:

- Tier 1 Status – Proof66 Liquor Ratings Aggregator.
- Double Gold Medal – San Francisco World Spirits Competition 2006.
- Gold Medal – World Selection (Monde Selection), Brussels, Belgium
- Gold Medal – 2010 International Review of Spirits, Chicago
- Gold Medal – 2011 International Review of Spirits, Chicago
- Gold Medal – 2012 International Review of Spirits, Chicago – Rating: 90 points (Exceptional)
- 5 Gold Medals – San Francisco World Spirits Competition 2013

In the 2008 Icons of Whisky Canada competition held by London England's Whisky Magazine, John K. Hall was awarded Ambassador of the Year and Kittling Ridge was deemed Best Distiller.
