= Crodino =

Non-alcoholic drink

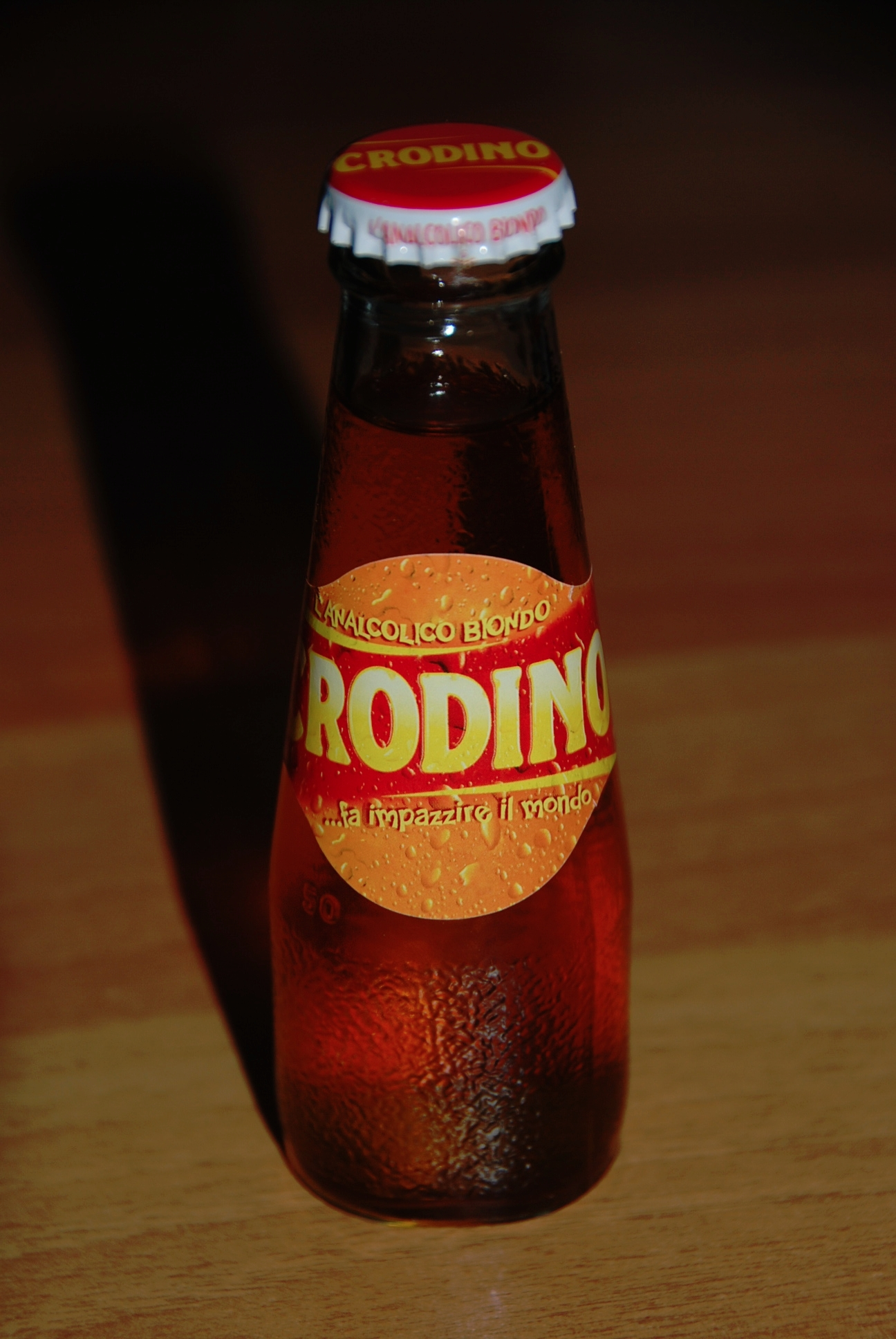
Bottle of Crodino

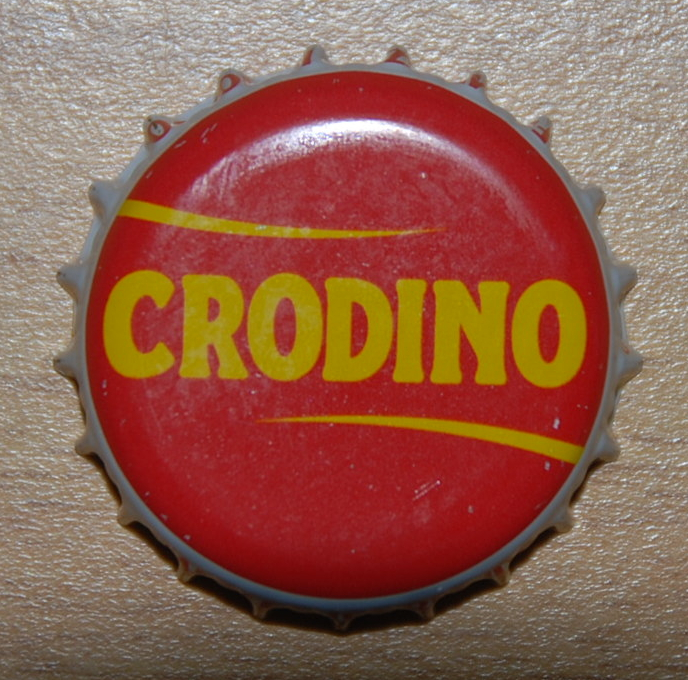
Crown cap of Crodino

Crodino is a non-alcoholic bitter aperitif, produced since 1965. Since 1995 it has been manufactured by Gruppo Campari. It is an orange-coloured drink made from herbal extracts and sugar and sold in 10 centilitres (3.5 imp fl oz; 3.4 US fl oz) bottles. It is primarily consumed in Italy and other European countries.

It is closed with a crown cap.

Distribution started in the UK in 2021, and in France in 2022. The expansion to new markets was made possible thanks to the growing popularity of spritz worldwide and its bitter flavor. In 2023, production was moved out of Crodo.

== Name ==
The name Crodino derives from a comune in the province of Verbano-Cusio-Ossola, Crodo, Italy, where the beverage was bottled from 1964 to 2023.

== Cocktails ==
It is used to make Sixteen Rum, a cocktail of Piedmont, consisting of rum, vermouth (Martini rosso or other), Crodino, and lemon juice or a lemon slice. Typical portions are about half a shot each of rum and vermouth (¾ oz or 25 ml), and a full bottle (100 ml) of Crodino.
