= Rosa Anna Garavoglia =

- Born: Rosa Anna Magno; 8 March 1933
- Died: 22 November 2016 (aged 83)
- Known for: Owner of 51% of Gruppo Campari
- Spouse: Domenico Garavoglia (deceased)
- Children: 3, including Luca Garavoglia

Rosa Anna Garavoglia (née Magno; 8 March 1933 – 22 November 2016) was an Italian billionaire, the owner of 51% of Gruppo Campari.

She owned 51% of Gruppo Campari, the largest spirits manufacturer in Italy and sixth largest in the world. In May 2015, her net worth was estimated at $3.2 billion.

She inherited her Campari shares from her late husband, Domenico. They had three children Luca Garavoglia, Alessandra Garavoglia, and Maddalena Garavoglia. Luca Garavoglia is chairman of Gruppo Campari.

== Death ==
She died on 22 November 2016, aged 83, and it was announced that her son Luca Garavoglia, chairman of Campari "would now assume control of Alicros, which owns 51 percent of Campari's equity, and an even greater share of voting rights".
