= Black Velvet (whisky) =

Canadian whisky brand

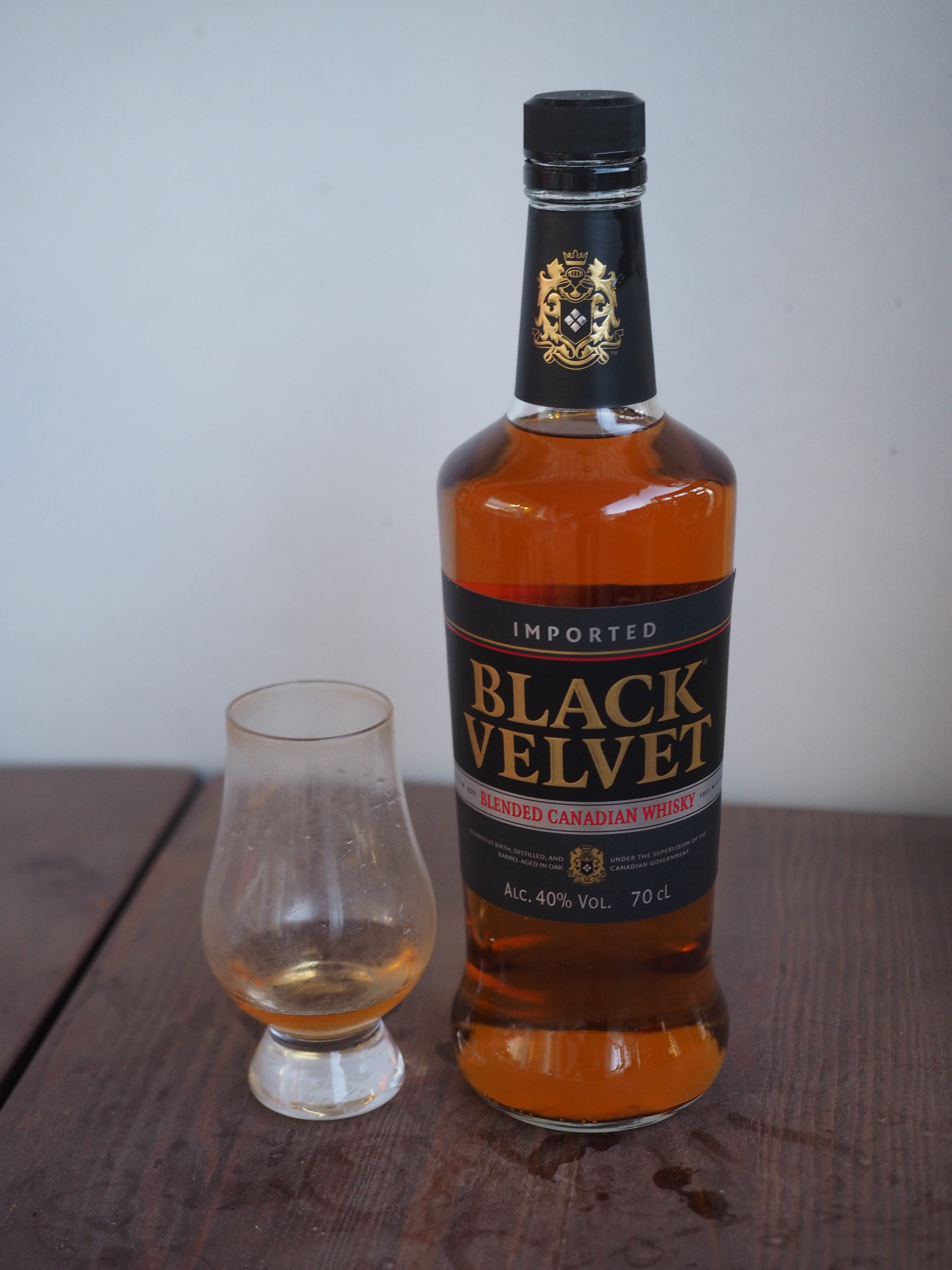
- Black Velvet Canadian Whisky
- Type: Canadian whisky
- Manufacturer: Heaven Hill
- Origin: Valleyfield, Quebec, Canada
- Alcohol by volume: 40.00%
- Proof (US): 80

Black Velvet Whisky is a Canadian whisky brand owned by Heaven Hill and produced in the Black Velvet Distillery in Lethbridge, Alberta, Canada.

Black Velvet was originally produced at Schenley Industries in Valleyfield, Quebec, Canada. Schenley's Black Velvet DeLuxe was the only liquor available to submarine officers at Midway in World War II, where it was held in low regard and known as "Schenley's Black Death".

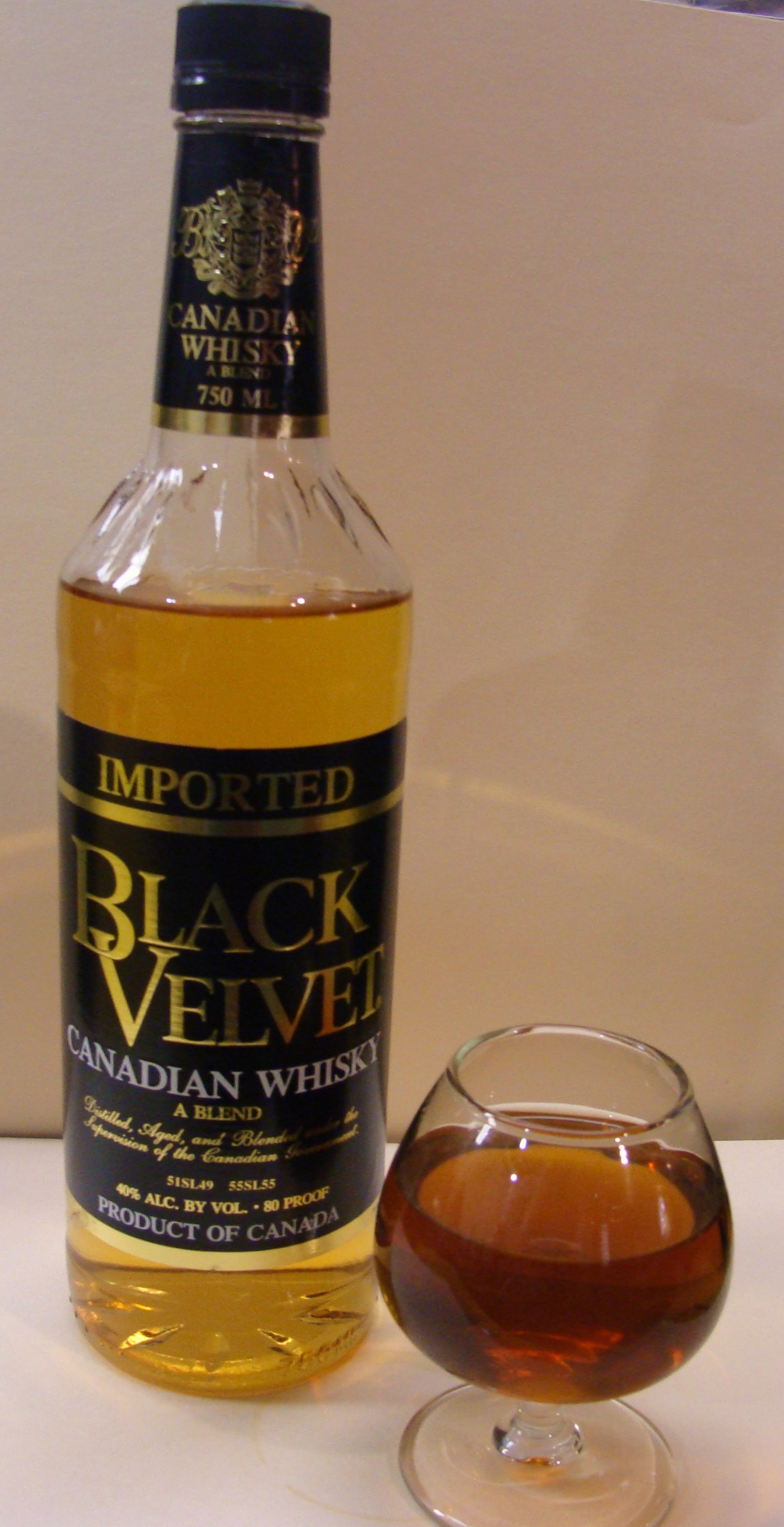
Bottle of Black Velvet

Original owner Heublein was sold to Grand Metropolitan in 1987. Grand Metropolitan and Guinness merged in 1997 to form Diageo.

In 1999 the distillery was sold by Diageo to Canandaigua Brands. They owned the distillery and brand for 20 years before selling them, along with an inventory of maturing whisky, to Heaven Hill for $266 million (USD).

Originally called "Black Label", the name was changed to "Black Velvet" at the suggestion of the Master Distiller Jack Napier in the late 1940's. This was because he thought the whiskey had a velvety taste and smoothness.

Black Velvet produces four expressions which are primarily sold on the export market to the United States: Black Velvet Original, Black Velvet Reserve (aged eight years), Black Velvet Toasted Caramel (introduced in 2012), and Black Velvet Cinnamon Rush (introduced in 2013).
