= Wild Turkey (bourbon) =

Brand of Kentucky straight bourbon whiskey

Coordinates: 38°02′19″N 84°51′02″W

Wild Turkey Bourbon whiskey

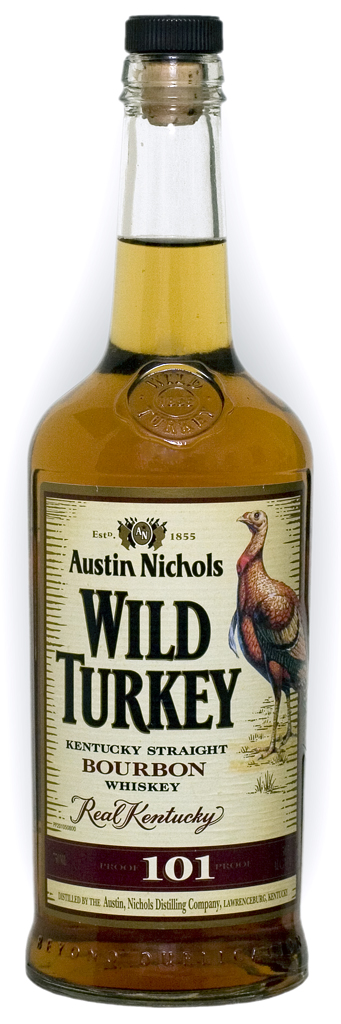
- Wild Turkey 101
- Type: Bourbon whiskey
- Origin: Lawrenceburg, Kentucky, United States
- Introduced: 1940
- Proof (US): 80, 81, 86.8, 101, 108.2
- Variants: Wild Turkey 101; Wild Turkey 81; Wild Turkey Rye; American Honey; Wild Turkey Rare Breed; Russell's Reserve 6, 10, 13, 15; Russell's Reserve Single Barrel; Kentucky Spirit; Wild Turkey 86.8; Wild Turkey 8, 12
- Website: wildturkeybourbon.com

Uncorking and pouring
Uncorking, first pour, and re-corking of a 70cc bottle of Wild Turkey 101. During the pour, glugging can be heard.

Wild Turkey is a brand of Kentucky straight bourbon whiskey produced at Wild Turkey Distillery, in Lawrenceburg, Kentucky by the Campari Group.

The distillery offers tours and is part of the American Whiskey Trail and the Kentucky Bourbon Trail.

== History ==
In 1891, Thomas Ripy built the Old Hickory Distillery in Tyrone, Kentucky, near Lawrenceburg, on the former site of the Old Moore Distillery. After Prohibition, the Ripy family (Thomas had died in 1902) rebuilt the distillery and began to again produce bourbon. The Ripys sold the bourbon produced at this distillery to various wholesalers who bottled bourbon under their own brands. Austin Nichols was one of these wholesalers.

The "Wild Turkey" brand is said to have arisen after an Austin Nichols executive, Thomas McCarthy, took some warehouse samples on a wild turkey hunting trip in 1940. The bourbon proved so popular among his friends they continued to ask him for "that wild turkey bourbon." Austin Nichols began to bottle Wild Turkey in 1942.

The Ripys were bought out in 1949 by Robert and Alvin Gould.

For the next three decades, Austin Nichols remained a non-distiller producer—bottling bourbon purchased on the open market under the Wild Turkey brand. Much of this whiskey was purchased from the Ripys/Gould distillery in Tyrone. In 1971, Austin Nichols purchased the facility, then known as the Boulevard Distillery, and changed the name to the Wild Turkey Distillery.

In 1980, the distillery and the Wild Turkey brand were purchased by Pernod Ricard.

On May 9, 2000, a fire destroyed a seven-story aging warehouse at the company in Anderson County, Kentucky. It contained more than 17,000 wooden barrels of whiskey. Burning whiskey flowed from the warehouse, setting the surrounding woods on fire. Firefighters saved Lawrenceburg's water treatment plant from destruction. However, an estimated 20% of the whiskey flowed into the Kentucky River. The river contamination required the temporary shutdown of the water treatment plant. Officials ordered water usage restrictions. Businesses and schools were closed because of the water shortage. The alcohol spill also depleted the oxygen in the river, killing an estimated 228,000 fish along a 66-mile stretch. The EPA and the Coast Guard's Gulf Strike Team aerated the river using equipment mounted on barges. The company paid $256,000 to the Kentucky Department of Fish and Wildlife in an effort to restore the fish population in the river.

In 2009, the Campari Group acquired the distillery and the Wild Turkey brand from Pernod Ricard.

In 2011, Wild Turkey began to be distilled at a newly constructed facility near the old distillery. The new distillery sits where the old bottling facility was previously located.

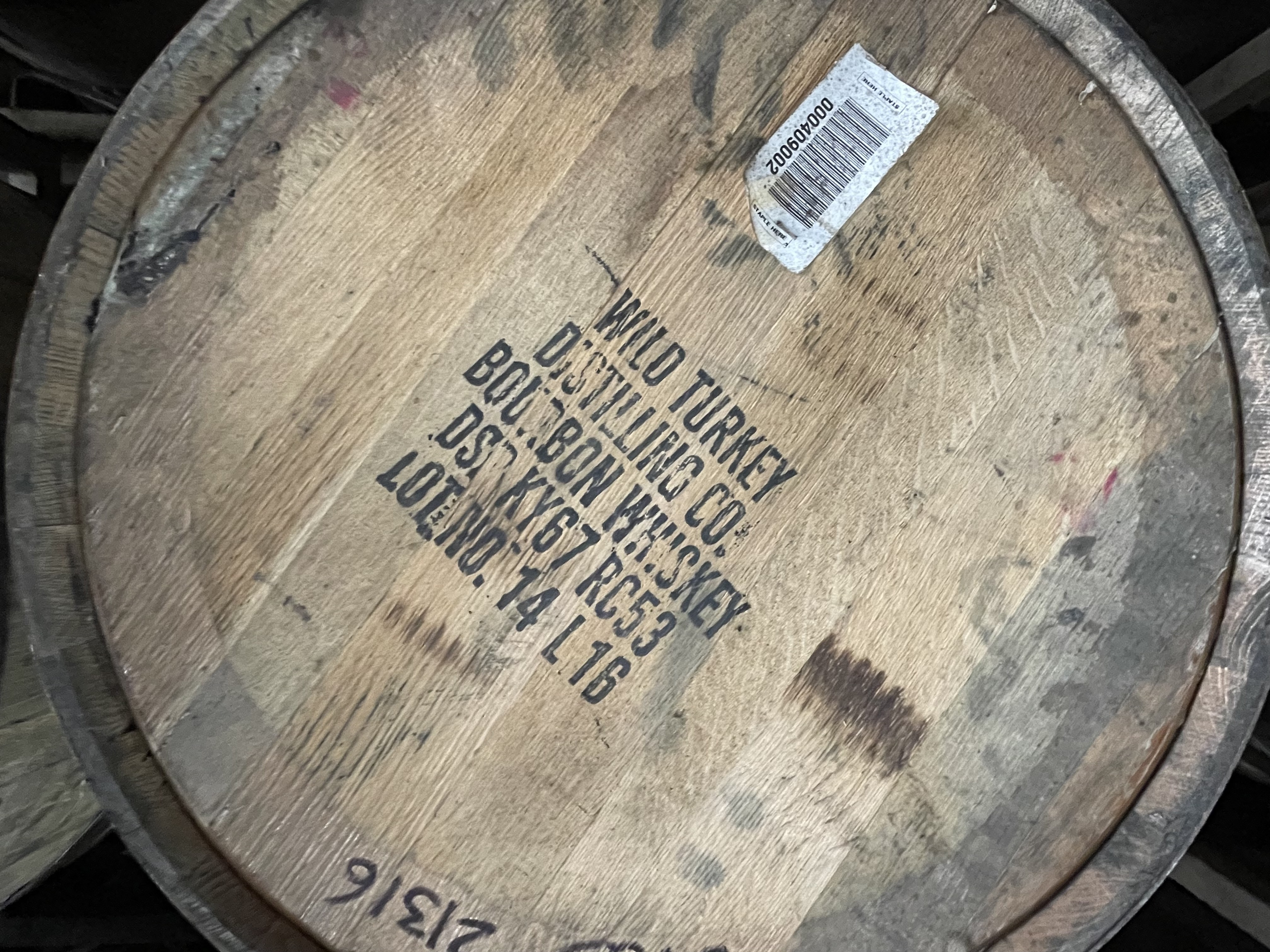
A Wild Turkey whiskey barrel

In 2013, Campari opened a new bottling facility at the Wild Turkey Distillery. For the previous 13 years Wild Turkey had been bottled offsite in Indiana and, later, Arkansas. In addition to the Wild Turkey products, Campari's SKYY vodka is also bottled there after being shipped from the Illinois distillery.

== Production ==
Wild Turkey uses a mash consisting of a relatively lower percentage of corn than most bourbons and attempts are made to counteract the alkaline environment of the company's limestone-rich water. Additionally, the raw whiskey is distilled to about 55% alcohol by volume, much lower than the legally allowed maximum to be considered bourbon. Barrels used to be rotated in open houses (Rick House) to allow more even maturation, being aged until at least one third of the contents are lost to evaporation before they are considered for bottling.

== Products ==
The Lawrenceburg distillery bottles its bourbon and rye under the brands of "Wild Turkey" and "Russell's Reserve".

=== Awards ===
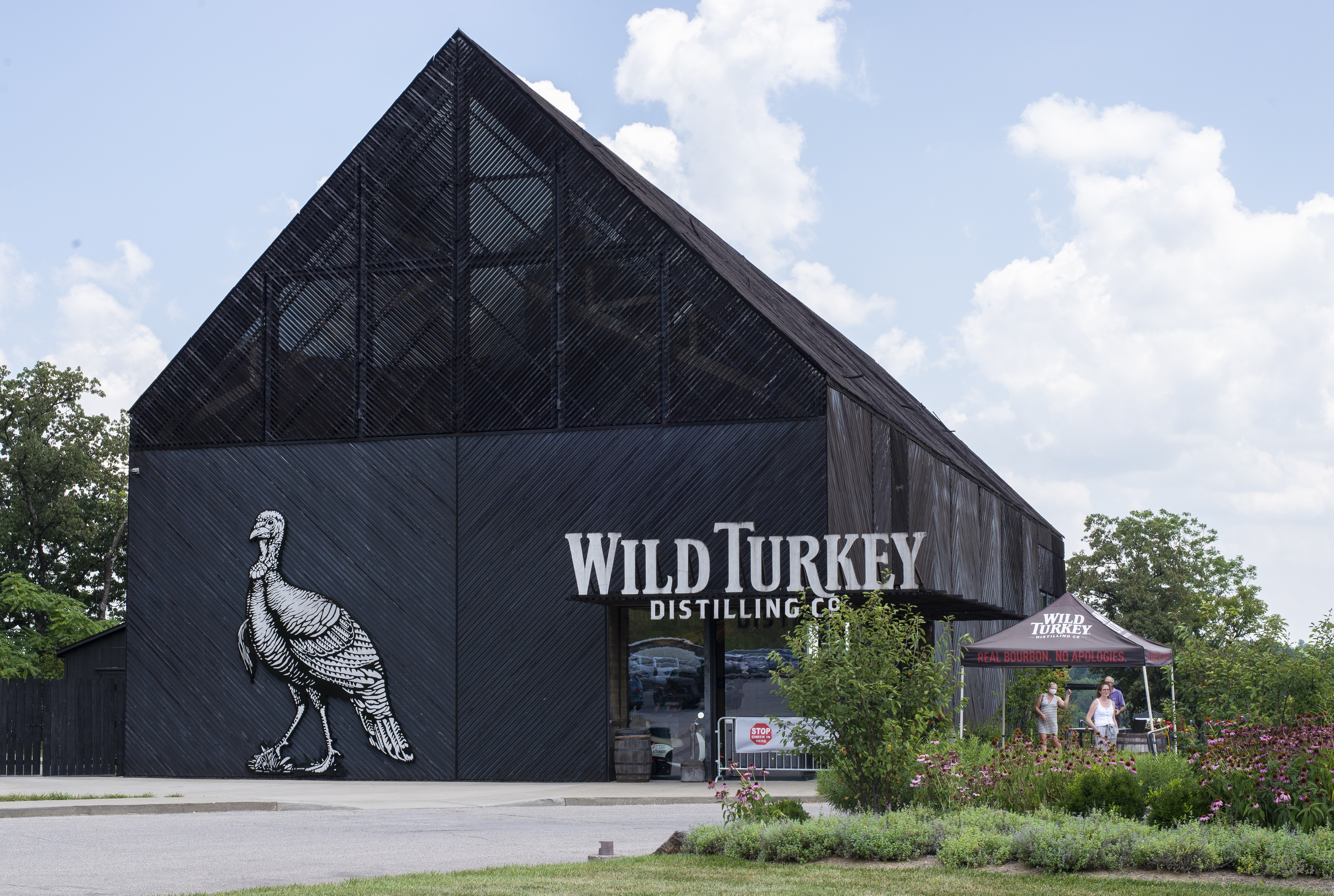
The visitor center at the Wild Turkey distillery

In 2012, Wild Turkey 101 earned an 'Editor's Choice' award from Whisky Magazine. An aggregator from various "expert" body reviews places the 101 Single Barrel in the 97th percentile of all rated bourbons.

== Advertising campaigns ==
=== "Give 'em the Bird" ===
In 2011, an advertisement video called "Give 'em the Bird" was featured on the product's web site, Facebook page, and YouTube page that prominently included a middle finger gesture and referred to other (non-existing) advertising videos featuring a nun and an adult blow-up doll.

In August 2011, the review board of the Distilled Spirits Council of the United States (DISCUS), of which Campari USA is a member, ruled that the advertisement violated the council's code of ethical practices and said that "the gesture is indecent and the advertisement fails to meet contemporary standards of good taste". According to DISCUS, the company disagreed with the board's interpretation but agreed to withdraw the advertisement.

Since then, the company has continued to use the "Give 'em the Bird" slogan and middle finger gesturing in additional advertising and promotional activities. In November 2012, Jimmy Russell, the Wild Turkey Master Distiller, publicly called for U.S. President Barack Obama to "Give us the bird", as a way of offering to provide a home for that year's White House Thanksgiving Day turkey (which is traditionally "pardoned" by the president) – saying the turkey would become the brand's official "spokesbird".

=== Matthew McConaughey ===
In 2016, Matthew McConaughey was hired as creative director and celebrity spokesman for Wild Turkey's latest campaign, to bring in more women and international customers.
