= Cabo Wabo =

American nightclub and restaurant chain

Coordinates: 22°53′1″N 109°54′48″W

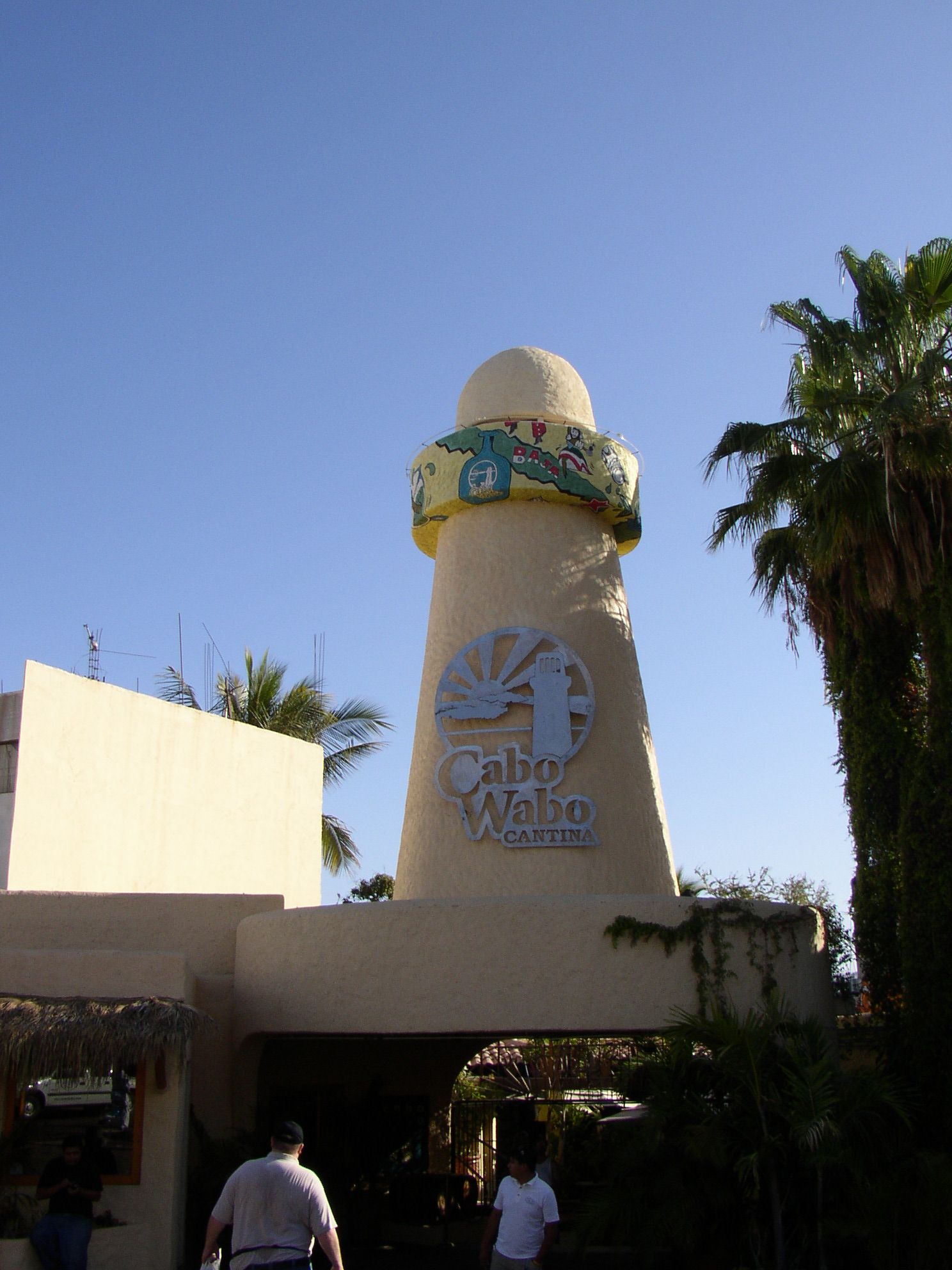
- View of Hagar's Cabo Wabo restaurant/nightclub in Cabo San Lucas, Mexico
- Type: Private
- Industry: Nightclub; Restaurant; Bar
- Founder: Sammy Hagar, Jorge Viaña
- Headquarters: United States
- Products: Food, alcohol
- Website: cabowabocantina.com

Cabo Wabo is a nightclub, restaurant and bar company founded in 1990 by American rock musicians Sammy Hagar, Eddie Van Halen, Alex Van Halen, and Michael Anthony (the band Van Halen's lineup from 1985–1996), alongside business partner Jorge Viaña. Located in Cabo San Lucas, Baja California Sur, Mexico. Hagar bought out the rest of the Van Halen members in 1996 after several years of bad management. A second location is on the Las Vegas Strip. There were also locations in Lake Tahoe, Fresno, Hollywood, and New York City. The name is also used for the bar's signature brand of tequila.

== Cantina ==
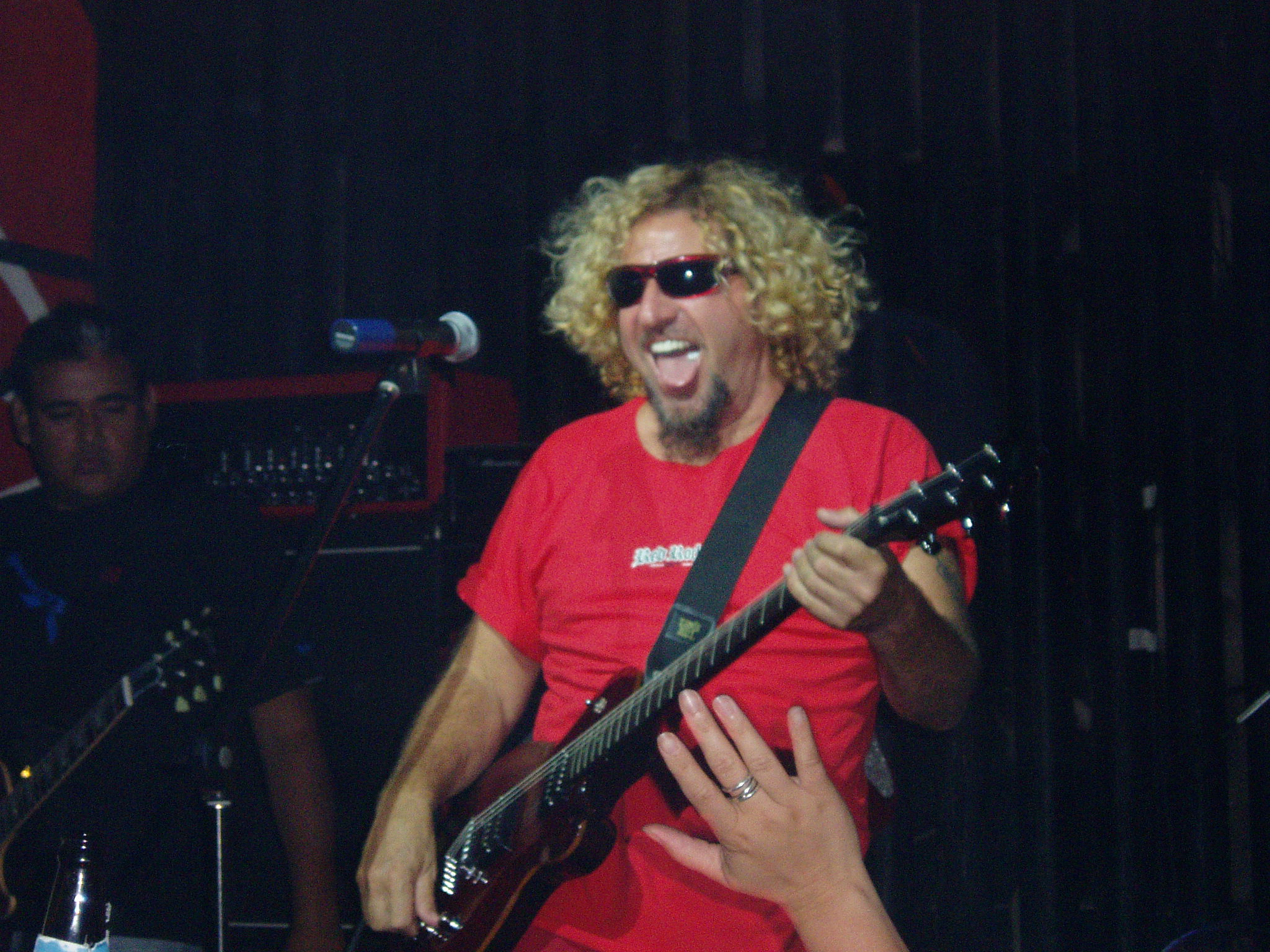
Hagar performing at the Cabo Wabo

Hagar, who already had a successful music career, first visited the Mexican town of Cabo San Lucas in the early 1980s, before joining Van Halen in July 1985 after the departure of their founding singer, David Lee Roth. Seeking a place for himself and his friends to relax and play music, Hagar, and his long time friend, Marco Monroy, partnered up with fellow Van Halen members Michael Anthony and Edward and Alex Van Halen and opened a large bar, restaurant, and performance space named after the band's 1988 song "Cabo Wabo."

Launched in April 1990, the cantina was initially a financial failure, leading Hagar to buy out his bandmates. Under new management, the bar became popular with both locals and tourists as the town quickly grew into a major resort. In 2004, after plans fell through to open in Las Vegas, Hagar opened a second location in the basement of the historic Harvey's casino on the south shore of Lake Tahoe. However, that location has since closed. A third location was opened in Fresno, California in 2008, but had its license pulled by Hagar at the beginning of 2009. Cabo Wabo Las Vegas opened in The Miracle Mile shopping center at Planet Hollywood in November 2009. The club typically attracts an older adult clientele with its mostly rock music selection.

Hagar claims he coined the name after watching a man walk unsteadily along a local beach after a heavy night's partying. Using the town's nickname, Cabo (which means "cape" in Spanish), and shortening "wobble" to "wabo" he said of the man that he was doing the "Cabo wabo." Hagar later used the phrase in his lyrics and title for the Van Halen song.

== Tequila ==
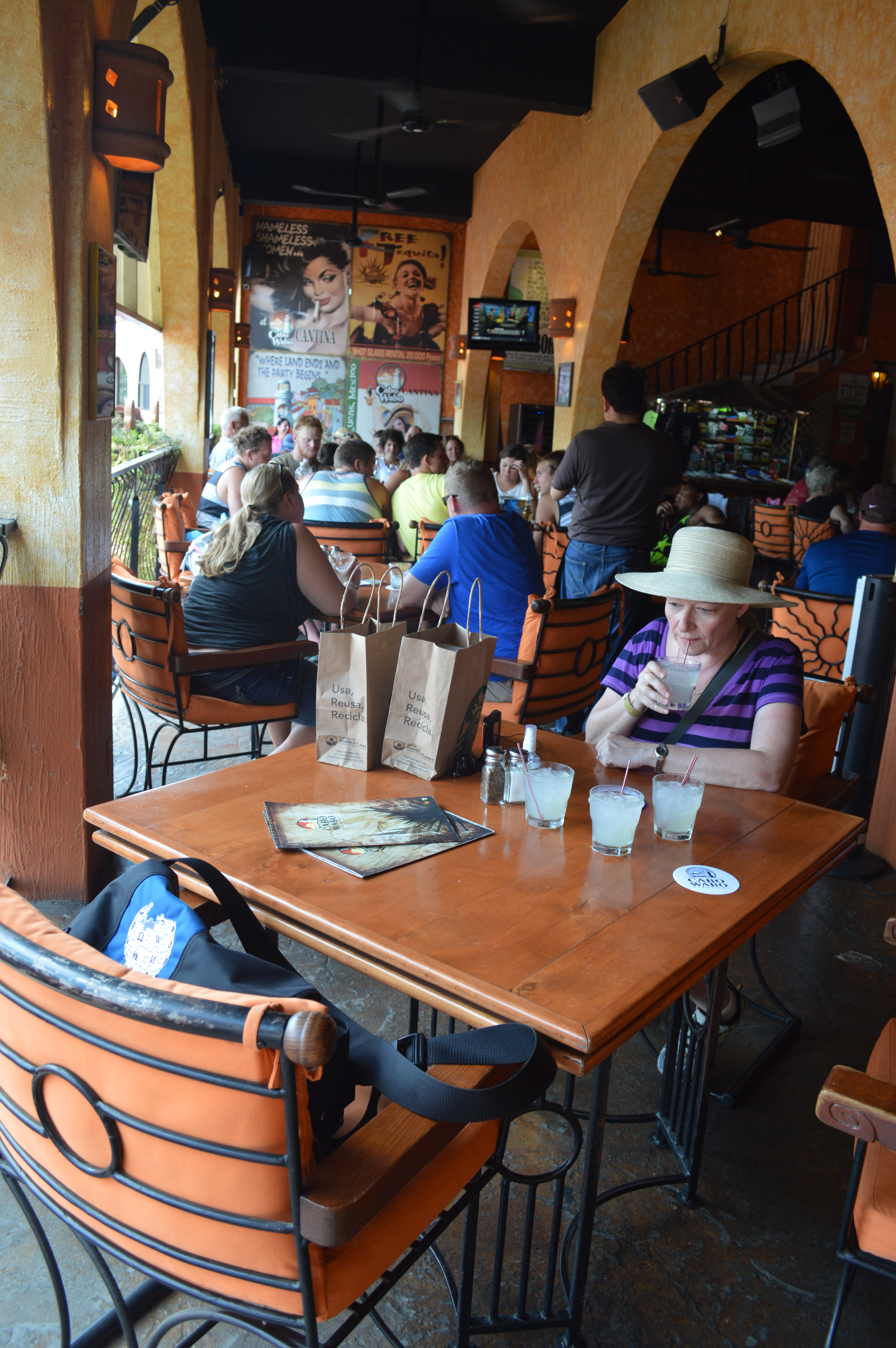
Patrons drinking in a portion of the cantina

In the late 1990s, Hagar began selling his patrons a house brand of hand-made tequila he commissioned from a family-owned distillery in the state of Jalisco. In 1999, Winston 'Win' Wilson of Wilson-Daniels, a fine wine and liquor importer and distributor from Napa Valley began to import the tequila into the United States. An instant success, sales rose from 37,000 cases the first year to 140,000 cases in 2006, making it the second-best selling premium tequila in the United States.

Several of the Cabo Wabo offerings have performed quite well at international spirit ratings competitions. The añejo offering received three silver, one gold and one double gold medal at the San Francisco World Spirits Competition between 2008 and 2012. Its reposado tequila received a score of 92 from the 2008 Beverage Testing Institute. The blanco tequila received a gold medal at the 2020 New York International Spirits Competition.

In May 2007 it was announced that Hagar would sell an 80% interest in Cabo Wabo Tequila to Gruppo Campari, the world's sixth-largest spirits company, for $80 million. Skyy Spirits of San Francisco, a vodka producer and subsidiary of Gruppo Campari, planned to market Cabo Wabo globally, with continued participation by Hagar. Gerry Ruvo, president and chief executive of Skyy Spirits, said, "Sammy has done a fantastic job building the brand, so we are going to obviously spend time with him and work with him to continue our efforts to take the brand to an even larger level, both here in the US and, more important, globally." Ruvo said Great Britain, Spain, Australia, Southeast Asia, Japan, Germany and Italy are considered key expansion markets for tequila.

== Logo ==
In 1990, the brand introduced an original logo for the cantina. The logo for the tequila has since changed. Its newest iteration occurred in 2009 with a minimalist design featuring the letters in a weathered western font of silver.

== See also ==
- A Fistful of Alice
