= Cinzano =

Italian brand of vermouth

- Product type: Vermouth
- Current owner: Caffo 1915 Group
- Country: Italy
- Introduced: 1757; 269 years ago
- Markets: Available worldwide
- Previous owners: Cinzano International S.A. Grand Metropolitan (1992–1997); Diageo (1997–1999); Campari Group (1999–2025)
- Website: cinzano.com

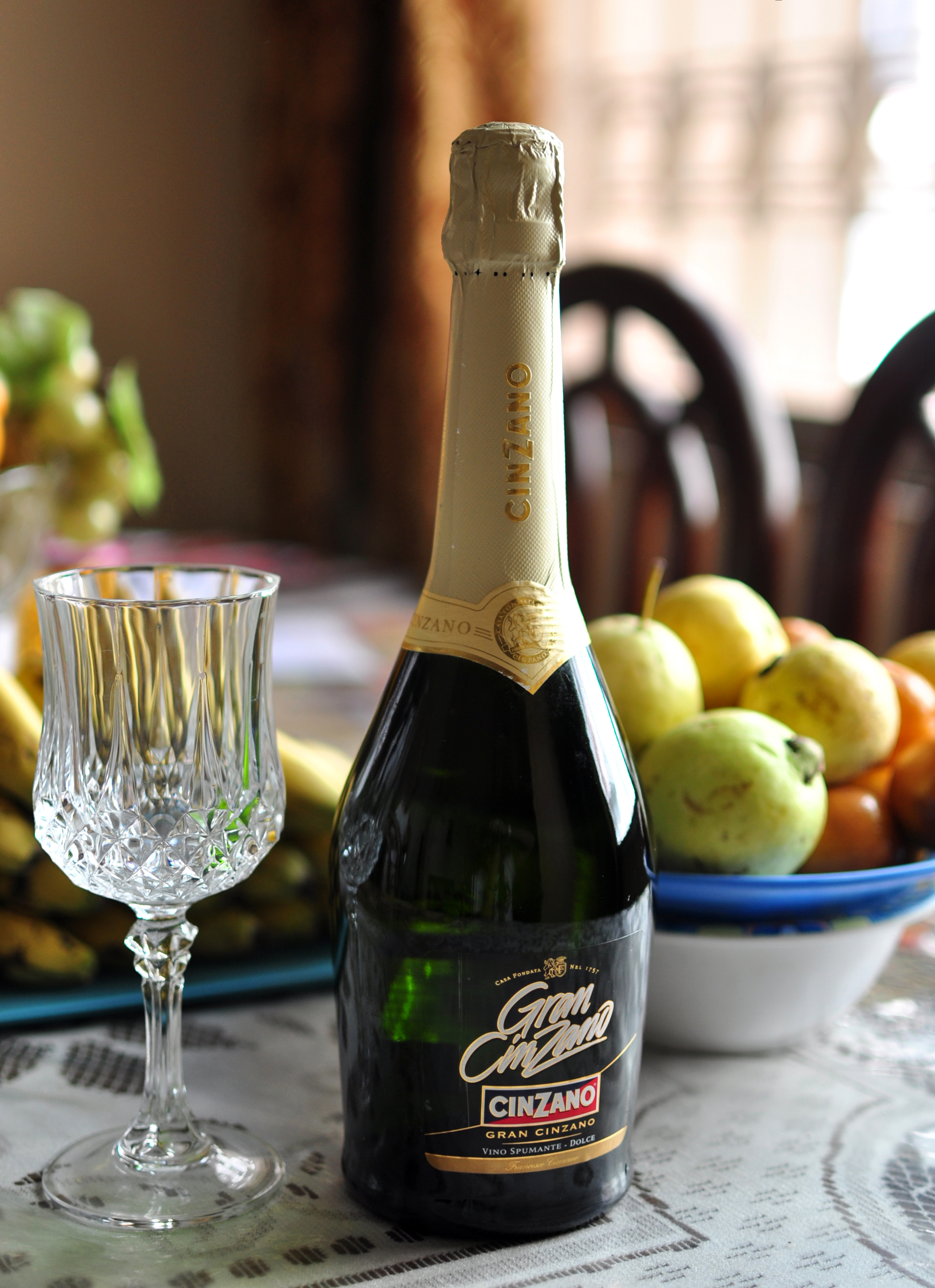
Gran Cinzano

Cinzano (IPA: [tʃinˈtsaːno]) is an Italian brand of vermouth, a brand owned by Gruppo Caffo 1915.

== History ==
Cinzano vermouths date back to 1757 and the Turin herbal shop of two brothers, Giovanni Giacomo and Carlo Stefano Cinzano, who created a new "vermouth rosso" (red vermouth) using "aromatic plants from the Italian Alps in a [still-secret] recipe combining 35 ingredients (including marjoram, thyme, and yarrow)". What became known as the "vermouth of Turin" proved popular with the bourgeoisie of Turin and, later, Casanova.

Cinzano Bianco followed, based on a different combination of herbs that included artemisia (wormwood), cinnamon, cloves, citrus and gentian; it was followed by an Extra Dry version. Exports began in the 1890s, to Argentina, Brazil and the United States, among others. In Paris in 1913, Cinzano was the first product to be advertised with a neon sign on its roof.

Cinzano remained a family-run business until 1985. Beginning that year, the Marone family, Turin industrialists, began to sell shares in the business, culminating in 1992 with an agreement to turn Cinzano International S.A. entirely over to International Distillers & Vintners, a wholly owned subsidiary of Grand Metropolitan. At the time of its sale, Cinzano's share of the vermouth market in Europe was measured in the low single digits, sales that placed it a distant second to Martini.

As a result of a 1997 merger, Grand Metropolitan became Diageo; two years later, Diageo sold Cinzano to the privately held Gruppo Campari.

The Cinzano cycling team had a central role in the film Breaking Away.

== Versions ==
It comes in four versions:

- Cinzano Rosso, which is amber-coloured;
- Cinzano Bianco, which is white and drier than Rosso, yet still considered a sweet vermouth;
- Cinzano Extra Dry, a dry vermouth;
- Cinzano Rosé, the newest of the four, rosy-coloured with orange highlights.

== Advertising ==
Cinzano was well known in Britain for its humorous television advertisements featuring Leonard Rossiter and Joan Collins. One of these featured the pair on a plane journey, with Rossiter accidentally hitting the recline switch on Collins' chair, causing her to spill a glass of the drink over herself. It also featured as a Sterling Cooper–promoted brand in the series Mad Men.

== See also ==
- List of Italian companies
