= Canadian whisky =

Whisky produced in Canada

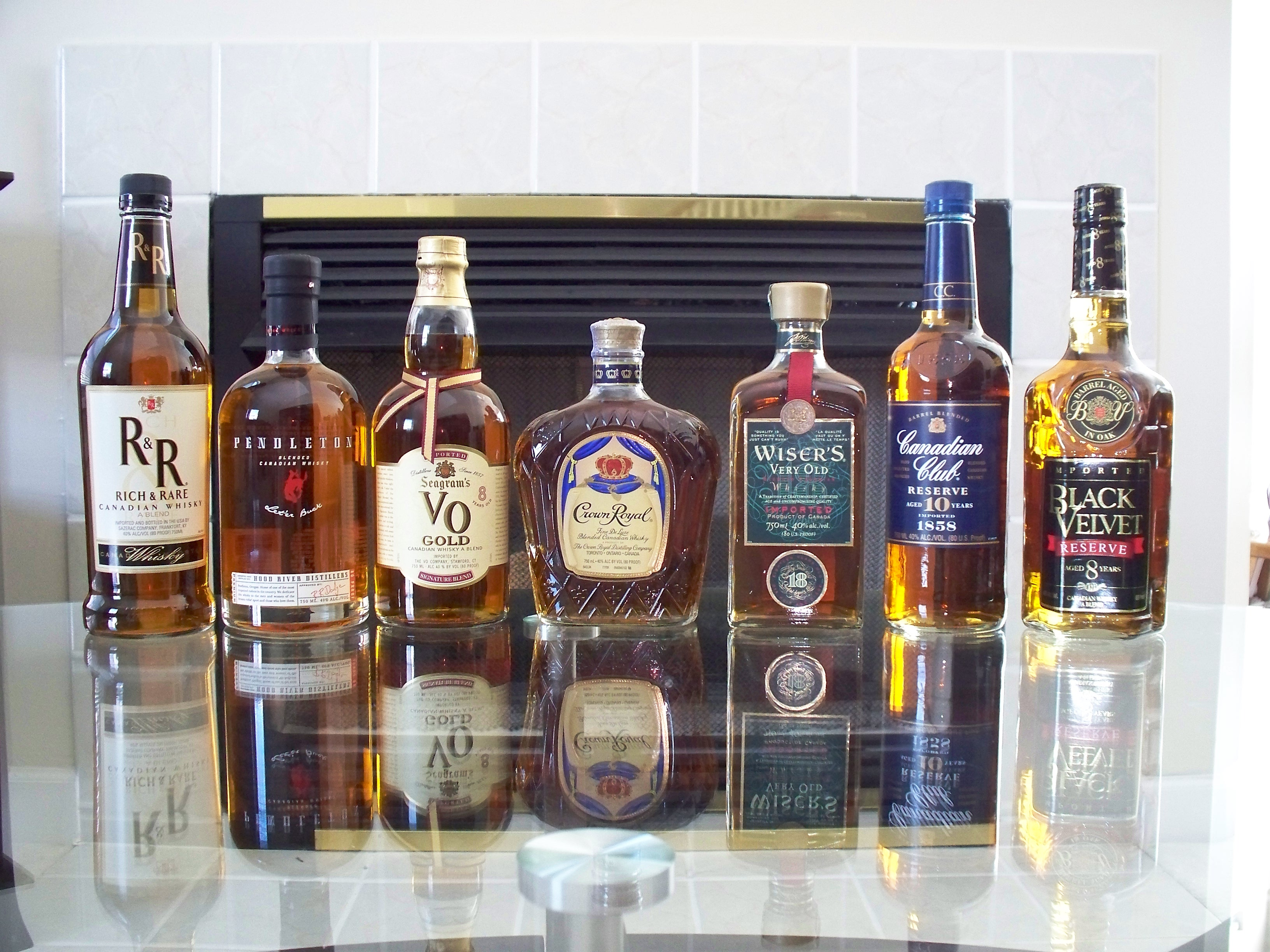
A variety of Canadian whiskies

Canadian whisky is a type of whisky produced in Canada. Most Canadian whiskies are blended whiskies consisting of a mix of different whisky styles, and are typically lighter and smoother than other whisky styles. While most Canadian whiskies are based predominantly on corn-based whiskies, Canadian distillers have long included rye-based whisky for flavour; in Canadian law the terms Canadian whisky and rye whisky are interchangeable to refer to the same product, even when it is made with only a small amount of rye spirits.

== Characteristics ==
Historically, in Canada, corn-based whisky that had some rye grain added to the mash bill to give it more flavour came to be called "rye".

The regulations under Canada's Food and Drugs Act stipulate the minimum conditions that must be met to label a product as "Canadian whisky" or "Canadian rye whisky" (or "rye whisky")—these are also upheld internationally through geographical indication agreements. These regulations state that whisky must "be mashed, distilled and aged in Canada", "be aged in small wood vessels for not less than three years", "contain not less than 40 per cent alcohol by volume" and "may contain caramel and flavouring". Within these parameters Canadian whiskies can vary considerably, especially with the allowance of "flavouring"—though the additional requirement that they "possess the aroma, taste and character generally attributed to Canadian whisky" can act as a limiting factor.

Canadian whiskies are most typically blends of whiskies made from a single grain, principally corn and rye, but also sometimes wheat or barley. Mash bills of multiple grains may also be used for some flavouring whiskies. The availability of inexpensive American corn, with its higher proportion of usable starches relative to other cereal grains, has led it to be most typically used to create base whiskies to which flavouring whiskies are blended in. Exceptions to this include the Highwood Distillery, which specializes in using wheat, and the Alberta Distillers, which developed its own proprietary yeast strain that specializes in distilling rye. The flavouring whiskies are most typically rye whiskies, blended into the product to add most of its flavour and aroma. While Canadian whisky may be labelled as a "rye whisky" this blending technique necessitates only a small percentage (such as 10%) of rye to create the flavour, whereas much more rye would be required if it were added to a mash bill alongside the more readily distilled corn.

The base whiskies are distilled to between 180 and 190 proof which results in few congener by-products (such as fusel alcohol, aldehydes, esters, etc.) and creates a lighter taste. By comparison, an American whisky distilled any higher than 160 proof is labelled as "light whiskey". The flavouring whiskies are distilled to a lower proof so that they retain more of the grain's flavour. The relative lightness created by the use of base whiskies makes Canadian whisky useful for mixing into cocktails and highballs. The minimum three-year aging in small wood barrels applies to all whiskies used in the blend. As the regulations do not limit the specific type of wood that must be used, a variety of flavours can be achieved by blending whiskies aged in different types of barrels. In addition to new wood barrels, charred or uncharred, flavour can be added by aging whiskies in previously used bourbon or fortified wine barrels for different lengths of time.

== History ==
In the 18th and early 19th centuries, gristmills distilled surplus grains to avoid spoilage. Most of these early whiskies would have been rough, mostly unaged wheat whiskey. Distilling methods and technologies were brought to Canada by American and European immigrants with experience in distilling wheat and rye. This early whisky from improvised stills, often with the grains closest to spoilage, was produced with various, uncontrolled proofs and was consumed, unaged, by the local market. (Note: Equivalent to moonshine.) While most distilling capacity was taken up producing rum, a result of Atlantic Canada's position in the British sugar trade, the first commercial scale production of whisky in Canada began in 1801 when John Molson purchased a copper pot still, previously used to produce rum, in Montreal. With his son Thomas Molson, and eventually partner James Morton, the Molsons operated a distillery in Montreal and Kingston and were the first in Canada to export whisky, benefiting from Napoleonic Wars' disruption in supplying French wine and brandies to England.

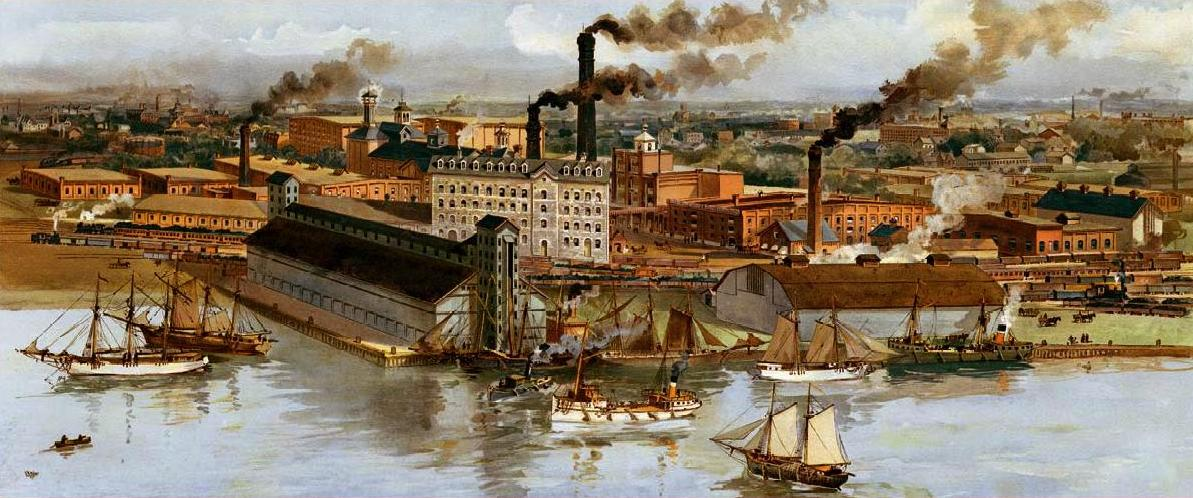
The Gooderham and Worts buildings, c. 19th century. In the 1860s, the distillery became the world's largest producer of whisky.

Gooderham and Worts began producing whisky in 1837 in Toronto as a side business to their wheat milling but surpassed Molson's production by the 1850s as it expanded their operations with a new distillery in what would become the Distillery District. Henry Corby started distilling whisky as a side business from his gristmill in 1859 in what became known as Corbyville and Joseph Seagram began working in his father-in-law's Waterloo flour mill and distillery in 1864, which he would eventually purchase in 1883. Meanwhile, Americans Hiram Walker and J.P. Wiser moved to Canada: Walker to Windsor in 1858 to open a flour mill and distillery and Wiser to Prescott in 1857 to work at his uncle's distillery where he introduced a rye whisky and was successful enough to buy the distillery five years later. The disruption of American Civil War created an export opportunity for Canadian-made whiskies and their quality, particularly those from Walker and Wiser who had already begun the practice of aging their whiskies, sustained that market even after post-war tariffs were introduced. In the 1880s, Canada's National Policy placed high tariffs on foreign alcoholic products as whisky began to be sold in bottles and the federal government instituted a bottled in bond program that provided certification of the time a whisky spent aging and allowed deferral of taxes for that period, which encouraged aging. In 1890 Canada became the first country to enact an aging law for whiskies, requiring them to be aged at least two years. The growing temperance movement culminated in prohibition in 1916 and distilleries had to either specialize in the export market or switch to alternative products, like industrial alcohols which were in demand in support of the war effort.

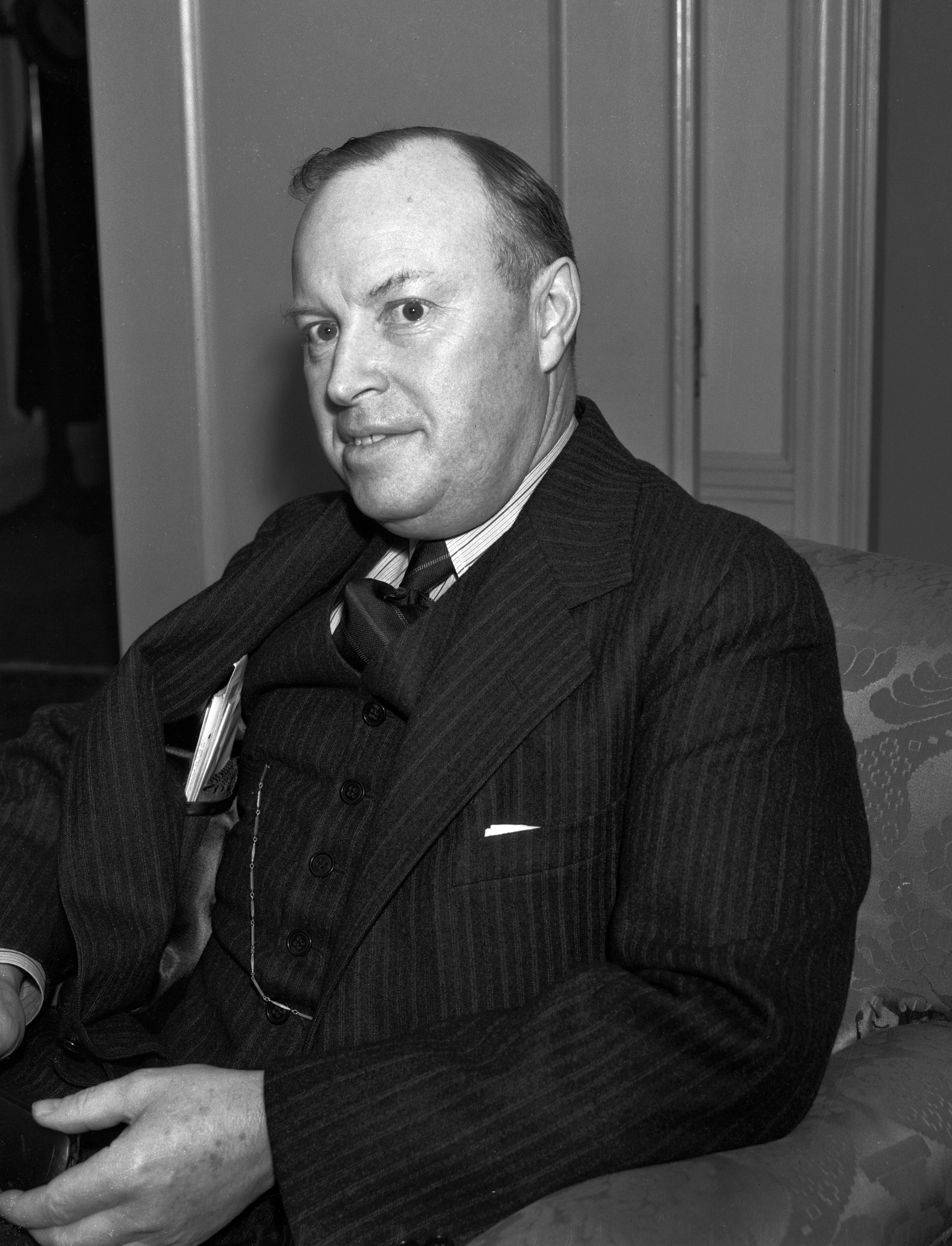
Harry Hatch was a Canadian industrialist, who consolidated several Canadian distilleries in the early 20th century.

With the deferred revenue and storage costs of the Aging Law acting as a barrier to new entrants and the reduced market due to prohibition, consolidation of Canadian whisky had begun. Henry Corby Jr. modernized and expanded upon his father's distillery and sold it, in 1905, to businessman Mortimer Davis who also purchased the Wiser distillery, in 1918, from the heirs of J.P. Wiser. Davis's salesman Harry Hatch spent time promoting the Corby and Wiser brands and developing a distribution network in the United States which held together as Canadian prohibition ended and American prohibition began. After Hatch's falling out with Davis, Hatch purchased the struggling Gooderham and Worts in 1923 and switched out Davis's whisky for his. Hatch was successful enough to be able to also purchase the Walker distillery, and the popular Canadian Club brand, from Hiram's grandsons in 1926. While American prohibition created risk and instability in the Canadian whisky industry, some benefited from purchasing unused American distillation equipment and from sales to exporters (nominally to foreign countries like Saint Pierre and Miquelon, though actually to bootleggers to the United States). Along with Hatch, the Bronfman family was able to profit from making whisky destined for the US during prohibition, and were able to open a distillery in LaSalle, Quebec, and merge their company, in 1928, with Seagram's which had struggled with transitioning to the prohibition marketplace. Samuel Bronfman became president of the company and, with his dominant personality, began a strategy of increasing their capacity and aging whiskies in anticipation of the end of prohibition. When that did occur, in 1933, Seagram's was in a position to quickly expand; they purchased the British Columbia Distilling Company from the Riefel family in 1935, as well as several American distilleries and introduced new brands, one of them being Crown Royal, in 1939, which eventually became one of the best-selling Canadian whiskies.

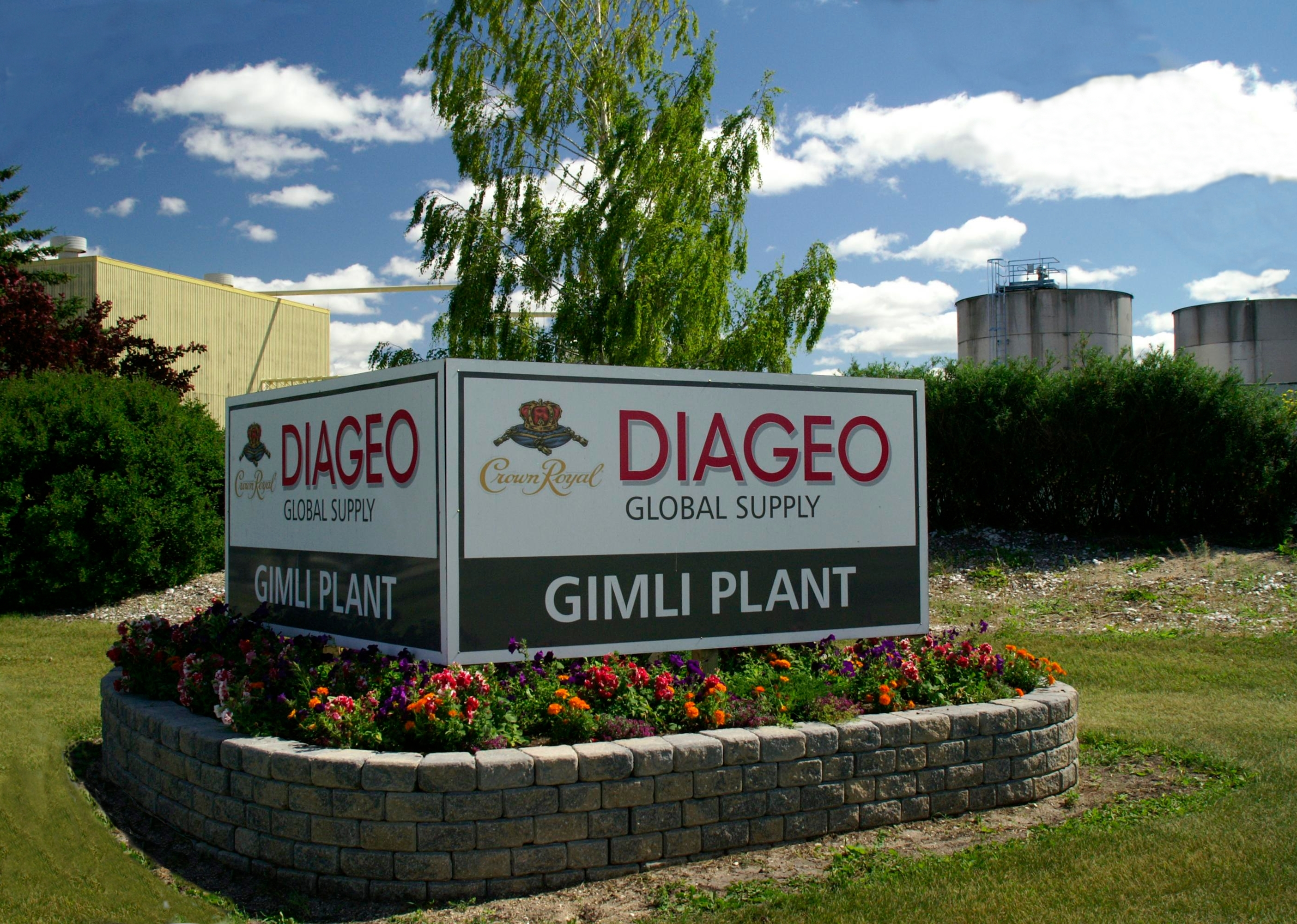
Signage for the Gimli plant in Gimli, Manitoba. The distillery was built in 1969 for use by Seagram.

While some capacity was switched to producing industrial alcohols in support of the country's World War II efforts, the industry expanded again after the war until the 1980s. In 1945, Schenley Industries purchased one of those industrial alcohol distilleries in Valleyfield, Quebec, and repurposed several defunct American whiskey brands, like Golden Wedding, Old Fine Copper, and starting in 1972, Gibson's Finest. Seeking to secure their supply of Canadian whisky, Barton Brands also built a new distillery in Collingwood, Ontario, in 1967, where they produced Canadian Mist, though they sold the distillery and brand only four years later to Brown–Forman. As proximity to the shipping routes (by rail and boat) to the US became less important, large distilleries were established in Alberta and Manitoba. Five years after starting to experiment with whiskies in their Toronto gin distillery, W. & A. Gilbey Ltd. created the Black Velvet blend in 1951 which was so successful a new distillery in Lethbridge, Alberta, was constructed in 1973 to produce it.

Also in the west, a Calgary-based business group recruited the Riefels from British Columbia to oversee their Alberta Distillers operations in 1948. The company became an innovator in the practice of bulk shipping whiskies to the United States for bottling and the success of their Windsor Canadian brand (produced in Alberta but bottled in the United States) led National Distillers Limited to purchase Alberta Distillers, in 1964, to secure their supply chain. More Alberta investors founded the Highwood Distillery in 1974 in High River, Alberta, which specialized in wheat-based whiskies. Seagram's opened a large, new plant in Gimli, Manitoba, in 1969, which would eventually replace their Waterloo and LaSalle distilleries. In British Columbia, Ernie Potter, who had been producing fruit liqueurs from alcohols distilled at Alberta Distillers, built his own whisky distillery in Langley in 1958 and produced the Potter's and Century brands of whisky. Hiram Walker's built the Okanagan Distillery in Winfield, British Columbia, in 1970 with the intention of producing Canadian Club but was redirected to fulfill contracts to produce whiskies for Suntory before being closed in 1995.

Whisky maturation in barrels at the Forty Creek Distillery

After decades of expansion, a shift in consumer preferences towards white spirits (such as vodka) in the American market resulted in an excess supply of Canadian whiskies. While this allowed the whiskies to be aged longer, the unexpected storage costs and deferred revenue strained individual companies. With the distillers seeking investors and multinational corporations seeking value brands, a series of acquisitions and mergers occurred. Alberta Distillers was bought in 1987 by Fortune Brands, which went on to become part of Suntory Global Spirits. Hiram Walker was sold in 1987 to Allied Lyons, which Pernod Ricard took over in 2006, with Fortune Brands acquiring the Canadian Club brand. Grand Metropolitan had purchased Black Velvet in 1972 but sold the brand in 1999 to Constellation Brands, who in turn sold it to Heaven Hill in 2019. Schenley was acquired in 1990 by United Distillers, which went on to become part of Diageo, though Gibson's Finest was sold to William Grant & Sons in 2001. Seagram's was sold in 2000 to Vivendi, which in turn sold its various brands and distilleries to Pernod Ricard and Diageo. Highwood purchased Potter's in 2006. Despite the consolidation, the Kittling Ridge Distillery in Grimsby, Ontario, began to produce the Forty Creek brand, though it was sold to the Campari Group in 2014. Later, the Sazerac Company purchased the brands Seagram's VO, Canadian 83 and Five Star from Diageo in 2018.

=== Illicit export to the United States ===
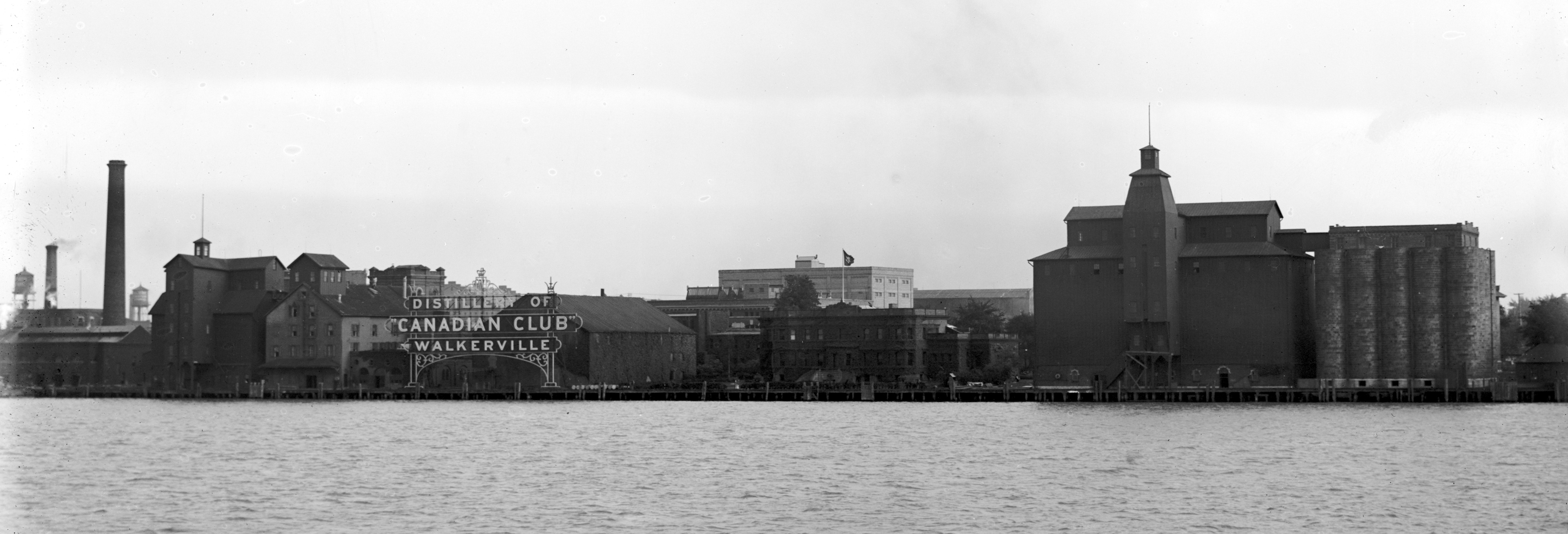
Distillery in Windsor, Ontario, c. 1905–1915. Distilleries near the Canada–United States border served bootleggers during prohibition in the U.S.

Canadian whisky featured prominently in rum-running into the U.S. during Prohibition. Hiram Walker's distillery in Windsor, Ontario, directly across the Detroit River and the international boundary between Canada and the United States, easily served bootleggers using small, fast smuggling boats.

== Distilleries and brands ==
The following is a listing of distilleries presently producing Canadian whiskies:

=== Alberta ===
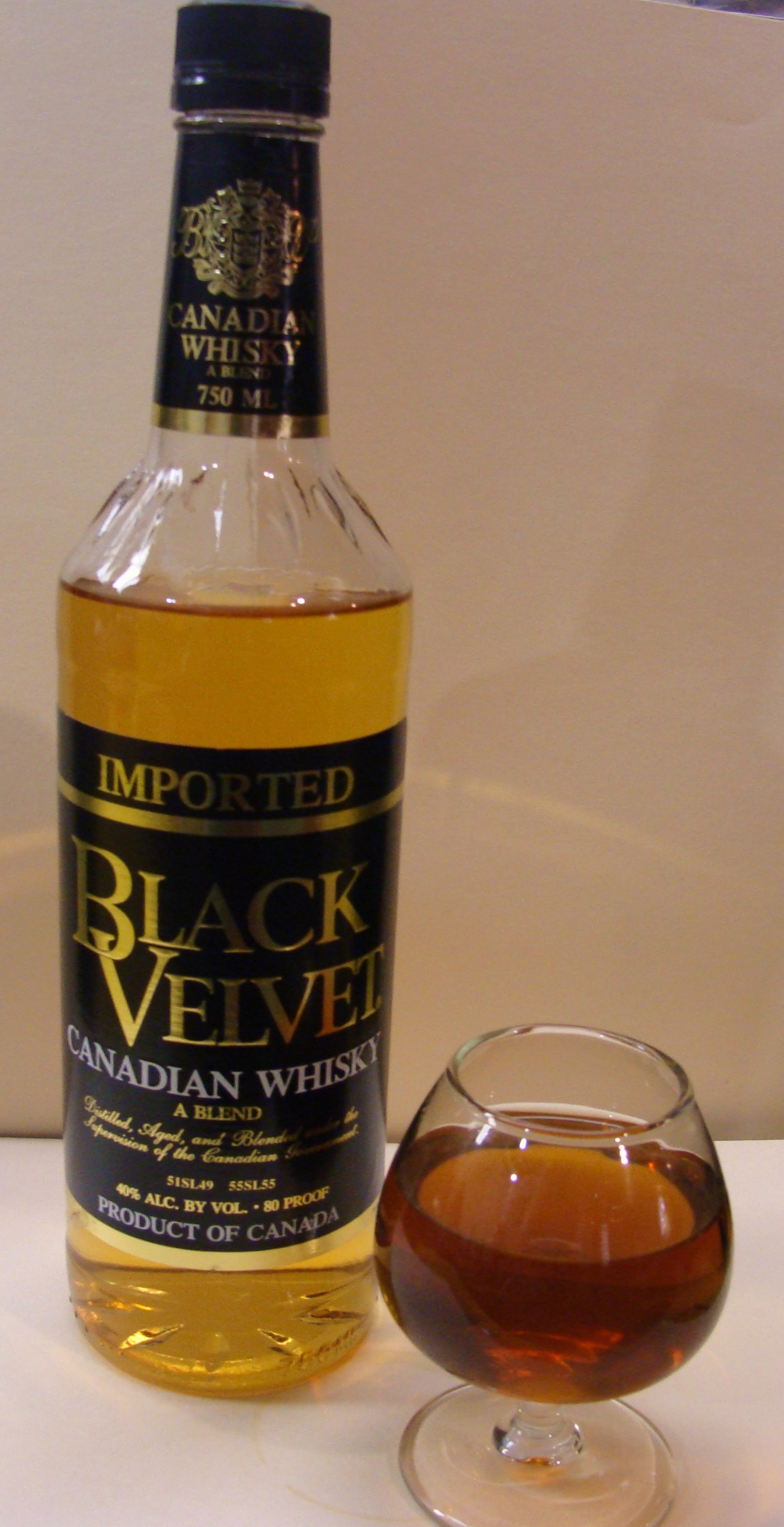
A bottle of Black Velvet is a whisky produced at Black Velvet Distillery in Lethbridge

There are several distilleries based in Alberta.

Alberta Distillers was established in 1946 in Calgary, Alberta. The distillery was purchased in 1987 by Fortune Brands, which became Beam Suntory in 2011 and Suntory Global Spirits in 2024. The distillery uses a specific strain of yeast which they developed that specializes in fermenting rye. While the distillery exports much of its whisky for bottling in other countries, they also produce the brands Alberta Premium, Alberta Springs, Windsor Canadian, Tangle Ridge, and Canadian Club Chairman's Select.

Black Velvet Distillery (formerly the Palliser Distillery) was established in 1973 in Lethbridge, Alberta, and has been owned by Heaven Hill since 2019. It produces the Black Velvet brand, mostly shipped in bulk for bottling in the United States, with some bottled onsite for Canadians. It also makes Danfield's and the Schenley's Golden Wedding and OFC labels.

Highwood Distillery (formerly the Sunnyvale Distillery) was established in 1974 in High River, Alberta. It specializes in using wheat in their base whiskies. This distillery also produces vodka, rum, gin and liqueurs. Brands of Canadian whisky produced at the Highwood Distillery include Centennial, Century, Ninety, and Potter's. They also produce White Owl whisky which is charcoal-filtered to remove the colouring introduced by aging in wood barrels.

=== Manitoba ===
Gimli Distillery was established in 1968 in Gimli, Manitoba, to produce Seagram brands, and was acquired by Diageo in 2001. The Gimli Distillery is responsible for producing Crown Royal, the best-selling Canadian whisky in the world with 7 million cases (Note: A case is equivalent to twelve 750 mL bottles or 9 litres total.) shipped in 2017. They also supply some of the whisky used in Seagram's VO and other blends.

=== Ontario ===
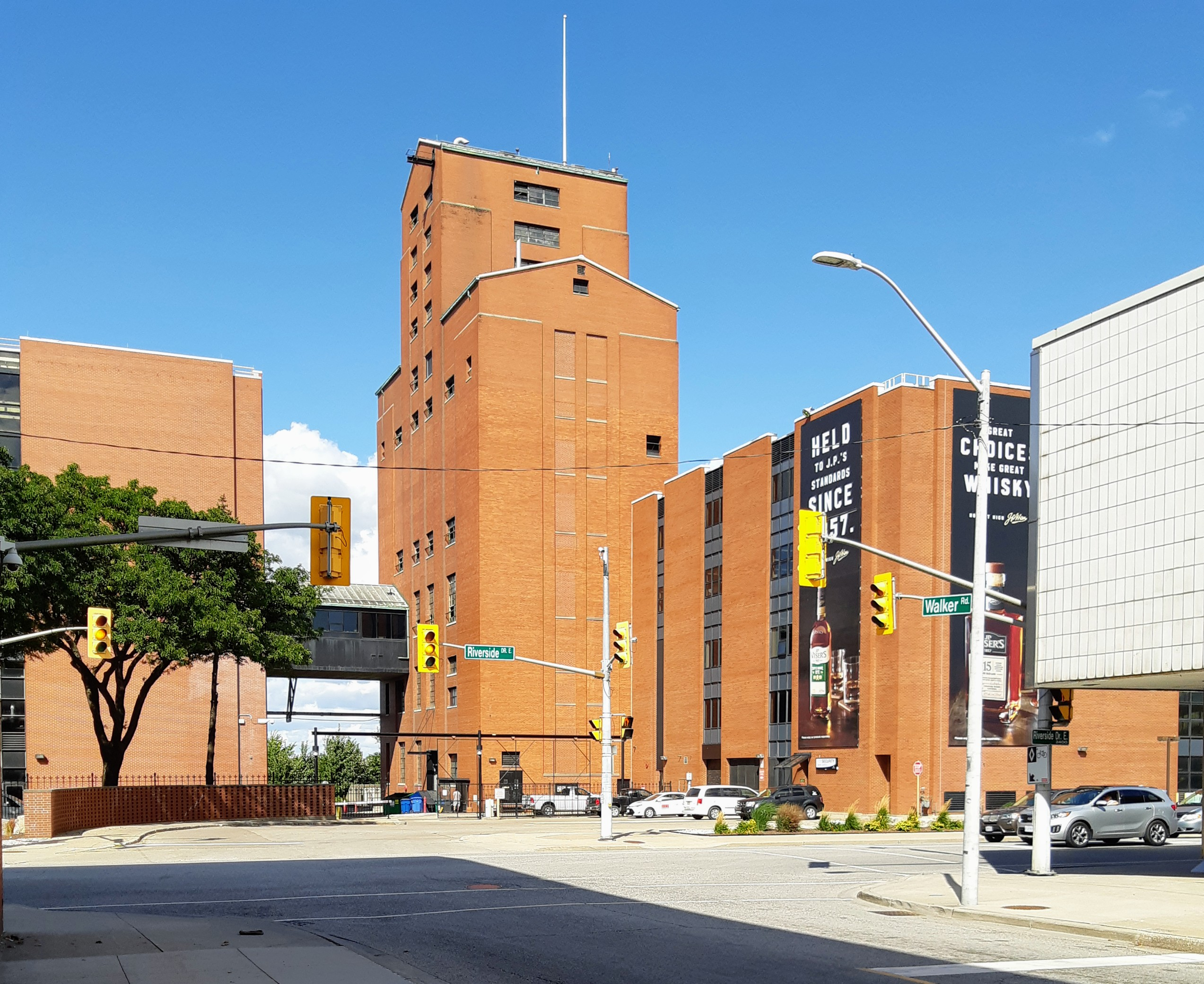
The Hiram Walker Distillery in Windsor, Ontario. Established in 1858, it is the oldest functioning distillery in the province.

Distilleries were established in Ontario during the mid-19th century, with Gooderham and Worts's beginning operations in Toronto's Distillery District in the 1830s. Distilleries continued to operate from the Distillery District until 1990, when the area was reoriented towards commercial and residential development. Other former distilleries in the province includes one in Corbyville, which hosted a distillery operated by Corby Spirit and Wine. A distillery in Waterloo was operated by Seagram to produce Crown Royal until 1992; although the company still maintains a blending and bottling plant in Amherstburg.

Presently, there are several major distilleries based in Ontario. The oldest functioning distillery in Ontario is the Hiram Walker Distillery, established in 1858 in Windsor but modernized and expanded upon several times since. The distillery is owned by Pernod Ricard and operated by Corby Spirit and Wine, of which Pernod has a controlling share. Brands produced at the Walker Distillery include Lot 40, Pike Creek, Gooderham and Worts, Hiram Walker's Special Old, Corby's Royal Reserve, and J.P. Wiser's brands. Most of its capacity is used for contract production of the Suntory Global Spirits brand (and former Hiram Walker brand) Canadian Club, in addition to generic Canadian whisky that is exported in bulk and bottled under various labels in other countries.

Canadian Mist Distillery was established in 1967 in Collingwood. The distillery is owned by the Sazerac Company and primarily produces the Canadian Mist brand for export. The distillery also produces whiskies used in the Collingwood brand, introduced 2011, and the Bearface brand, introduced 2018.

Kittling Ridge Distillery was established in 1992 with an associated winery in Grimsby. Its first whiskies came to market in 2002. The distillery was purchased in 2014 by Campari Group. The distillery produces the Forty Creek brand.

=== Quebec ===
Old Montreal Distillery was established in 1929 as a Corby Spirit and Wine distillery. It was acquired by Sazerac Company in 2011 and modernized in 2018. It produces Sazerac brands and has taken over bottling of Caribou Crossing.

Valleyfield Distillery (formerly the Schenley Distillery) was established in 1945 in a former brewery in Salaberry-de-Valleyfield, near Montreal, the distillery has been owned by Diageo in 2008. Seagram's VO is bottled here with flavouring whisky from the Gimli Distillery. Otherwise, the Valleyfield Distillery specializes in producing base whiskies distilled from corn for other Diageo products.

== See also ==
- Canadian beer
- Canadian wine
- Outline of whisky
