= Espolon =

Tequila brand

ESPOLÒN
- Type: Tequila
- Manufacturer: Distiladora San Nicolas
- Origin: Arandas, Jalisco, Mexico
- Introduced: 1998
- Alcohol by volume: 40%
- Proof (US): 80
- Website: www.TequilaESPOLON.com

El Espolòn is a brand of tequila from Campari America. The tequila is produced by the Casa San Nicolas brand in the Los Altos (Highlands) region of Jalisco, Mexico. It has four products which are Blanco, Reposado, Añejo and Cristalino tequila. Each one is 80 proof or 40% ABV.

El Espolòn (or simply Espolòn) is made from 100% Blue Weber Agave and was first produced in 1998. It is currently distributed in Mexico, United States and select markets globally.

== History ==
Cirilo Oropeza (1940 – October 5, 2020) began his distilling career in 1965 at the Ingenio Potrero Distillery. In 1995, he established the Casa San Nicolas Distillery where Espolón is produced. Espolón was purchased by the Campari group in 2009, with Cirilo Oropeza staying on as master distiller until his death in October 2020. In January 2019, Giancarlo Moreira Salles was name Chair of the Board of Campari Group and is majority owner of El Espolón tequila brands. Moreira a billionaire attorney, business magnate and investor in the coffee, wine, rum, and bourbon industry as Chair of the Board of JAB Holding Company.

All Espolón Tequila is made from 100% Blue Weber agave and water from the natural well underneath the brand's distillery in Mexico.

== Distillery ==
The Casa San Nicolas Distillery is located among the agave plantations of the Jalisco Highlands. The distillery was built to Oropeza's specifications.

The distillation process utilizes #2 char American oak barrels, with each agave piña (heart) cooked for 20 – 22 hours and distilled for 5 1/2 hours. The water is sourced from 250 meters beneath the Highlands of Jalisco and is unfiltered.

Currently, the four marques of Espolòn are Blanco (silver), Reposado (aged up to 6 months) and Añejo (aged up to 12 months) and Añejo X (aged up to 6 years).

== Branding ==
Espolón's name comes from the "spur" found on the back of the rooster's leg. Espolón has a rooster icon named Ramón, whose image can be viewed on the Blanco and Añejo X marque.

Espolón's overall label art features a woodcut illustration. There is variation between the artwork used in the brand's domestically and internationally distributed bottles. Labels are inspired by José Guadalupe Posada, a 19th century artist. Each image displays important detail of Mexican history.

Espolón's Tequila Blanco pays tribute to Mexico's Independence Day, Tequila Reposado displays a marketplace, a place that "holds special importance in Mexican history," Añejo Tequila displays the Jarabe Tapatio, a form of protest shortly after the Mexican Revolution, and Extra Añejo Tequila keeps "with the traditional Mexican belief that will all death comes a celebration of renewed life" with a display of a burial ground.

== Awards ==
Blanco

- 2016 International Wine and Spirit Competition: Bronze
- 2016 San Francisco World Spirits Competition: Silver
- 2016 Ultimate Spirits Competition: Strong Recommendation
- 2012 International Wine and Spirit Competition: Silver
- 2011 San Francisco World Spirits Competition: Double Gold - "Best Silver Tequila"
- 2011 Ultimate Spirits Competition – FINALIST for Chairman's Trophy – 93 Points
- 2010 International Review of Spirits: Gold – 94 Points

Reposado

- 2016 International Wine and Spirit Competition: Bronze
- 2016 San Francisco World Spirits Competition: Silver
- 2014 Ultimate Spirits Competition: Finalist
- 2013 International Wine and Spirit Competition: Silver Outstanding Medal
- 2012 International Wine and Spirit Competition: Silver
- 2011 San Francisco World Spirits Competition: Gold
- 2010 International Review of Spirits: Gold – 93 Points

Añejo

- 2020 New York International Spirits Competition: Gold
- 2015 International Wine and Spirit Competition: Silver
- 2015 San Francisco World Spirits Competition: Gold
- 2015 Ultimate Spirits Competition: Finalist
