= Ancho Reyes =

Brand of ancho chile liqueur

- Type: Ancho chile liqueur
- Manufacturer: Casa Lumbre Spirits
- Distributor: Campari Group
- Origin: Mexico
- Introduced: 2013
- Alcohol by volume: 40%
- Proof (US): 80
- Colour: Brown
- Flavour: Chile pepper
- Variants: Ancho Reyes Verde (2016)
- Website: www.fabricaanchoreyes.com

Ancho Reyes is a brand of chile liqueur produced in Puebla City, Mexico, based on a 1927 recipe from the same city. The liqueur is made from and named after Puebla's renowned ancho chiles, a dried form of ripe poblano peppers. Ancho Reyes is a division of Casa Lumbre Spirits, and is distributed by Campari Group

The company produces two types of chile liqueur: the original, red Ancho Reyes liqueur and the newer, green Ancho Reyes Verde liqueur. The liqueur is produced using late harvest chiles that have sun-dried for 2 to 3 weeks. For the Verde version of the drink, early harvested fire-roasted poblano chiles are used in addition to the sun-dried chiles.

Both the red and green liqueurs are 40% ABV and are popular for adding a bit of spice to classic drinks like a margarita or a Paloma.
