= Luca Garavoglia =

Italian businessman (born 1969)

- Born: 27 February 1969 (age 56); Milan, Italy
- Education: Bocconi University
- Occupation: Businessman
- Title: Chairman, Campari Group
- Board member of: Campari Group
- Parent: Rosa Anna Magno Garavoglia

Luca Garavoglia (born 27 February 1969) is an Italian billionaire businessman, and the chairman of the Campari Group. As of September 2024, his net worth is estimated at US$3.8 billion.

Luca Garavoglia was born in Milan on 27 February 1969. He was educated at Milan's Istituto Leone XIII, and received a bachelor's degree in economics from Bocconi University, Milan in 1994.

Garavoglia has been the chairman of Campari Group since September 1994.

Following the death of his mother, Rosa Anna Magno Garavoglia on 22 November 2016, it was announced that her son Luca Garavoglia, chairman of Campari "would now assume control of Alicros, which owns 51 percent of Campari's equity, and an even greater share of voting rights".

== Other roles ==
Luca Garavoglia has been part of the boards of directors of Indesit and Fiat. Since 2005, he has been on the board of the FAI Foundation, and since 2011, on that of the Telethon Foundation.
