= Jarnac-Champagne =

- Commune
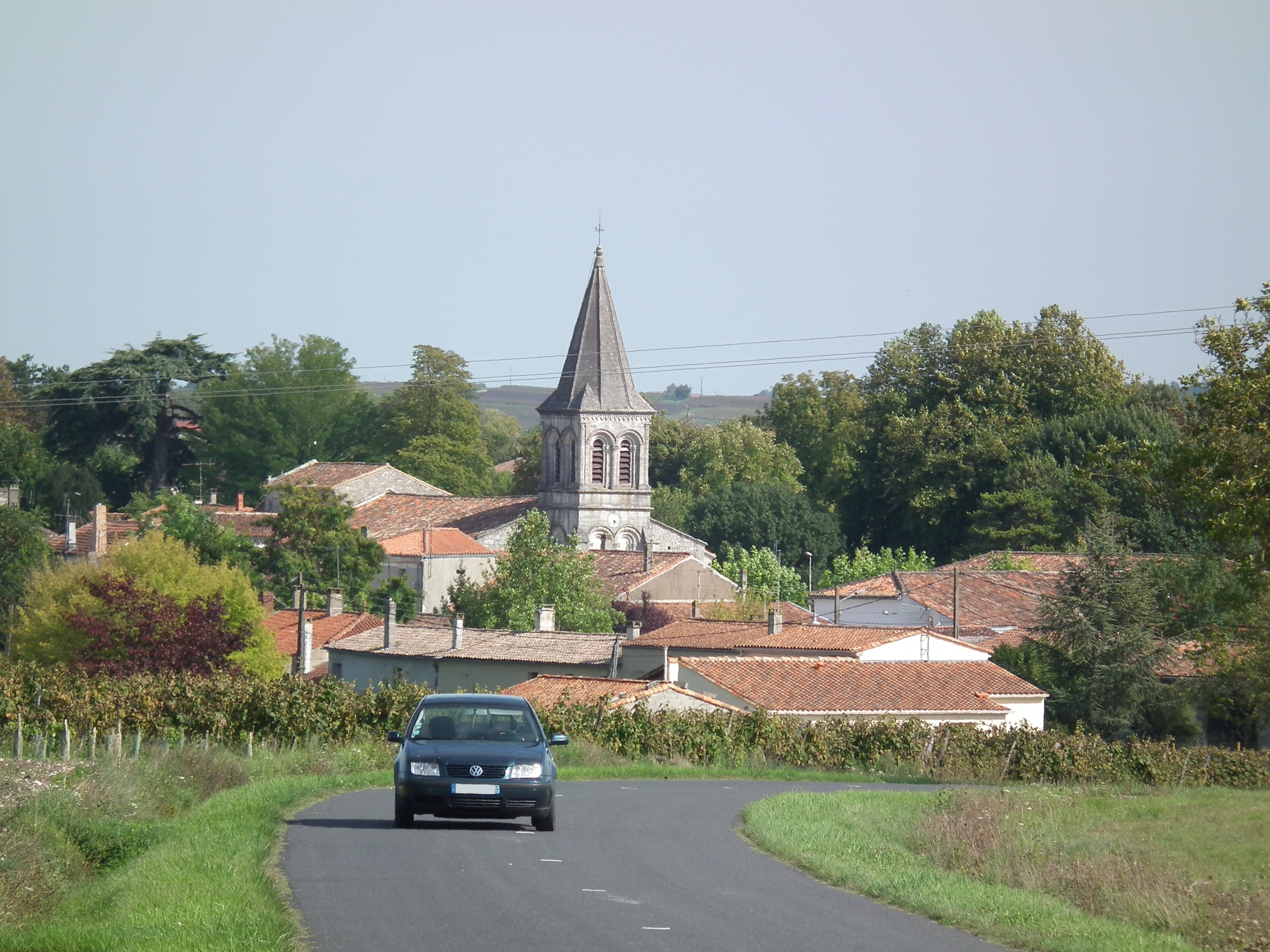
- A general view of Jarnac-Champagne

- Coat of arms
- Location of Jarnac-Champagne
- Location within France Location within Nouvelle-Aquitaine
- Coordinates: 45°33′35″N 0°23′55″W
- Country: France
- Region: Nouvelle-Aquitaine
- Department: Charente-Maritime
- Arrondissement: Jonzac
- Canton: Jonzac
- Intercommunality: CC de la Haute Saintonge

Government
  - Mayor (2020–2026): Christelle Neau
- Area^{1}: 21.95 km^{2} (8.47 sq mi)
- Elevation: 67 m (220 ft)
- Highest elevation: 81 m (266 ft)
- Lowest elevation: 37 m (121 ft)
- Population (2023): 878
  - Density: 40.0/km^{2} (104/sq mi)
- Time zone: UTC+01:00 (CET)
  - Summer (DST): UTC+02:00 (CEST)
- INSEE/Postal code: 17192 /17520
- ^{1} French Land Register data, which excludes lakes, ponds, glaciers > 1 km^{2} (0.386 sq mi or 247 acres) and river estuaries.

Jarnac-Champagne (French pronunciation: [ʒaʁnak ʃɑ̃paɲ]) is a commune in the Charente-Maritime department in southwestern France.

== Population ==
Historical population
| Year | Pop. | ±% p.a. |
|---|---|---|
| 1968 | 846 | — |
| 1975 | 762 | −1.48% |
| 1982 | 730 | −0.61% |
| 1990 | 713 | −0.29% |
| 1999 | 727 | +0.22% |
| 2007 | 765 | +0.64% |
| 2012 | 758 | −0.18% |
| 2017 | 786 | +0.73% |
| 2023 | 878 | +1.86% |
Source: INSEE

== See also ==
- Communes of the Charente-Maritime department
