= Campari Knoepffler =

Nicaraguan swimmer (born 1959)

Personal information
- Born: 10 November 1959 (age 67)

Sport
- Sport: Swimming

Campari Knoepffler (born 10 November 1959) is a Nicaraguan former swimmer. He competed in three events at the 1976 Summer Olympics.
