= Skyy =

Brand of vodka

- Type: Vodka
- Manufacturer: Campari Group
- Origin: United States
- Introduced: 1992
- Proof (US): 80
- Related products: List of vodkas
- Website: www.skyy.com

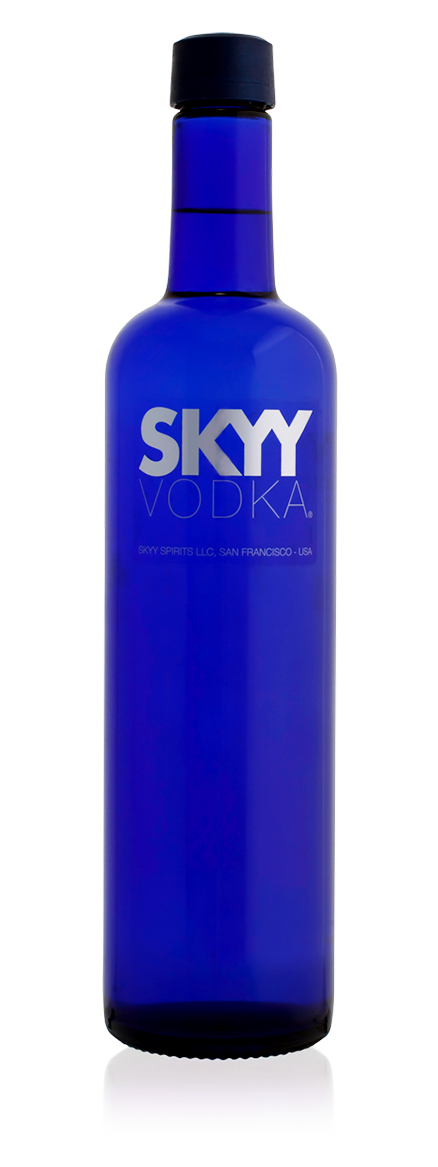
SKYY vodka

Skyy is an American vodka spirit produced by the Campari America division of Campari Group of Milan, Italy, formerly Skyy Spirits LLC. Skyy vodka is 40% ABV or 80 proof, except in Australia and New Zealand where it is 37.5% ABV / 75 Proof and in South Africa where it is 43% ABV / 86 Proof. Its creator, Maurice Kanbar, claims the vodka is nearly congener-free due to its distillation process. That is why the popular company slogan is "Vodka so filtered - we even took the Russia out of it". The bottle is a cobalt blue with a clear, adhesive label. In 2008, SKYY expanded the SKYY Vodka line with seventeen new flavors, referred to as Skyy Infusions. These Skyy Infusions are made with fruit.

== Brand ownership history ==
Skyy vodka was originally sold by Skyy Spirits LLC, established in 1992 by Maurice Kanbar. In 2009 Skyy Spirits LLC was acquired by Campari Group, and in 2012 was renamed Campari America. It is now a wholly owned subsidiary of Gruppo Campari, and markets not only the vodka line, but other Campari products as well.

== Manufacturing ==
Production and bottling of the product was initially outsourced to Frank-Lin Distillers Products in San Jose, California. Bulk ethanol was delivered in railroad tank cars to Frank-Lin's railroad siding near the San Jose rail yards. The ethanol was mixed with filtered and deionized water, flavoring was added, and the product was bottled using a 42-head US Bottlers Machinery Company filling machine to ensure uniform product level.

The ethanol was purchased from MGP Ingredients of Atchison, Kansas, a bulk ethanol producer for beverage, industrial, and fuel applications. MGP uses wheat as a feedstock for the process. The distillation plant is in Pekin, Illinois and is currently powered by natural gas, but United States Environmental Protection Agency approval has been requested to convert the plant to burn coal.

After the acquisition of the brand by Gruppo Campari, production was moved to Campari facilities.

== Awards ==
The unflavored Skyy won silver medals at the San Francisco World Spirits Competition.

== Donations ==
In 2025, Skyy — previously a platinum sponsor of New York City's Heritage of Pride annual Pride Week — scaled back its commitment.

== Bibliography ==
- Secrets from an Inventor's Notebook, Maurice Kanbar, Penguin Books, 2001, ISBN 0-14-200056-6
