= Gaspare Campari =

Italian drink maker (1828–1882)

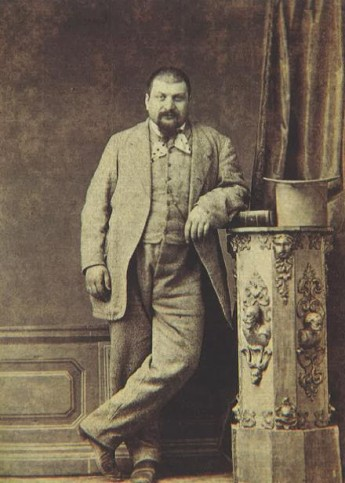
Gaspare Campari

Gaspare Campari (12 March 1828 – 14 April 1882) was an Italian drinks manufacturer.

Born in Cassolnovo, Italy, the tenth child of a farmer he was making drinks at the Bass Bar in Castelnouvo by age 14.

During the 1840s Campari sold a bitters-style aperitif throughout Italy, initially under the name Bitter all'Uso d'Holanda. In 1860 he formulated the product today known as Campari. His recipe, which Campari keeps confidential, contained more than 60 natural ingredients including herbs, spices, barks and fruit peels.

In 1862, he remarried and settled in Milan, the home of his second wife. He ran a cafe in front of Milan's historic cathedral, the Duomo. He also opened up Cafe Camparino nearby. His two sons, Davide and Guido, would go on to take over the business, which would become Davide Campari-Milano N.V. and Gruppo Campari.
