= Campari Group =

Italian beverage company

Davide Campari-Milano N.V.
- Type: Public (N.V.)
- Traded as: BIT: CPR; FTSE MIB Component
- Industry: Drink industry
- Founded: 1860; 166 years ago
- Founder: Gaspare Campari
- Headquarters: Milan, Italy
- Key people: Robert (Bob) Kunze-Concewitz (CEO); Luca Garavoglia (Chairman)
- Products: Spirits, wines, soft drinks
- Revenue: ▼€ 1.772 billion (2020)
- Operating income: ▼€ 231.8 million (2020)
- Net income: ▼€ 186.9 million (2020)
- Total assets: ▲€ 4.555 billion (2020)
- Total equity: ▲€ 1.998 billion (2020)
- Number of employees: 3,784 (2020)
- Website: camparigroup.com

Davide Campari-Milano N.V., trading as Campari Group, is an Italian company active since 1860 in the branded beverage industry. It produces spirits, wines, and non-alcoholic apéritifs. From its signature product, Campari, its portfolio has been extended to include over 50 brands, including Aperol, Appleton, Picon, SKYY vodka, Espolón, Wild Turkey, Grand Marnier, and Forty Creek whisky.

== Group profile ==
Founded in Milan by Gaspare Campari and currently headquartered in Sesto San Giovanni, the Group is now a global company (sixth-largest spirits group worldwide), marketing and distributing its products in over 190 countries. Production is concentrated in 22 manufacturing plants.

Campari Group employs approximately 4,000 people and has its own distribution network. The company operates in Austria, Belgium, Germany, Italy, Luxembourg, Russia, Switzerland, the UK and Ukraine in Europe; Argentina, Brazil, Jamaica, Mexico, Canada, and the United States in the Americas, as well as in Australia and China. Sales for 2012 amounted to €1,340.8 million, 76.7% of which was in spirits, 14.6% in wines, and around 8% in soft drinks.

== History ==
=== The first century ===
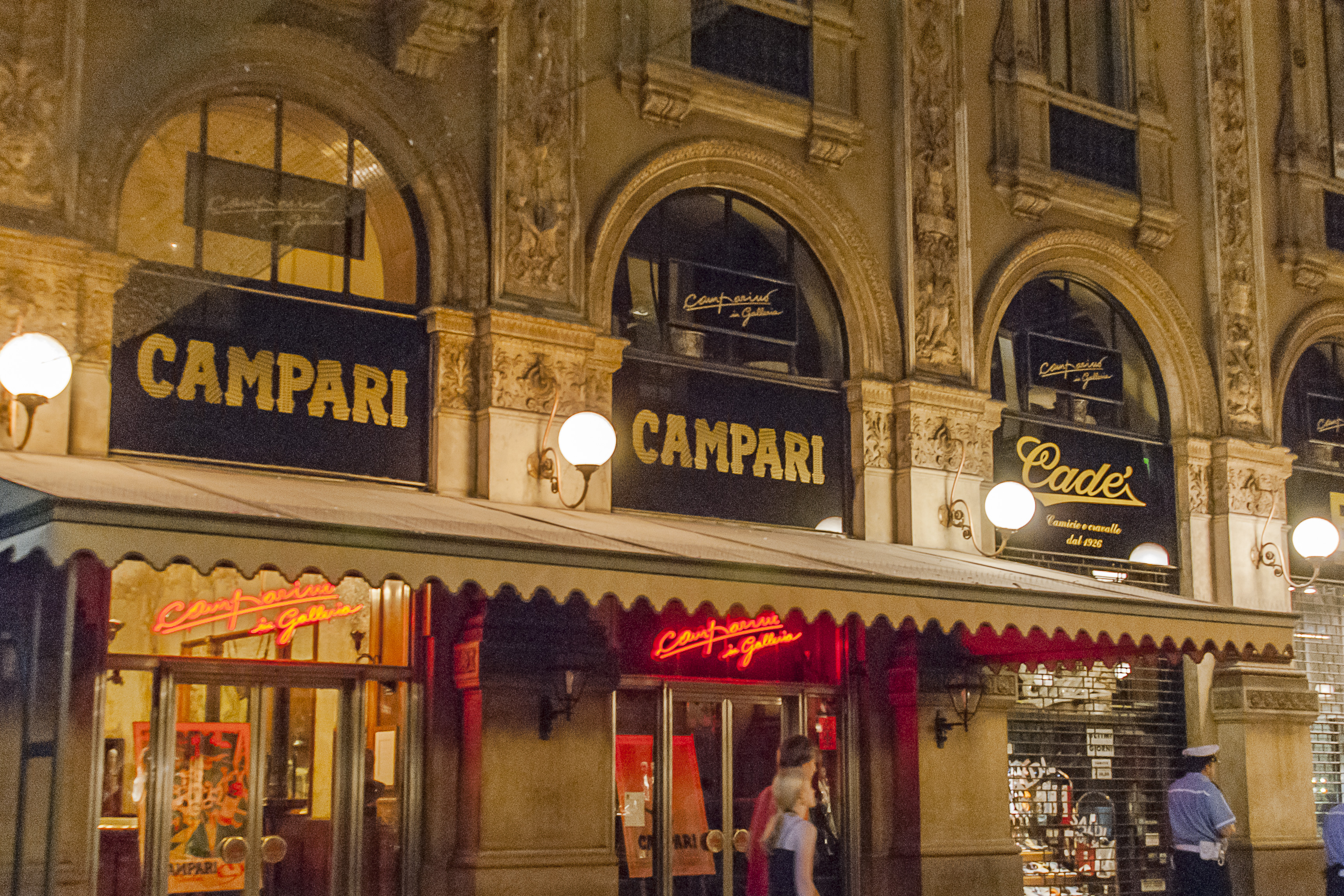
Campari shop in Galleria Vittorio Emanuele II in Milan.

Campari Group traces its beginnings back to 1860, with the birth of its flagship brand and signature, red aperitif beverage Campari. Born in 1828, Gaspare Campari, the inventor of the recipe, was the 10th child of a farming family. Deciding to open his own bar, it became so successful that he opened another in the heart of Milan, making his own cordials, cream liqueurs and bitters in the basement. His choice of location near the Duomo coincided with the opening of Galleria Vittorio Emanuele, contributing to the fame of its bar and its bitters, then called Bitter all'Uso d'Olanda, which became extremely popular at the time.

In 1904 the historic production site at Sesto San Giovanni was inaugurated. It would remain in operation until 2005 when a new production site was opened in Novi Ligure.

In 1926 Davide, Gaspare's son, transformed the company by dropping the production of all drinks other than a Campari bitter and Cordial Campari. Davide dedicated his considerable energy and determination to making the brand known across the world.

In 1932 Camparisoda, the first single-serve aperitif in the world, was launched. The bottle was designed by Fortunato Depero, one of the most famous Futurist artists of the time. The iconic bottle, unchanged to this day, has become a symbol of everyday "usable" design objects in Italy and the world. Depero's invention had many highly innovative features. It was the first single-dose product, it was ready for consumption and it contained a pre-dinner drink mix of Campari and soda. The bottle's striking design resembled an upside down glass.

Davide Campari died in 1936; ten years later, the company incorporated as Davide Campari-Milano S.p.A. The company remained concentrated on this core product for most of the rest of the century, even after Domenico Garavoglia gained control of it in the 1970s.

=== 1990-Today ===
Logo of Campari Group between 1998 and 2008

In the 1990s, the consolidation of the global drinks market led Campari to build its own portfolio of brands. In 1995, Campari acquired the Italian branch of the Dutch Group BolsWessanen, which distributed Crodino, Cynar, Lemonsoda, Oransoda, Biancosarti and Crodo. In 1998, Campari acquired a minority stake in Skyy Spirits LLC, owner of SKYY vodka, along with the world distribution rights (except for the USA). In return, Skyy Spirits LLC became the distributor for the whole Campari portfolio in the US. Campari acquired the Italian distribution rights of Lipton Ice Tea (1998), the anise-based Greek spirit Ouzo 12 (1999), the Italian vermouth Cinzano (1999).

In July 2001, the group completed its IPO on the Borsa Italiana, in Italy's biggest IPO of the year. The shares were priced at the lower end of the indicative price range of 30 to 38. The initial public offering was three times oversubscribed.

The group later acquired leading brands like the Dreher aguardiente, the Old Eight, Drury's, Gregson's and Gold Cup whiskies and Liebfraumilch wine. Campari acquired Zedda Piras S.p.A. (Mirto di Sardegna), owning a majority stake in Sella & Mosca S.p.A. (2002), the sparkling white wine Riccadonna (2003), Barbero 1891 S.p.A.owner of brands Aperol, Aperol Soda, Barbieri, Mondoro, Enrico Serafino (2003), and the Tuscan winery Teruzzi & Puthod.

In 2006, Campari Group entered the Scotch whisky segment by acquiring from Pernod Ricard the brands Glen Grant (including its distillery), Old Smuggler and Braemar, and the tequila segment in 2007 with the acquisition of Cabo Wabo tequila (founded by Sammy Hagar). In 2009, the Campari Group bought the Kentucky bourbon whiskey group Wild Turkey and its distillery in Lawrenceburg from Pernod Ricard.

In 2010, Campari Group announced an agreement to acquire Carolans Irish Cream, Frangelico Hazelnut Liqueur and Irish Mist Whiskey Honey Liqueur.

On July 6, 2011, Campari Group celebrated the tenth anniversary of its listing on Borsa Italiana.

In December 2012, Campari Group announced the successful acquisition of Lascelles deMercado & Co. Limited, including four brands: Appleton Estate, Appleton Special/White, Wray & Nephew, and Coruba, the related upstream supply chain and the local distribution company.

In 2014, Campari Group announced the successful acquisition of Averna, Italy's second best-selling bitter, at 103.75 million euros ($143 million). The Averna group owns a portfolio of premium brands, among which are Braulio, a herb-based bitter, and Grappa Frattina, through which Campari entered the grappa category.

In March 2014, Campari Group purchased Canadian whisky producer Forty Creek Distillery Ltd. for $185.6 million (Canadian). The sale included 100% of the distillery, including all Forty Creek facilities and whisky stocks. Founder John Hall stayed on as master distiller and blender.

Campari Group's biggest acquisition to date was of Grand Marnier in 2016. In 2017, Campari acquired Bulldog London Dry Gin and then acquired French brand Bisquit Cognac in 2018.

In 2019, Campari Group purchased Rhumantilles, maker of French rums Trois Rivières and Maison La Mauny; as well as Licorera Ancho Reyes and Casa Montelobos.

Campari Group celebrated its 160th anniversary that year with the Infinito Campari installation, designed by sculptor Oliviero Rainaldi. The company also curated The Spiritheque, an editorial collection of illustrated and animated stories relaying anecdotes behind the main brands of Campari Group's product portfolio represented in a virtual art gallery.

2021 marked Campari Group's 20th anniversary on the Italian Stock Exchange. In August 2022, Campari Group acquired a 15% stake in Howler Head, a flavoured bourbon brand from Catalyst Spirits. In October 2022, the Campari Group had acquired a minority stake in the global spirits incubator Catalyst Sprits for an undisclosed sum, and 70% stake of the Wilderness Trail Distillery for $420 million.

In December 2023, Campari bought the cognac Courvoisier from Beam Suntory. The purchase was completed in May 2024.

On June 26, 2025, Campari Group announced the sale of Cinzano for 100 million euros to the Gruppo Caffo 1915.

Campari products awaiting distribution at the Forty Creek Distillery in Grimsby, Ontario

On October 31, 2025 Italian tax police announced they had seized shares worth 1.29 billion euros ($1.5 billion) from Luxembourg-based Lagfin SCA, the holding company that controls Campari, over alleged tax evasion. Lagfin SCA denied any wrongdoing and said in a statement that it would defend its position "vigorously and serenely in all competent forums".

In December 2024 the board nominated Simon Hunt, a former chief executive of William Grant & Sons, as CEO; he took office in January 2025 after Matteo Fantacchiotti resigned in September 2024. On 18 December 2025, Campari Group announced the sale of Averna and Zedda Piras.

In June 2026, as part of a strategy to streamline its portfolio and focus on core spirit brands, Campari Group finalized the sale of a 100% stake in the Amaro Averna and Zedda Piras brands to Illva Saronno Holding.

== Brands ==
Campari's beverage brands include:

Brand	Type	Country
Aperol	Apéritif	Italy
Campari	Apéritif	Italy
Campari Soda	Apéritif	Italy
Crodino	Apéritif	Italy
Del Professore	Apéritif	Italy
Champagne Lallier	Champagne	France
Bisquit	Cognac	France
Courvoisier	Cognac	France
Bickens	Gin	United Kingdom
Bulldog	Gin	United Kingdom
O'ndina	Gin	Italy
Amaro Averna	Liqueur	Italy
Ancho Reyes	Liqueur	Mexico
Braulio	Liqueur	Italy
Cynar	Liqueur	Italy
Dreher	Liqueur	Brazil
Frangelico	Liqueur	Italy
Grand Marnier	Liqueur	France
Ouzo 12	Liqueur	Greece
Sagatiba	Liqueur	Brazil
Zedda Piras	Liqueur	Italy
Montelobos	Mezcal	Mexico
Appleton Estate	Rum	Jamaica
Kingston 62	Rum	Jamaica
La Mauny	Rum	France
Trois Rivières	Rum	France
Wray and Nephew	Rum	Jamaica
Mondoro - Asti	Sparkling wine	Italy
Riccadonna	Sparkling wine	Italy
Cabo Wabo	Tequila	Mexico
Espolon	Tequila	Mexico
Mayenda Tequila	Tequila	Mexico
SKYY	Vodka	United States
Wild Turkey	Bourbon whiskey	United States
Forty Creek	Canadian whisky	Canada
Glen Grant	Scotch whisky	Scotland

== Former brands ==
Brands once owned but later sold by the Campari group.

Brand	Type	Country
Cinzano Vermouth (Rosso, Bianco, Extra Dry)	Apéritif	Italy
1757 Vermouth di Torino (Extra Dry, Rosso)	Apéritif	Italy
Cinzano	Sparkling wine	Italy
Amaro Averna	Liqueur	Italy
Zedda Piras	Liqueur	Italy

== See also ==
- List of Italian companies
