= Raj Bhakta =

American politician and businessman

Raj Peter Bhakta
- Born: Philadelphia, Pennsylvania, U.S.
- Education: Boston College (BA)

Raj Peter Bhakta (born 1975) is an American entrepreneur, spirits industry executive, real estate investor, and former media and political personality. In 2004, Bhakta was a contestant on the second season of the reality show The Apprentice. He is also the founder of WhistlePig whiskey, a premium whiskey company. In 2006, he campaigned for a seat in the United States House of Representatives from Pennsylvania's 13th district as a Republican, but lost to incumbent Democrat Allyson Schwartz. Raj Peter Bhakta is a practicing Roman Catholic and holds political views aligned with the Christian right.

== Early life and education ==
Born to a Gujarati father from Nansad near Surat, India and an Irish mother, Bhakta moved from Oxford Circle, Philadelphia to Blue Bell, Pennsylvania, where he grew up. After graduating from The Hill School in Pottstown, Pennsylvania, Bhakta earned a Bachelor of Arts degree from Boston College in Economics and History with a concentration in Finance in 1998.

== Career ==
=== Business ===
Bhakta began his career working at the investment banking firm of Violy & Co. in New York City. Bhakta then founded Automovia, a technology startup specializing in the valuation of pre-owned vehicles. Thereafter, he led the Apex Vail condominium development project in Vail, Colorado.

=== The Apprentice ===
In the fall of 2004, Bhakta appeared on the second season of the business reality television show, The Apprentice. On the show, Bhakta propositioned Anna Kournikova and Donald Trump's assistant to go out with him on dates, and was fired by Trump on the ninth week of the show. His relationships with women became fodder for gossip columns such as New York Post's Page Six, and his frequent wearing of bow ties was credited with a surge in bow tie sales.

=== Political engagement and commentary ===
After appearing on The Apprentice, Bhakta advocated Social Security reform in meetings with Congressional leadership. Bhakta was also a guest on MSNBC and Fox News and appeared on CNN's Crossfire.

=== 2006 Congressional campaign ===
With the support of Thomas J. Ellis, the Republican chairman of the Montgomery County Board of Commissioners, he sought and won the Republican nomination for the 13th congressional district. In the general election, Bhakta lost to incumbent Democrat Allyson Schwartz by more than 30 points. Bhakta's campaign generated significant national media attention as a consequence of Bhakta's background on The Apprentice, his attention-getting campaign maneuvers, and his reputation as a playboy.

During the campaign, Bhakta's judgment and fitness to lead were called into question as a result of his having been arrested twice, in 1997 and 2004, for drunk driving. After reports of the arrests surfaced during the campaign, Bhakta said "I ask for the forgiveness and understanding of the voters, while giving them my solemn pledge that this behavior will not happen again", and said "Politicians today need to come clean".

On October 10, 2006, Bhakta illustrated the ease of crossing the United States-Mexico border by riding an elephant along the border for ninety minutes, accompanied by a six-man mariachi band. Neither Bhakta nor the mariachi band broke the law by crossing the border, as they remained on private property along the Rio Grande in Texas. Bhakta said that he got the idea by seeing a Mexican man illegally cross the border by wading across the Rio Grande. Bhakta had a camera to record the man's illegal crossing, and succeeded in getting the man detained by border authorities. The demonstration garnered national attention for Bhakta's campaign. Bhakta was interviewed by Bill O'Reilly, Rita Cosby, Glenn Beck, and John Gibson. "This is not about the poor Mexican immigrant who wants to come for a better life that's the real problem here," Bhakta said. He added, "The border security is a joke and this is a creative and very effective way of showing it."

On November 7, 2006, the Philadelphia Daily News reported that Bhakta's campaign made "stunning" automated campaign calls to homes in Northeast Philadelphia and Montgomery County detailing the charges in 18 lawsuits against an abortion clinic founded by Schwartz.

== WhistlePig Whiskey ==
Bhakta founded the WhistlePig brand of rye whiskey, which was initially launched as a non-distiller producer that bottled Canadian whiskey from the Alberta Premium distillery owned by Fortune Brands in Alberta, Canada. Starting in 2007, he purchased land in Vermont, on which he built a new distillery and aging facility for the brand. The brand was officially launched in 2010.

Bhakta was forced out of the WhistlePig. He sold his shares and fully exited the company in 2019.

== Bhakta Spirits ==
After leaving WhistlePig, Bhakta launched his new enterprise Bhakta Spirits in Shoreham, Vermont. In 2019, Bhakta negotiated purchase of a rare stock of aged Armagnac brandies while on vacation in Gers, France. With vintages dating from 1868 to 1970, these spirits were the basis for his new enterprise, Bhakta Spirits. After acquiring the brandy stocks, along with the Condom, Gers chateau where they were found, Bhakta brought them back to Vermont for blending and marketing. His flagship brandy, BHAKTA 50, launched in July 2020.

In 2019, Bhakta purchased the Whiteface Ranch in Indian River County, Florida for $5.9 million and began rum distilling operation on the site.

In 2024, Bhakta expanded the company's American whiskey portfolio with the launch of Hogsworth, a brand combining American bourbon with vintage French Armagnac.

== Purchase of Green Mountain College Campus ==
In August 2020, Bhakta purchased at auction the campus of Green Mountain College in Poultney, Vermont. In 2026, he has offered it free to any missionary group associated with the Catholic Church holding "a vision aligned with the revival of the United States and Western Civilization."

== Personal life ==
Bhakta met Danhee Kim, a Columbia University grad in 2010, while she was hired as his executive assistant. Kim later worked as a marketing and sales director for Bhakta's WhistlePig whiskey company. The couple married in 2013 and lived in Vermont. The couple moved to Vero Beach, Florida in 2017.

=== Religious views ===
Raj Bhakta is a Catholic Christian. He has advocated for views aligned with the Christian right, stating that "There's a deeper, more fundamental need in this country, and that is to go back to our Christian roots." In particular, Bhakta has advocated Christian nationalism in higher education, offering to donate the now defunct Green Mountain College to a Christian organization interested in this revival theological mission.

== See also ==
- List of bow tie wearers
