= Watershed =

Watershed may refer to:

== Hydrology ==
- Drainage divide, the line that separates neighbouring drainage basins
- Drainage basin, an area of land where surface water converges (North American usage)

== Music ==
- Watershed Music Festival, an annual country music event in George, Washington, US

=== Bands ===
- Watershed (American band), rock band active since 1987
- Watershed (South African band), pop-rock band active since 1998

=== Works ===
- Watershed (Grant McLennan album), the debut solo album by Grant McLennan
- Watershed (k.d. lang album), the fifth solo studio album by k.d. lang
- Watershed (Opeth album), the ninth full-length studio album by Opeth
- "The Watershed", a song by Mark Hollis, from his eponymous album Mark Hollis
- "Watershed", a song on the album Anaïs Mitchell by Anaïs Mitchell, 2022
- "Watershed", a song on the album Nomads Indians Saints by the Indigo Girls
- "Wattershed", a song by Foo Fighters on their 1995 eponymous debut album
- Watershed, a 2022 oratorio based on the murder of George Duncan in Adelaide, South Australia

== Places ==
- Watershed, Bristol, an arts and media venue in England
- Watershed College, a boarding school in Zimbabwe
- Watershed Distillery, Columbus, Ohio, US
- Watershed mine, Far North Queensland, Australia
- Watershed Park, a large wooded public park in Olympia, Washington
- Watershed Trail, a ex-rail footpath from Roxana to Edwardsville in Illinois, US

== Science and technology ==
- Watershed area (medical), an area with overlapping blood supply
  - Watershed stroke, a stroke in a brain watershed
- Watershed (image processing), algorithms used in image processing
- Watershed LRS, a Learning Record Store and Learning Analytics Platform

== Television and radio ==
- Watershed (broadcasting), a time of day when adult programming begins
- "Watershed" (Soulmates), a 2020 television episode

== See also ==
- Watershed district (disambiguation)
- Watersheddings, the site of a rugby league stadium
