= Dave Pickerell =

American distiller

David Steven Pickerell (August 14, 1956 – November 1, 2018) was an American distiller. He was considered the "Johnny Appleseed" or "founding father" of craft distilling.

== Early life and education ==
Pickerell was born on August 14, 1956, in Fairborn, Ohio. His father, Richard Pickerell, was a postmaster.

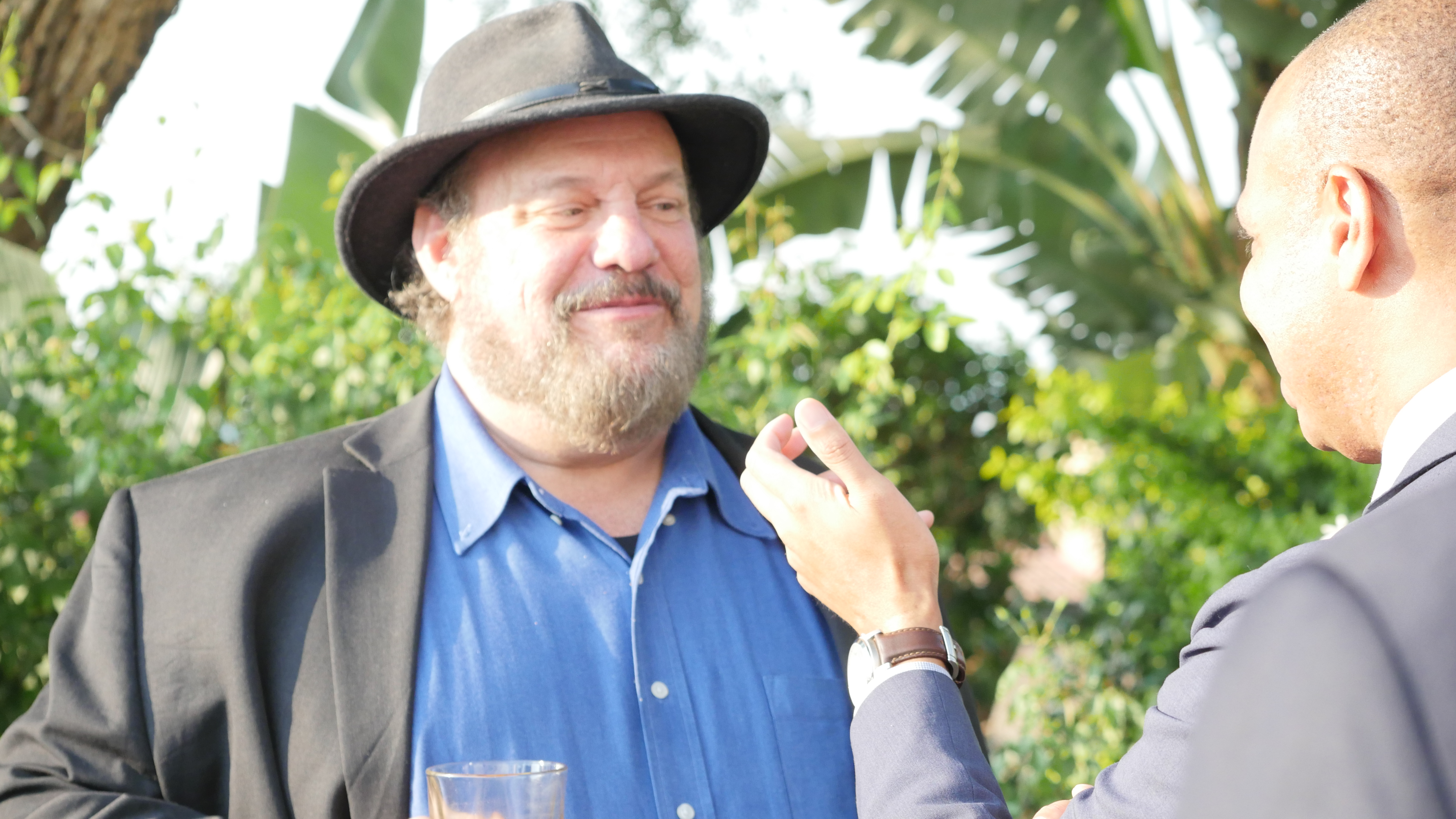

He attended the United States Military Academy at West Point from 1974 to 1978, where he earned a Bachelor of Science in chemistry. He played on the 1974 Army Cadets football team his freshman year. After graduating, he served 11 years in the United States Army. He received a master's degree in chemical engineering from the University of Louisville while in the army.

== Career ==
After leaving the army in 1989, Pickerell became a chemical engineer and distilling consultant at Ro-Tech in Louisville, Kentucky. In 1994, he joined Maker's Mark bourbon as a corporate vice president and master distiller and was with the company for 14 years. Over Pickerell's 14 years at Maker's Mark, annual sales increased from 175,000 cases to nearly one million.

After leaving Maker's Mark, he established a consulting firm called Oak View Spirits, where he advised over 100 other distilleries. His wide-ranging influence in the industry earned him the sobriquets "Founding Father of the Craft Distilling Movement" and the "Johnny Appleseed" of craft distilling. He worked with WhistlePig, a small manufacturer of rye whiskey, and was part of the group that restored George Washington's distillery in Mount Vernon, Virginia. Other distilleries he worked with include Watershed Distillery, Copper Fox Distillery, J. Rieger & Co., and Garrison Brothers Distillery. In 2010, Pickerell became involved with Hillrock Estate Distillery in New York's Hudson Valley region, where he served as Master Distiller until his death.

In 2018, he worked with metal band Metallica to release a product called Blackened American Whiskey. The aging process includes the application of low-frequency sound waves to the brew which broadcast the band's songs. According to the band, each run of 5,000 bottles has a different playlist.

== Personal life ==
Pickerell married Jeannette Harvie, with whom he had four children. He died of hypertensive heart failure on November 1, 2018, in San Francisco, California.
