= WhistlePig =

Whiskey distillery based in Vermont, USA

- Founded: c. 2007; 19 years ago
- Founder: Raj Bhakta
- Headquarters: 2139 Quiet Valley Rd., Shoreham, Vermont
- Key people: Alex M. Roberts (CEO)
- Products: Whiskey, esp. rye whiskey
- Website: whistlepigwhiskey.com

WhistlePig is a whiskey distillery based in Vermont. The distillery primarily makes rye whiskey. WhistlePig dates to 2007, when entrepreneur Raj Bhakta purchased land for the WhistlePig distillery. The whiskey brand was launched in 2010, and its first product, its 10-year rye, was released in 2015.

== Property and operations ==
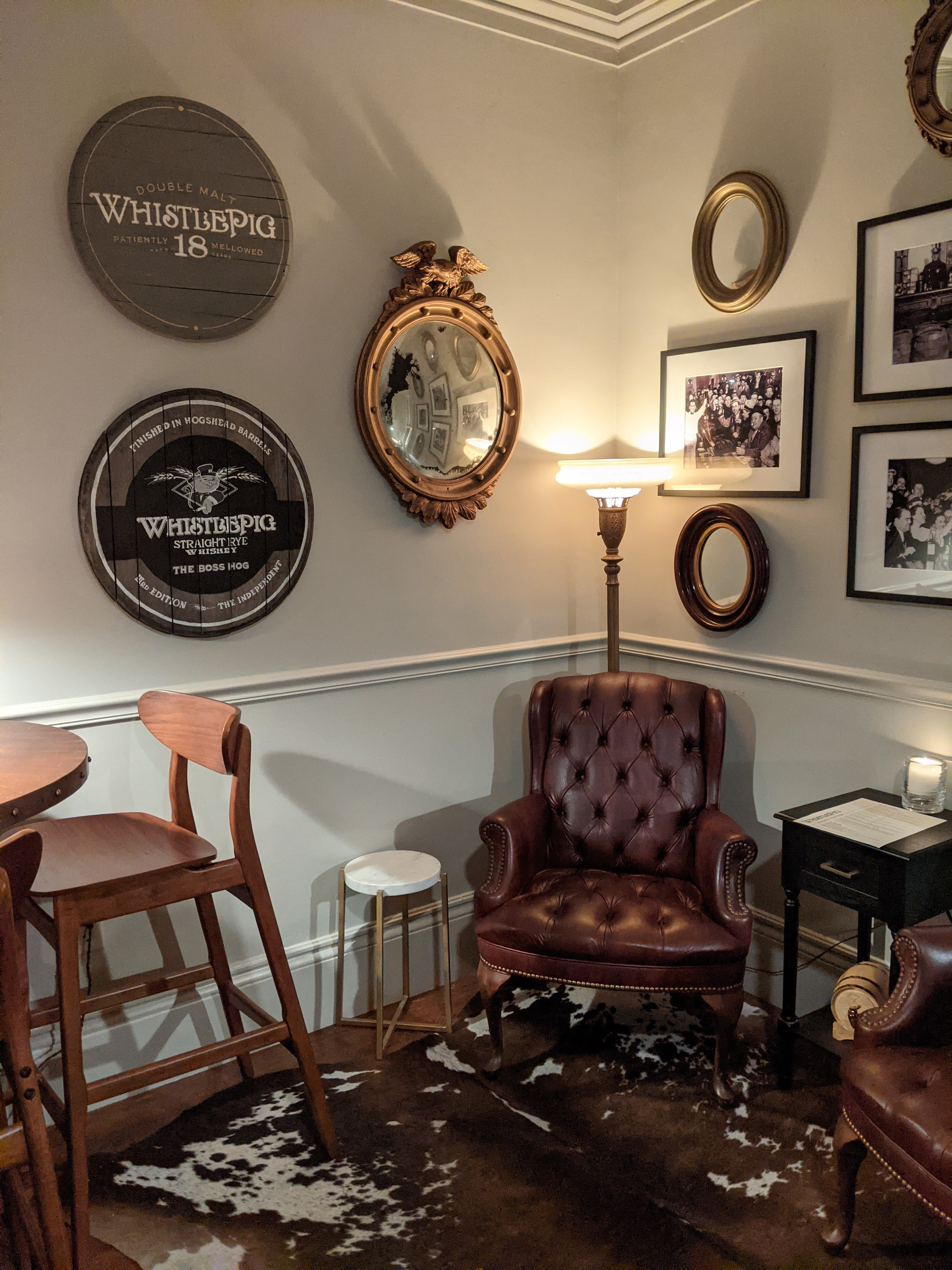
Interior of WhistlePig's tasting room in Quechee, Vermont

WhistlePig's distillery is in Shoreham, Vermont. It is not open to the public. It has two pot stills, each 750 US gallons (2,800 L; 620 imp gal).

The property includes a 500-acre (200 ha) farm. The land was formerly a dairy farm, about 150 years old. About 300 of those acres are dedicated to growing rye grain, about 200 hold maple trees for making syrup, while the remainder is used for corn, barley, oak trees, and space for livestock: pigs, sheep, goats, horses, and bees.

Two Kunekune pigs are kept on the property: Mortimer Junior and Orwell, both second-generation pigs. The first generation, Mortimer and Mauve, died in 2014 and 2018. Their cremated remains are held in a granite obelisk memorial on the farm property, and the distillery's two stills are named for them. The brand's logo reflects these pigs with a design of a plump, grinning pig, donning a top hat and bow tie.

WhistlePig's lead distiller is Emily Harrison and its chief blender is Meghan Ireland. Dave Pickerell was the master distiller, who introduced the company to its initial stock of Canadian whiskey, helped design the company's first blend, and designed its first pot still.

The company operates tasting rooms in Quechee, Vermont, and "the WhistlePig Pavilion" at Stowe Mountain Resort. It formerly operated tasting rooms at the distillery and in Waterbury Center, Vermont. The Quechee tasting room, a "whiskey parlor", opened in 2021. It involved WhistlePig and Simon Pearce purchasing the former Parker House tavern, with the tasting room opening soon after.

== History ==
In 2007, entrepreneur Raj Bhakta purchased land in Shoreham, Vermont, on which he built a new distillery and aging facility for his WhistlePig brand of rye whiskey. The brand was officially launched in 2010.

It was initially launched as a non-distiller producer that bottled a stock of 10-year-old Canadian whiskey from the Alberta Premium distillery owned by Fortune Brands in Alberta, Canada. Starting in 2007, Bhakta purchased land in Shoreham, Vermont, on which he built a new distillery and aging facility for the brand. The brand was officially launched in 2010.

WhistlePig hired master distiller Dave Pickerell to source its first whiskey. Bottling began in Shoreham in 2009, with production beginning in 2015. The company installed a second still in 2019. The first whiskey was released to the public in 2015, the 10-year small batch rye.

Bhakta retired from the company in 2017 and, in 2019, sold his shares and fully exited the company.

In 2021, WhistlePig began to sell a bourbon, Beyond Bonded, as well as an Irish whiskey, Limavady Irish Whiskey. In 2022, the company released a non-alcoholic whiskey, which uses its 6-year-aged PiggyBack Rye.

In 2023, WhistlePig launched their oldest aged whiskey yet at the time, the 21-year Béhôlden.

In 2024, WhistlePig introduced The Badönkådonk, a 25-year release finished in Silver Oak Cabernet barrels (SRP US$1,999.99).

In 2025, the company announced The BigShǝBàng, a 30-year single malt finished in Vin Santo barrels (SRP US$4,999), described by the brand as its oldest, rarest, and most expensive whiskey to date.

The company partnered with Liquid Death in 2025 to collaborate on a new wheat whiskey, Gravestock, that is proofed with Liquid Death Mountain Water and finished in casket-shaped barrels.

The WhistlePig PiggyBack, a bar in downtown Louisville, opened in the summer of 2025.

In 2026, WhistlePig introduced a 10-year-old bourbon finished in rye casks and bottled at 100 proof. The whiskey was previewed at the 2026 Kentucky Bourbon Festival and made available exclusively at The Vault in Louisville, Kentucky, with a national release planned for 2027.

== Products ==
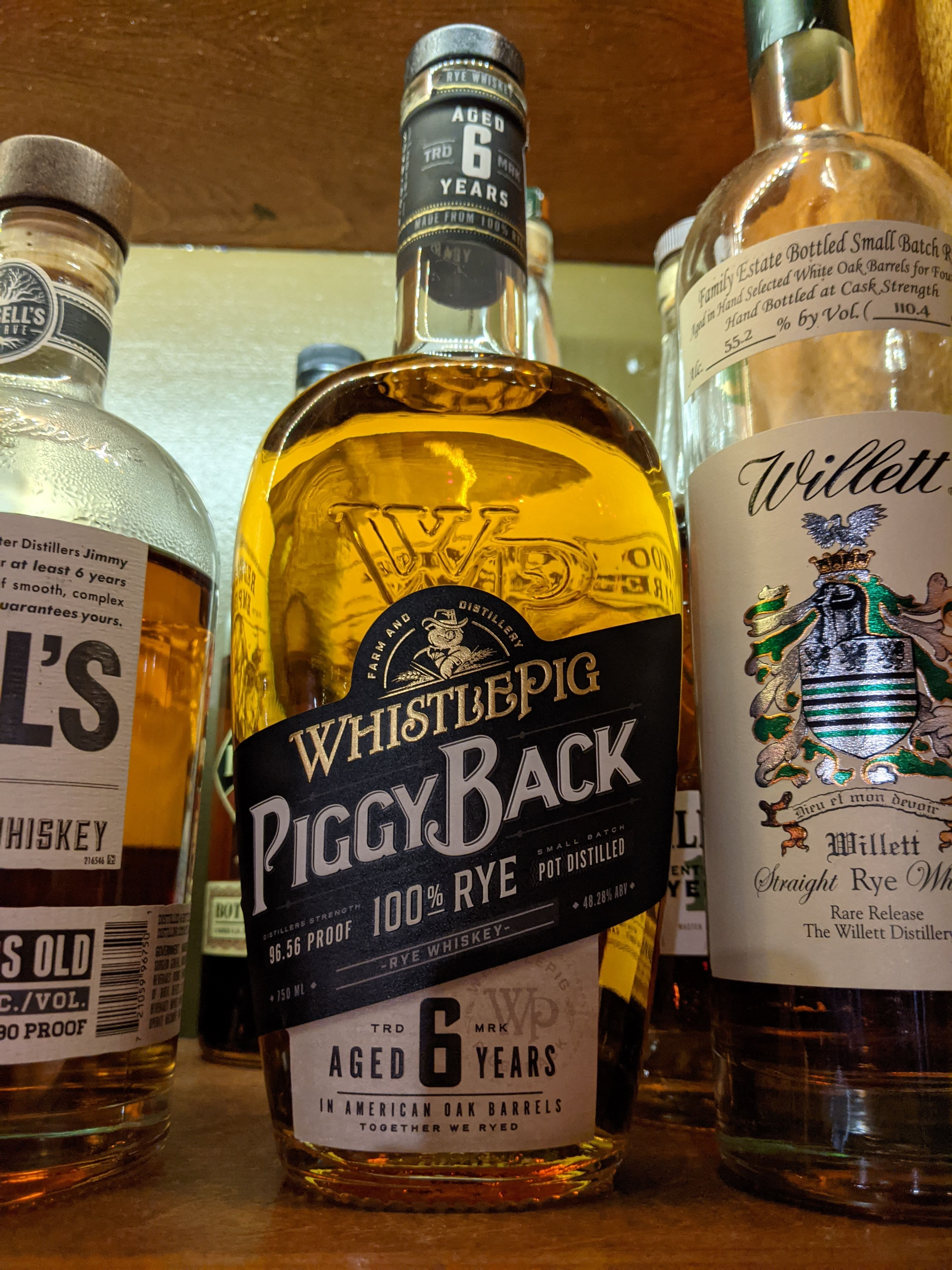
PiggyBack Rye bottle

Notable products include:

- PiggyBack Rye, a 6-year-aged rye made for mixing in cocktails. It was designed with elements honoring Dave Pickerell, as it was his last product before his death. It was WhistlePig's first rye made with 100 percent rye grains.
- PiggyBack Bourbon, a 6-year-aged bourbon first released in 2022. The bourbon has a high-corn mashbill and spends six years in barrels with a #3 char. It is bottled at 100-proof.
- Farmstock Rye, a blend of three different whiskeys: 6-year Canadian, 10-year Canadian, and rye made on-site. First released in 2017, it was the first WhistlePig product primarily made from whiskey made on-site, and used wood barrels and water from the property.
- 10-year "Small Batch", the first product released by the company.
- 12-year "Old World Cask Finish", finished in Port, Sauternes, and Madeira barrels.
- 15-year "Estate Oak Rye", aged for 15 years in new American oak, with up to a year aging in oak barrels made with oak grown on-site
- 18-year "Double Malt Rye", made in several editions. The second edition bottles came with stoppers made by Simon Pearce.
- The Boss Hog, a single-barrel, barrel-strength rye released every year in a new numerical edition.
  - The first edition, labeled "The Boss Hog", was released in 2013
  - The second edition, labeled "The Spirit of Mortimer"
  - The third edition, labeled "The Independent"
  - The fourth edition, "The Black Prince"
  - The fifth edition, "The Spirit of Mauve", was named in memory of one of the distillery's mascots, a pig named Mauve that died in 2018. The whiskey was aged for 13 years and finished in ex-Calvados barrels. The bottles come in coffin-shaped boxes and are topped with Danforth pewter stoppers depicting Mauve ascending to heaven. The whiskey has notes of cooked apple, cinnamon, ginger, rye spice, peaches, and hay.
  - The sixth edition, labeled "六: The Samurai Scientist", was a collaboration with Kitaya Sake Brewery in Japan. It was one of the first American whiskeys finished in umeshu barrels, formerly holding an eleven-year-aged liqueur made with ume (Japanese plums). The whiskey is made with koji fermentation. The spirit was the first Boss Hog product released since Dave Pickerell's death. Flavor notes include rye spice, citrus, tobacco, baking spices, and caramel. The bottle toppers depict Takamine Jōkichi, a Japanese chemist, in samurai armor.
  - The seventh edition, "Magellan's Atlantic", was aged for 17 years in American oak and finished in Spanish oak and in South American teak, in reference to explorer Ferdinand Magellan's expedition which took him from Spain to South America. The whiskey has a dessert-like flavor and aroma, including baking spices, orange, vanilla, and cherry.
  - The eighth edition, "LapuLapu's Pacific", was aged in seven-year-old rum casks for four weeks, followed by 10 days of aging in decade-old rum barrels from the Philippines. The process adds sweet, floral, and tropical fruit notes to the peppery and spicy rye whiskey. The whiskey is named for Lapulapu, an indigenous Filipino, considered the country's first hero after driving away Magellan's armed crew and killing the explorer. The bottle's pewter topper has a miniature statue of Lapulapu.
  - The ninth edition, "Siren's Song", is named for the song of the sirens, featured in Greek mythology. The whiskey is finished with Greek fig nectar and tentura, a Greek liqueur. The added ingredients are either local or Greek in origin. WhistlePig describes its tasting notes as floral, with dried fruit, brown sugar, black cherry, and fig.
- 21-year "Béhôlden", single-malt whiskey. Only 18 barrels were made with floral and fruity notes.

Given the years necessary to age whiskey, a portion of WhistlePig's whiskey is outsourced. Suppliers include MGP of Indiana and the Alberta Premium distillery owned by Fortune Brands in Alberta, Canada. Instead, the company focuses on barrel-aging and finishing for these products.

== WhistlePig's Louisville, Kentucky Outpost ==
In September 2025, WhistlePig announced details of a Louisville, Kentucky location at 403 E. Market Street—originally unveiled as "PiggyBank" and now known as "The Vault". The space incorporates a historic bank vault and will include a "Big Pig Bar", retail offerings, exclusive tastings, special events, and rare whiskey collections.
