= Chornyi Lis =

Chornyi Lis Ukrainian: Чорний Ліс
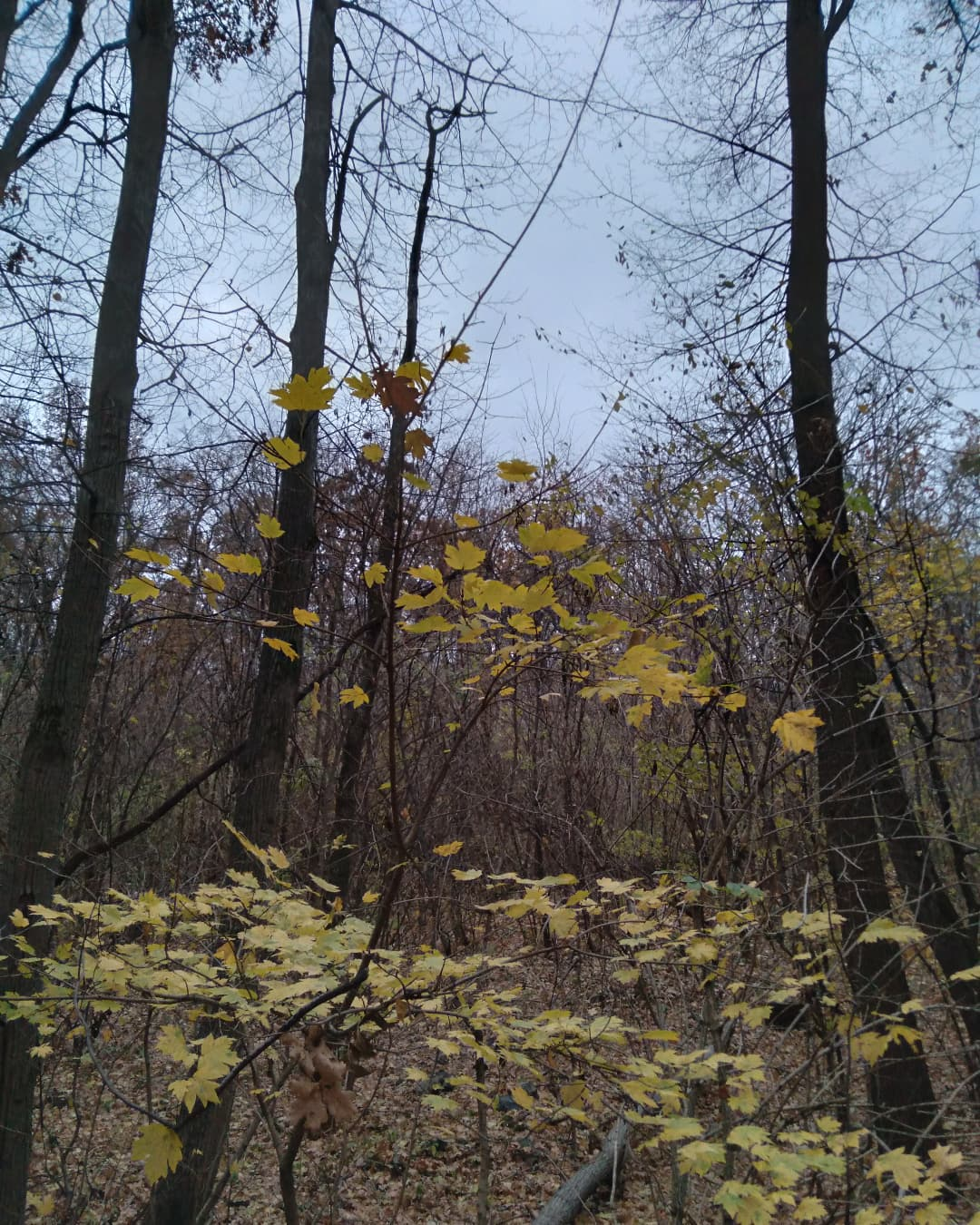

- Location within Ukraine Kirovohrad Oblast Location within Ukraine

Geography
- Location: Kirovohrad Oblast, Ukraine
- Coordinates: 48°46′28″N 32°32′40″E
- Area: 90,000 ha (220,000 acres)

Chornyi Lis (Ukrainian: Чорний Ліс lit. 'Black Forest') is a major forest area in the territory of former Oleksandrivka Raion in Kirovohrad Oblast of Ukraine. It is known as the southernmost broadleaf forest in Ukraine.

== Geography and geology ==
Chornyi Lis is located on a high dissected plateau at the watershed of Inhul and Inhulets rivers, on the border between the steppe and forest steppe zones. Geologically, it belongs to the Ukrainian Shield formation. It covers an area of around 90,000 hectares. Local vegetation is dominated by hornbeam, with ash and elm admixtures on the outskirts.

== History ==
Around 10,000 years ago, the southern border of glaciation ran near the area of Chornyi Lis.

The toponym "Chornyi Lis" is mentioned on the maps by Guillaume Le Vasseur de Beauplan. During the 18th century, Chornyi Lis belonged to lands of the Zaporozhian Sich. It served as a base of haidamak outfits, which engaged in raids against Polish-Lithuanian territories. Later the forest became a part of New Serbia.

The area's rugged terrain provided a suitable cover for partisan activities. During the Ukrainian War of Independence, Chornyi Lis served as a base of insurgents fighting against the Soviet regime, part of whom moved from the nearby Kholodnyi Yar.

In 1926 the Ukrainian Committee of Natural Monuments Protection issued an appeal to authorities, proposing to create a nature reserve in Chornyi Lis. In 2009 activists of the Kirovohrad Oblast branch of the All-Ukrainian Ecology League initiated the creation of a national park in the area.

On 11 August 2026 a national nature park was created in the forest tract of Chornyi Lis according to a decree signed by the President of Ukraine. It became the eighth area in Ukraine to be subordinated to the State Agency of Forest Resources of Ukraine.

== Natural environment ==
Chornyi Lis is known for an almost total absence of invasive species. Numerous rare plants and animals are abundant in the area, for example oak, lime tree, cleavers, badger, fox, roe deer, wild boar, stag beetle and longhorn beetle.

== Gallery ==
Lake Berestuvate

Swamp area in Chornyi Lis during summer

Chornyi Lis in autumn

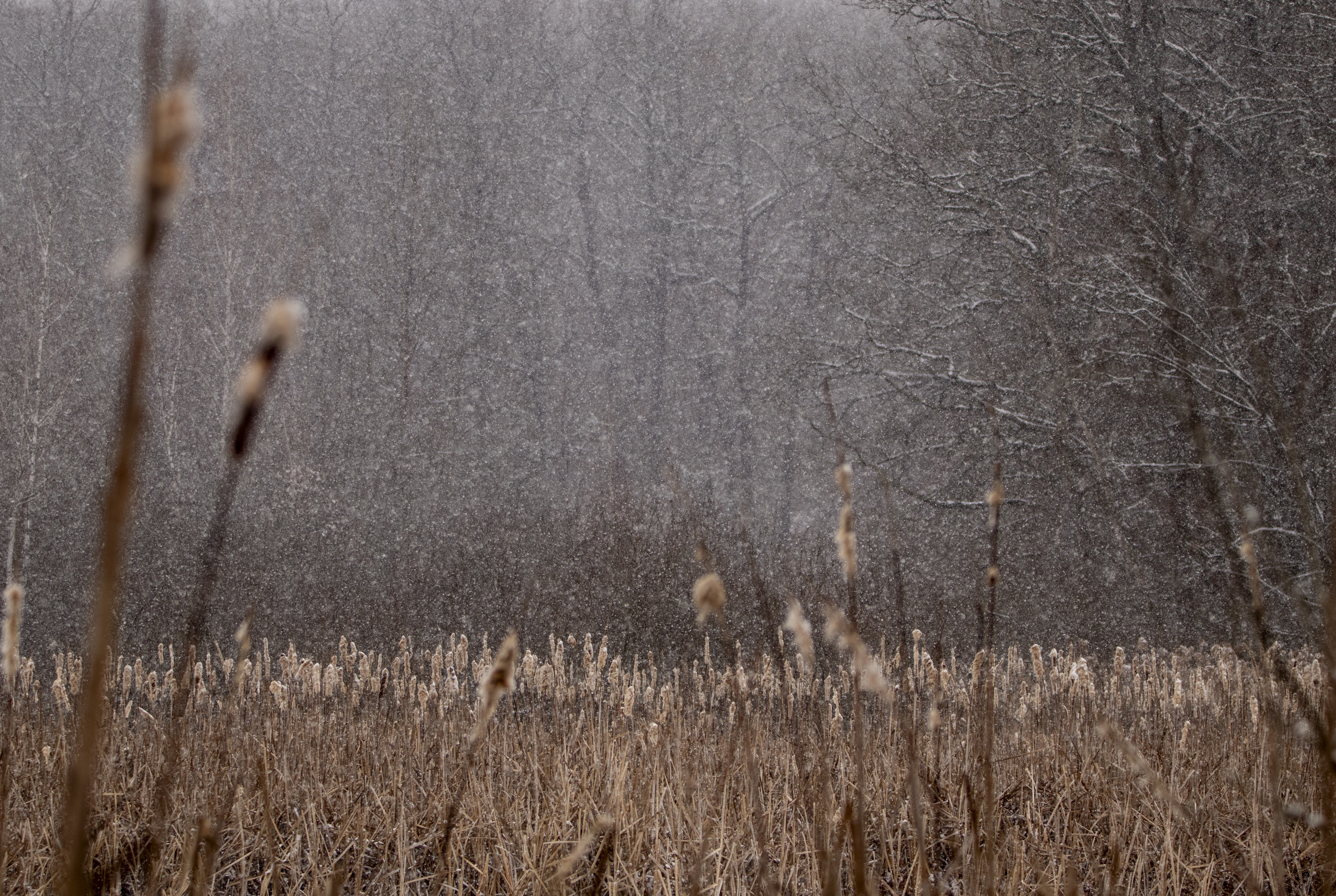
Chornyi Lis in winter

== See also ==
- Chornyi Lis Republic
