= Nocino =

Walnut liqueur

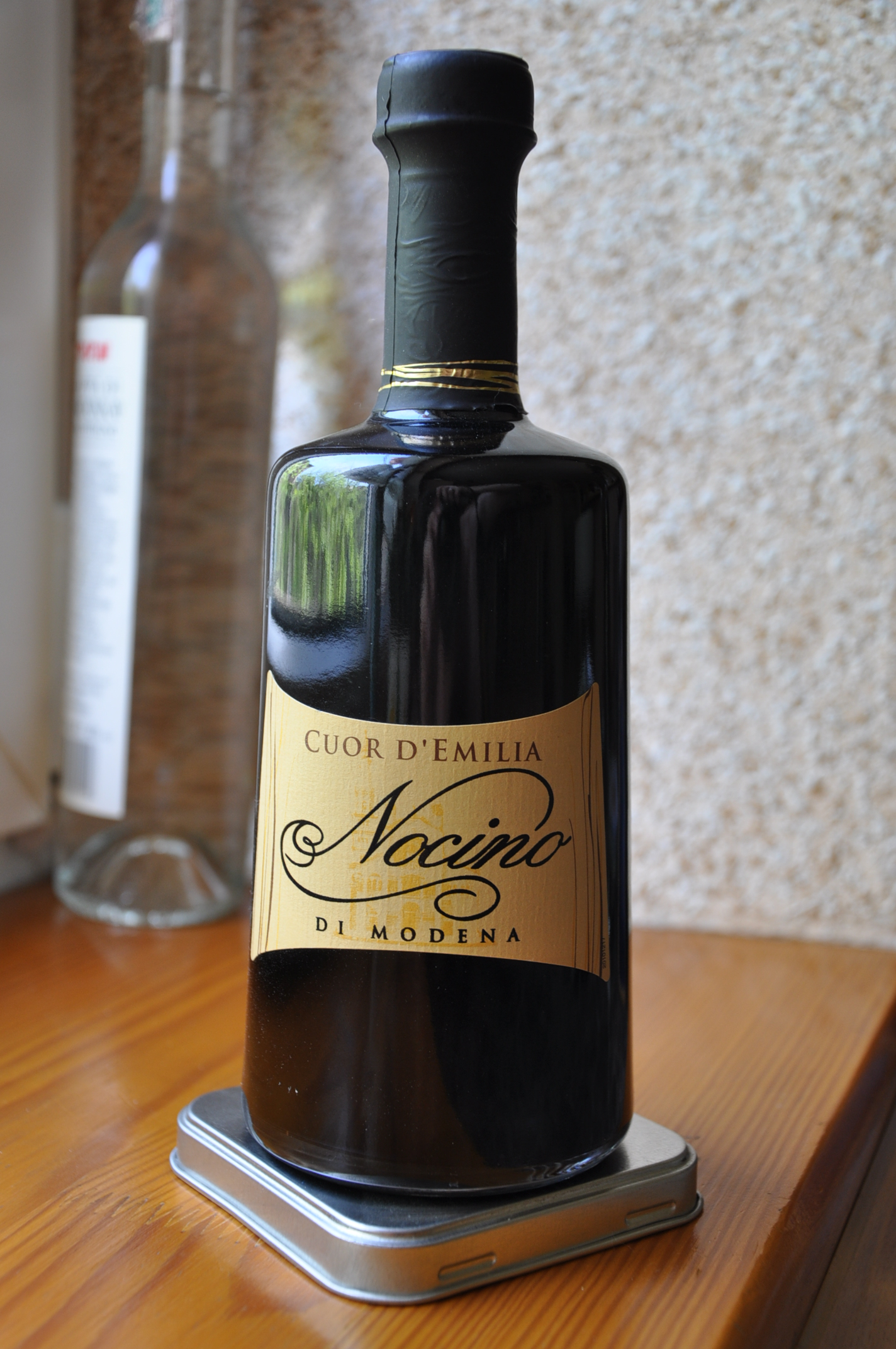
Nocino

Nocino is a dark brown liqueur from the Emilia-Romagna region of Italy. It is made from unripe green walnuts. The walnuts and the liquor are handled using ceramic or wooden tools (to avoid oxidation) and placed in an alcoholic base. After steeping in spirit, the walnuts are removed, and the alcohol is mixed with simple syrup. Nocino has an aromatic but bittersweet flavor. It may be homemade; villages and even individual families often have their own (oftentimes secret) recipes, including different additions like cinnamon, juniper berries, lemon or orange zest, vanilla pods, coffee beans, or clove. Producers lightly add spices to avoid overpowering the walnuts' flavor. A classic base consists of vodka. Nocino is also available commercially in bottled form. Commercially available nocino is typically 40 percent alcohol by volume, or 80 proof.

== History ==
According to Roman historians, the nocino actually was born in Great Britain. The earliest records are related to the Picts, and the Romans also recorded the strange traditions of these people on June 24, when they drank a very special brew, and they said they could talk with goblins, elves and goddesses. When the Romans made Christianity the official religion of the Empire (in 313 AD), these ancient rites, in order to survive, had to be "translated" into the tradition of the Bible. Thus, they became associated with St. John the Baptist, who, according to the tradition, was born on the summer solstice.

While references to nocino often hail its ancient or Medieval roots, extant documentation is lacking. Conrad Gessner offered a potential exception in his 1552 book The Treasure of Euonymus. Peter Morwen's translation of Gessner's Latin text states, "The water of walnuts not rype made aboute saint Ihons tyde, ministred without, is good for woundes and hoat byles, and the pestilent anthrax. Also being dronke a two or thre vnces, it cooleth and resisteth the pestilence." Gessner's conception of this medicinal drink contains important components of nocino. "Water" likely refers to a distillation. Unripe walnuts should be collected on Saint John's Tide (June 24).

Nicholas Culpeper wrote, "The young green nuts taken before they be half ripe and preserved with sugar, are of good use for those who have weak stomachs." He also mentions that an ounce or two of a distillation of the same age of husk is used to "cool the heat of agues and resist the infection of the plague".

This drink or potion made its way to Celtic France and to this day, a similar drink called liqueur or Brou De Noix is made in many French regions. At some point, this practice of infusing green walnuts reached the Italian peninsula, where it became known as Nocino or, in the case of Piedmont, Ratafià Di Noci (walnut ratafià).

During the Middle Ages, Italian monasteries used Nocino for its medicinal properties and also as an alcoholic treat.

Ordine del Nocino Modenese is an association of Spilamberto, province of Modena, Emilia-Romagna, Italy, which, since 1978, promotes the traditional Nocino of Modena.

However, global warming has started to affect the ripening process, and in certain areas walnuts are already too ripe for Nocino on 24 June. The ideal time to harvest walnuts is before they have hardened. Depending on local temperature, walnuts may need to be harvested earlier, such as on 14 or 15 June instead of 24 June.

== Availability ==
Nocino is also produced in New Zealand by NewZino, under the name NutZino Walnut Liqueur and in Australia by Timboon Railway Shed Distillery in Timboon, Victoria and Osare - Liquori della Tasmania in Hobart, Tasmania. A handful of craft distillers have started producing the liqueur in the United States, notably Long Road Distillers in Grand Rapids, Michigan and Watershed Distillery in Columbus, Ohio. In Canada, craft distillery, The Woods Spirit Co. offers both traditional and barrel aged Nocino.

Walnut liquor is also produced in Romania and Moldova by Pomul Regal and Nucata.life, where it is called Nucată and used both recreationally and as a digestive. Besides walnuts, the recipe includes various combinations of additional flavors, such as anise, black pepper, lemon peel, orange peel, nutmeg, or vanilla pods. When making walnut liquor, Romanians sometimes set aside some of the softer walnuts to make walnut jam as well, since in June the walnuts are suitable for both uses. In Romania, walnut liquor is sometimes made in autumn as well, out of the green husks of 15–18 walnuts.

In Slovenia walnut liquor is known as orehovec and is flavored with coffee, while in Croatia, it is known as Orahovac and it is flavored with orange, lemon, and vanilla. In Serbia, it is called orahovača; it is widely made in homes in the villages and is considered to be very good for health.

== See also ==
- List of liqueur brands
- Nocello
