= Chornyy Lis Republic =

Short-lived country in modern day Ukraine

The Chornyi Lis Republic (Ukrainian: Республіка Чорного Лісу, romanized: Respublika Chornoho Lisu, lit. 'Republic of the Black Forest') was a short lived state in modern-day Ukraine that existed in 1919–1922 during the Russian Civil War. It encompassed the area of what is now Oleksandrivka in Kirovohrad Oblast, and its capital was Tsvitne.

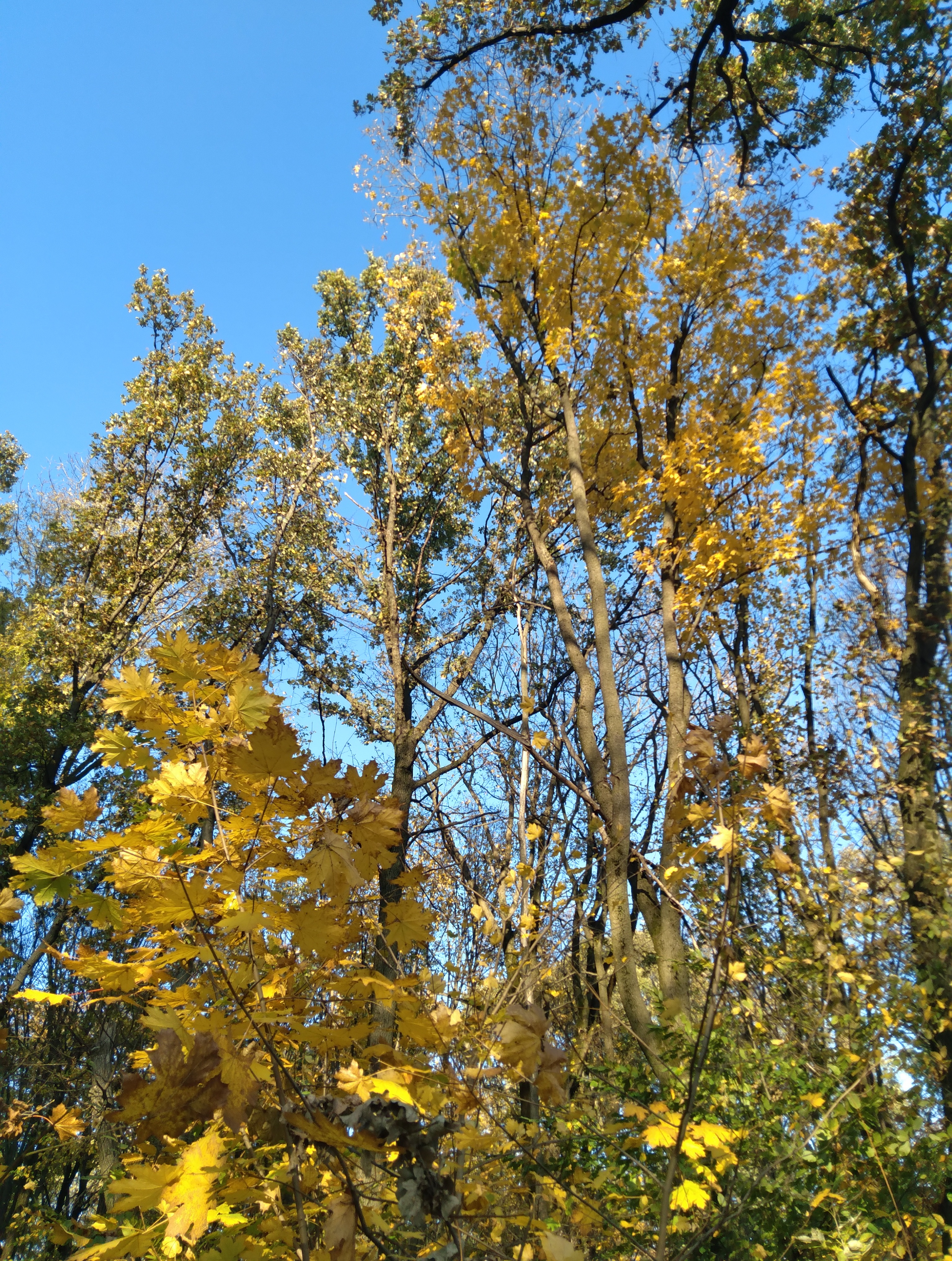
Plants in the Chornyi Lis

== History ==
During the Ukrainian People's Republic, which lasted from 1918 to 1923, Chornyi Lis was allied with the Kholodny Yar Republic, a fellow microstate. These two states are listed among at least two dozen "peasant republics" in Ukraine alone during the Russian Civil War.

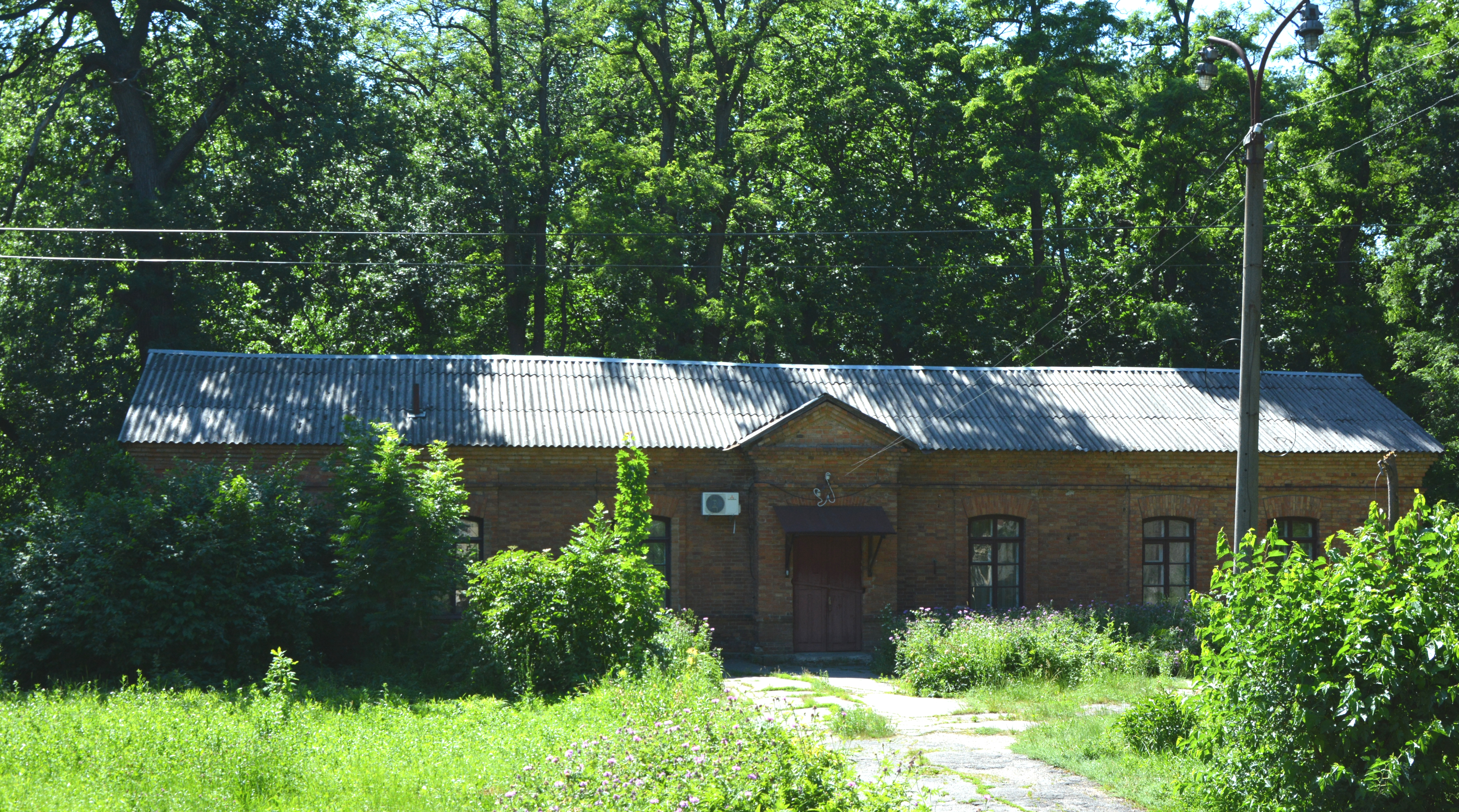
One of the buildings in the Chornyi Lis. It was used as a hospital to treat wounded Bolsheviks, Whites, and soldiers of the UPR. It was also used as headquarters during the Ukrainian–Soviet War.

The Republic was led by rulers called otamans, named after Cossack rulers. Until 1921, Otamans Philip Khmara and Mykola Kibets-Bondarenko led the rebellion. Otaman Denis Gupalo was the leader in 1922. In 1920, as a result of the Red Terror, the Znamianka Uprising was launched, led by these otamans.

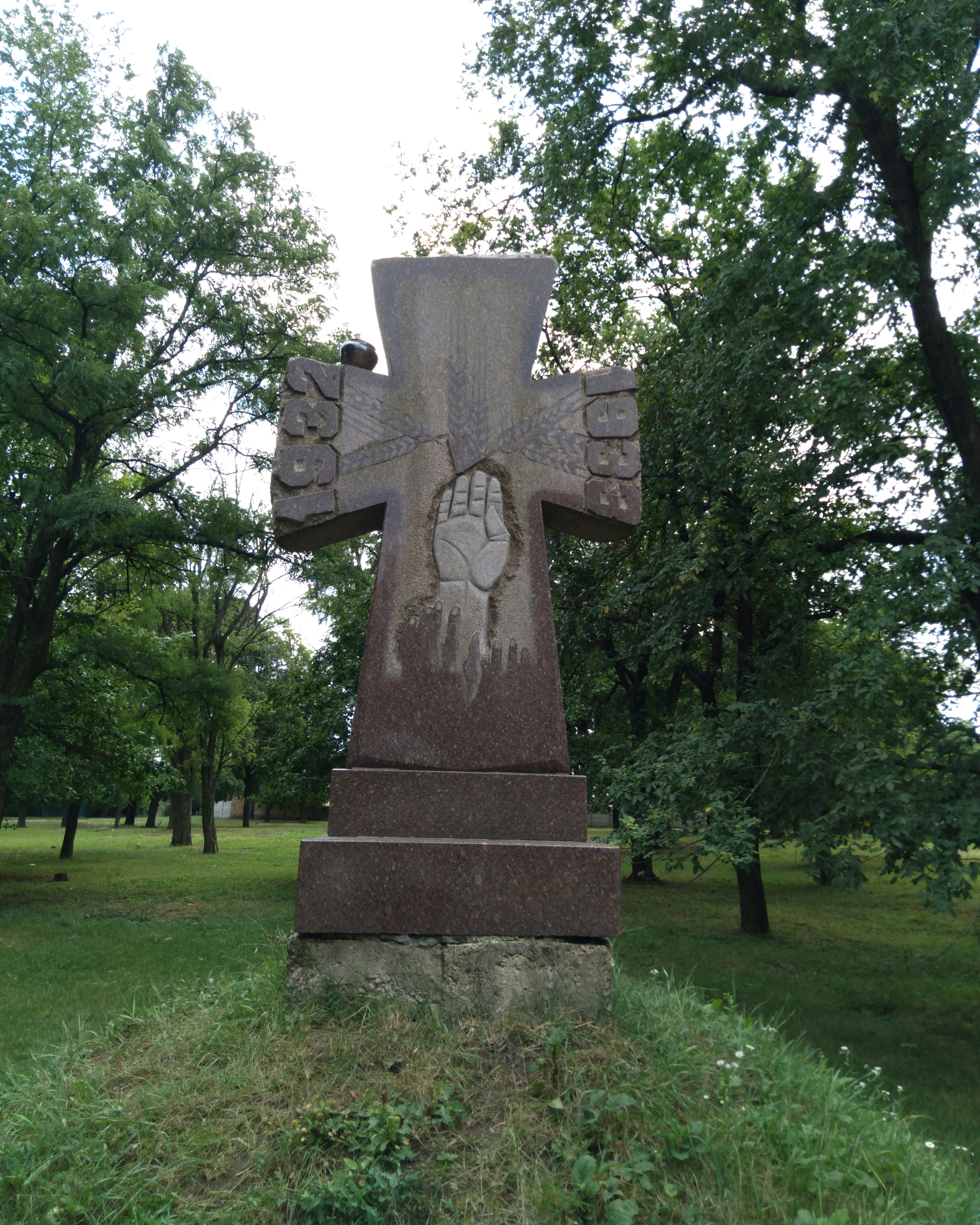
Monument in Znamianka dedicated to victims of the Holodomor and the victims of political repression in the Soviet Union, including the fighters of Chornyi Lis. It was erected after the Dissolution of the Soviet Union.

The otamans enjoyed significant support from the locals. Due to fact that the otamans were hard to defeat, the Cheka launched a special operation to hunt down and capture the otamans and their supporters.

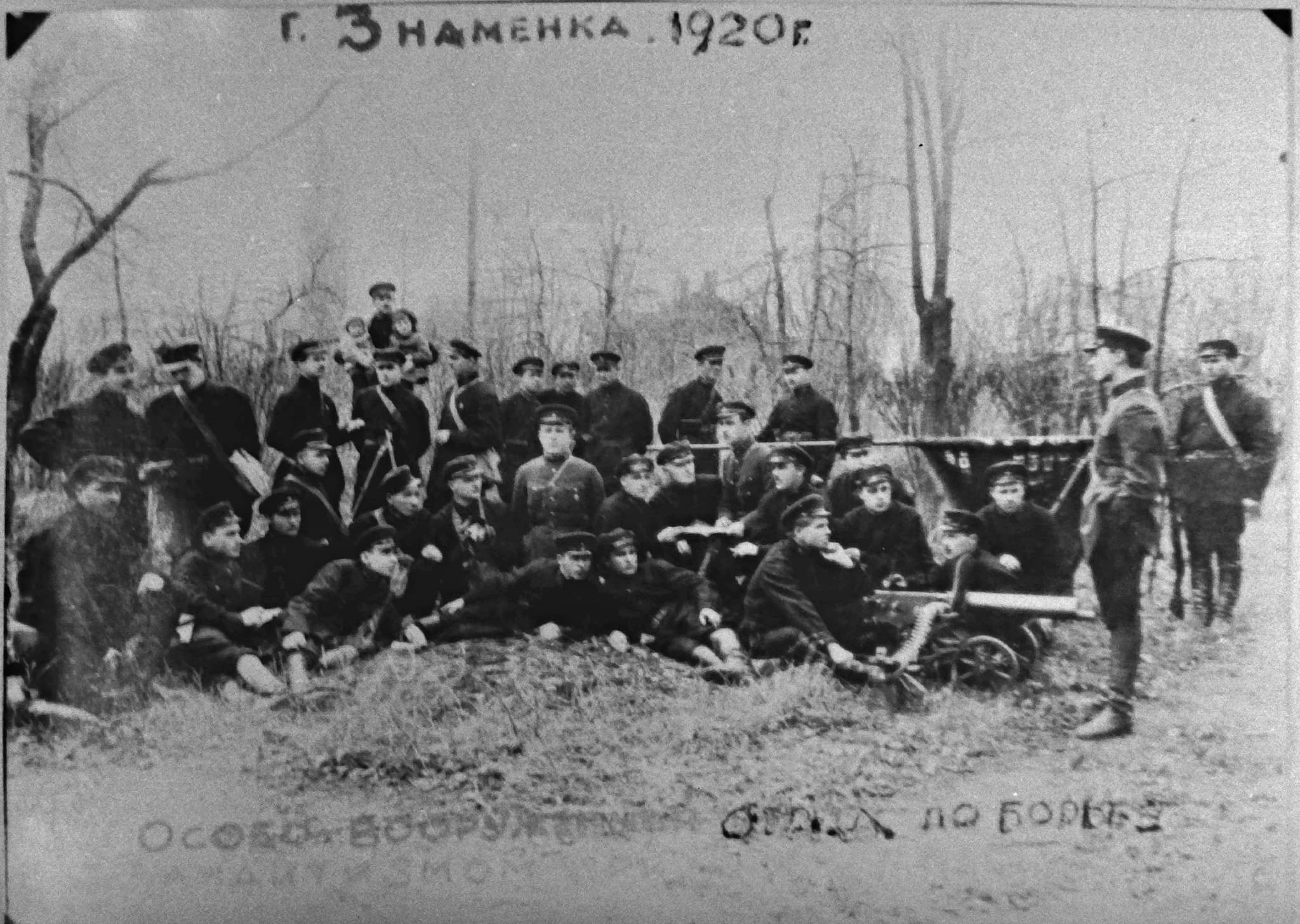
Soviet troops in Znamianka conducting a "cleansing operation" of enemy fighters from the Chornyi Lis (picture dates to around 1920)

By the end of September 1922, most of the leaders of both Chornyi Lis and Kholodny Yar were arrested by the Cheka. They were caught in Zvenyhorodka, attending a fake conference of local rebel leaders that was actually set up by Cheka infiltrators.

However, even as most of the otamans were caught, the Chekist "Sotnik Zavyryukha", a fake rebel group, continued to operate across the Chornyi Lis and Kholodny Yar, capturing remaining rebels that resisted after the arrest of their commanders. By 1923, the last rebels were cleared out.

Many people who experienced the era of the republics were killed during Stalinist repressions, and the local communist authorities destroyed evidence. In the later years of the USSR, the remaining information was classified by the Soviet Union. In 2008, it was declassified. Chornyi Lis was listed as part of the Green Army in those records.

== Sources ==
- http://ukrlife.org/main/evshan/reness3.htm
- http://www.golos.com.ua/article/1189080982.html
- http://www.vechirka.com.ua/history/xxcen/18111744.php
- http://www.ukrcenter.com/library/read.asp?id=419&page=4
- https://ukrajinskij-natsionalistichnij-r.webnode.com.ua/news/respubl%D1%96ka-chornogo-l%D1%96su/
- http://ndis.cdu.edu.ua/index.php/selianski-respubliky-1917-1921-rr
- https://vk.kr.ua/putivnyk/tourist-objects/natural/5897-chorniy-ls.html
