= Nocello =

Italian liqueur

Nocello is a walnut flavored liqueur from Italy. It is produced by the Toschi Vignola S.r.l. company of Savignano sul Panaro, province of Modena, Emilia-Romagna, Italy. The product originated in Emilia-Romagna. It is labeled "Imitation Liqueur" in the United States and is 24% alcohol by volume. The liqueur is sweet with a rounded and balanced walnut flavour with vanilla tones. Nocello is similar in taste to Frangelico. In 2004 Nocello was awarded a gold medal at the IWSC (International Wine and Spirit Competition, UK) competition for nut liquors. Similar liqueurs have "been produced since medieval times and used as medicine".

== See also ==
- List of liqueur brands
- Nocino
