= List of bow tie wearers =

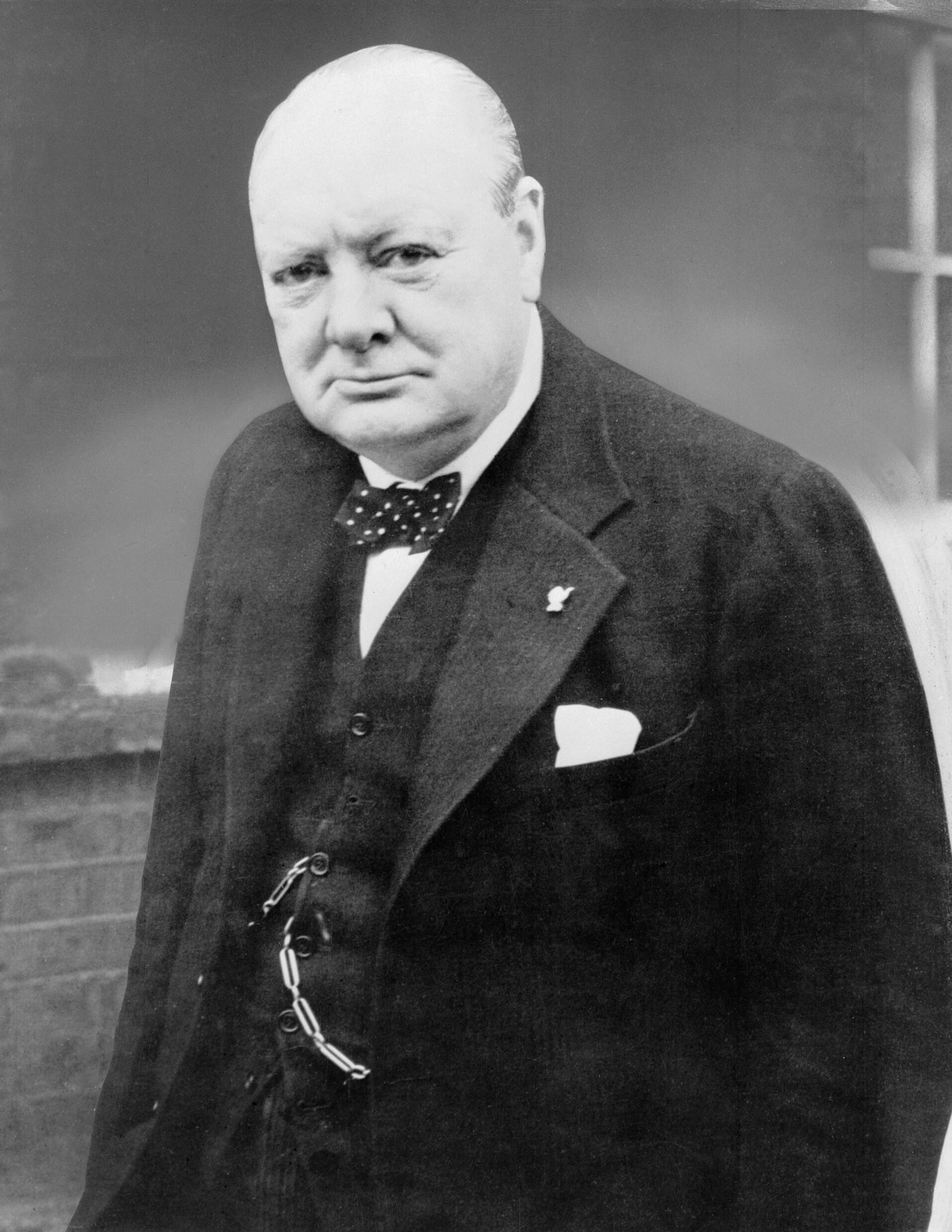
Winston Churchill was often photographed wearing a polka dot bow tie.

This is a list of notable bow tie wearers, real and fictional; notable people for whom the wearing of a bow tie (when not in formal dress) is also a notable characteristic.

Bow tie wearing can be a notable characteristic for an individual. Men's clothier Jack Freedman told The New York Times that wearing a bow tie "is a statement maker" that identifies a person as an individual because "it's not generally in fashion". Numerous writers and bow tie sellers have observed that the popularity of this type of neckwear can rise and fall with the fortunes of the well-known people who wear them.

Until the 20th century, the bow tie was the general rule for neckties. Starting in early 20th century, the bow tie started to become more rare.

In 1996, The Wall Street Journal quoted statistics from the Neckwear Association of America showing that bow ties represent three percent of the 100 million ties sold each year in the United States, most of them part of formal wear, such as for white tie and black tie.

== Attention to famous bow tie wearers in commerce and fashion commentary ==
Those who write about bow ties often mention famous people who wear or have worn them. These writers often make the point that the image conveyed to others by a bow tie can be affected by associations with celebrities and famous people in the past.

A common fashion accessory in the 19th century, the bow tie had positive associations by mid-20th century, bolstered by real-world personalities, including President Franklin Roosevelt and Sir Winston Churchill, as well as "devil-may-care" characters portrayed in films by actors, including Humphrey Bogart and Frank Sinatra. By the 1970s, however, the bow tie became associated with nerds and geeks, such as the slapstick characters played by Jerry Lewis, and Mayberry's fictional deputy sheriff, Barney Fife. This perception was reinforced by the bow tie's association with Pee-wee Herman and U.S. Senator Paul Simon.

The perceptions associated with bow ties started to take another turn in the 1980s, when Success Magazine's founder, W. Clement Stone, spoke out in support of the neck wear after the publication by fashion author John Molloy which observed, "Wear a bow tie and nobody will take you seriously." Stone associated bow-tie wearing with virility, aggressiveness, and salesmanship. In further defense of the bow tie, its use by figures such as Daniel Patrick Moynihan and Saul Bellow has been cited.

=== Celebrities' effect on bow-tie wearing ===
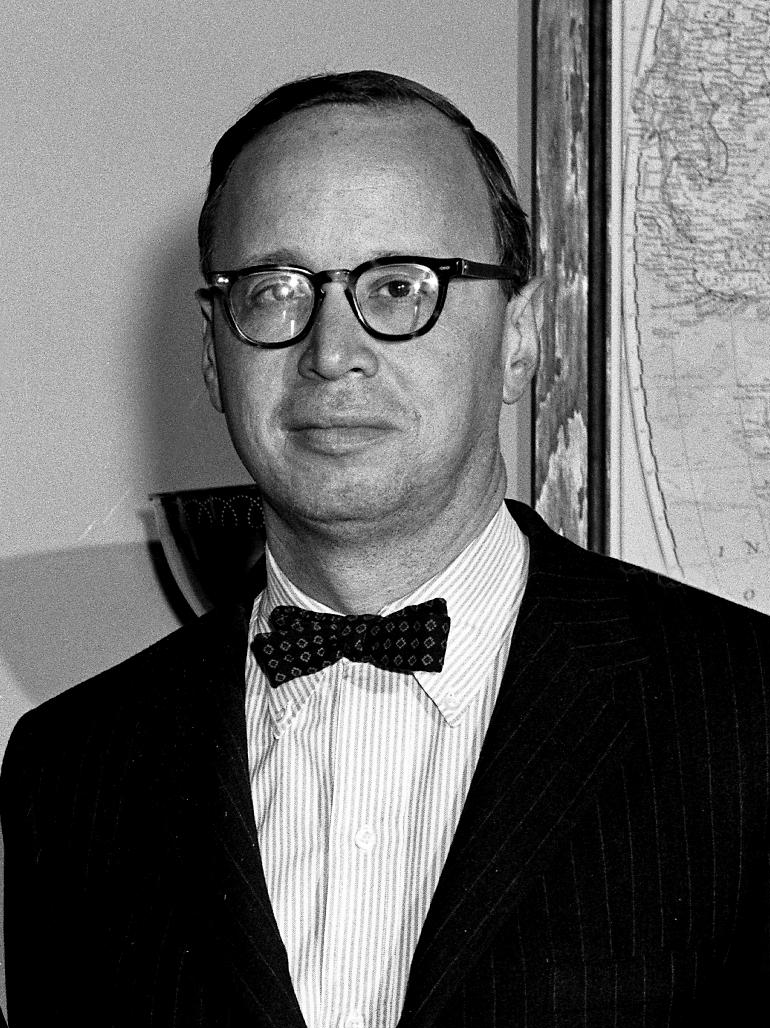
Historian Arthur Schlesinger Jr. wore a bow tie in the early 1960s, when he worked for U.S. President John F. Kennedy.

When a celebrity is noticed wearing a bow tie, it can affect bow tie sales; sales see an improvement when the accessory is associated with younger celebrities such as Tucker Carlson. When Raj Bhakta wore one during his stint on The Apprentice, haberdashers reported customers asking for a bow tie which looked like his. Similarly, after Matt Smith made his debut as the bow tie-wearing Eleventh Doctor in Doctor Who, Topman reported a significant increase in demand for bow ties (from 3% of all tie sales to 14%).

Arthur M. Schlesinger Jr. wrote about his decision as a college student to start wearing bow ties in his memoir A Life in the Twentieth Century: Innocent Beginnings, 1917–1950. Schlesinger remarked that he made his decision in part because a number of famous men he admired had a penchant for the neck wear. In addition, he noted that they prevent dinner mishaps, saying, "It is impossible, or at least it requires extreme agility, to spill anything on a bow tie."

=== Commercial interests using famous wearers to encourage sales ===
Bow tie sellers often cite famous people who have worn the neckwear as a way of encouraging more customers. Jack Cutone, co-founder of Boston Bow Tie, noted that there is ample evidence to support the uniqueness and stature of those who wear bow ties, including Abraham Lincoln, Winston Churchill, Albert Einstein and Sigmund Freud. Beau Ties Ltd., an online bow tie seller, has featured a "C. Everett Koop bow tie," complete with an endorsement by Koop, who was Surgeon General of the United States during the Reagan administration. Carrot & Gibbs, another bow tie seller, lists several famous wearers on its bow tie web page.

== Bow tie wearers of the nineteenth century ==
Bow ties were conventional attire in the nineteenth century. Portraits of U.S. presidents from Van Buren through McKinley commonly show them in bow ties. Wearing of a bow tie was seldom commented upon and did not form part of the public perception of figures such as American inventor Thomas Edison.

== Bow tie wearers in the twentieth and twenty-first centuries ==
=== Architects ===
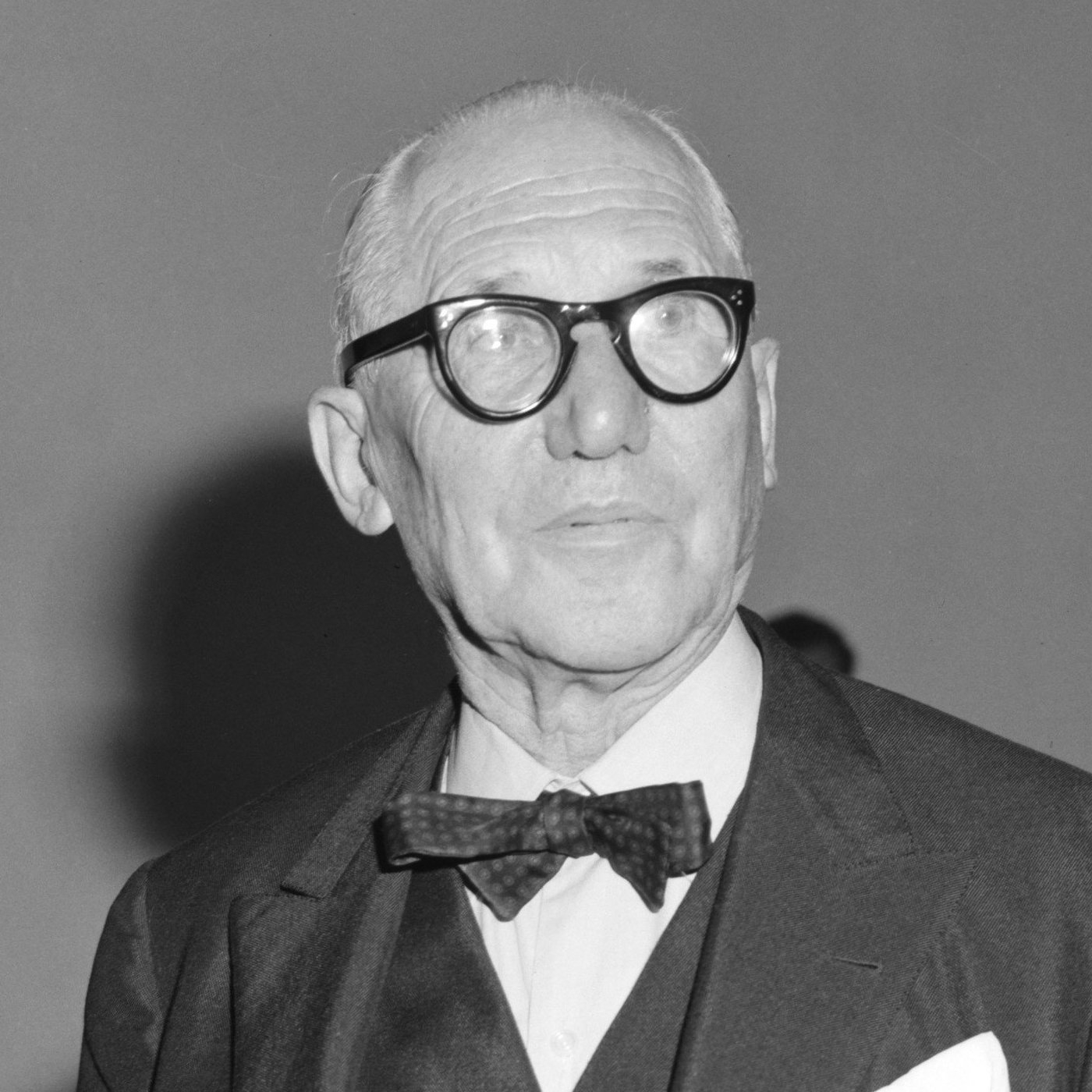
Le Corbusier, architect

- Le Corbusier (1887–1965), architect who wore "his trademark bow tie"
- Peter Eisenman (born 1932), architect and academic
- Walter Gropius (1883–1969), architect, six of whose bow ties are kept by Harvard
- Louis Kahn (1901/1902–1974), architect and academic
- Owen Luder (1928–2021), architect

=== Educators ===
==== College and university professors ====
- Leon Botstein (born 1946), president of Bard College
- George S. Bridges, former Whitman College and current Evergreen State College president
- George Campbell Jr. (born 1945), president of Cooper Union
- James E. Cofer, Fulbright Scholar and President of Missouri State University and the University of Louisiana at Monroe.
- Donald J. Cram, chemist, Nobel Prize laureate.
- Angus Deaton, Dwight D. Eisenhower Professor of Economics and International Affairs Emeritus at the Woodrow Wilson School of Public and International Affairs and the Economics Department at Princeton University, Nobel Memorial Prize in Economic Sciences laureate
- William Durden, president of Dickinson College
- E. Gordon Gee (born 1944), president of West Virginia University and former president of Vanderbilt University, Brown University, the University of Colorado at Boulder, and Ohio State University: "When E. Gordon Gee was fifteen years old, he made a defining sartorial decision. He began wearing a bow tie."
- Alexander Fleming (1881–1955), Scottish biologist, pharmacologist, Nobel Prize laureate
- Jerry Herron, dean of the Irvin D. Reid Honors College at Wayne State University
- Richard Hofstadter, American historian
- Eric R. Kandel (born 1929), neurobiology professor and Nobel Prize laureate with a "trademark bow tie"
- Fritz Albert Lipmann, German-American biochemist, Nobel Prize laureate.
- William Lipscomb, physicist, Nobel Prize laureate.
- R. Bowen Loftin (born 1949), chancellor of the University of Missouri. Quoted as saying "The similarity between Bowen and Bowtie tends to help people remember my name."
- Bohumil Makovsky, Director of Bands at Oklahoma A&M College
- Jean-Luc Marion, French philosopher
- Saeed Nafisi (born 1895), Iranian scholar
- Santa Ono (born 1962), President & Vice-Chancellor of The University of British Columbia, President Emeritus of University of Cincinnati, President of University of Michigan. Immunologist and vision researcher.
- Paul C. Pribbenow, president of Augsburg University.
- Paul Samuelson (1915–2009), professor emeritus of economics at the Massachusetts Institute of Technology and a Nobel Prize winner.
- Erwin Schrödinger, father of quantum physics
- Eugene H. Spafford, cybersecurity pioneer, professor at Purdue University, and founder of the CERIAS research institute.
- Edward C. Taylor, Princeton University Professor of Chemistry and inventor of certain chemotherapeutic pharmaceuticals.
- William E. Troutt, 19th president of Rhodes College in Memphis, Tennessee.
- Celâl Şengör, Turkish geologist

==== Other educators ====
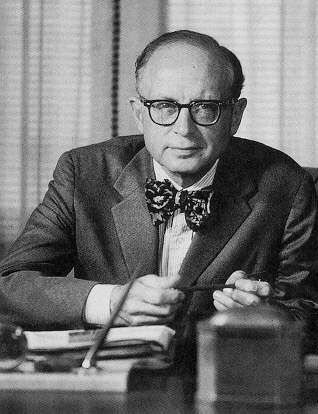
U.S. Librarian of Congress Daniel J. Boorstin wore a bow tie in this official photograph.

- Daniel J. Boorstin (1914–2004), U.S. historian, professor, attorney, writer, U.S. Librarian of Congress 1975-1987
- Bill Nye (born 1955), television science program host, is a "gangly guy in the blue lab coat and bow tie". On why he wears bow ties: "If you're working with liquid nitrogen and your tie falls into it, it's funny in a way to the audience but it's also — pun intended — a little bit of a pain in the neck."
- Alexander Oparin (1894–1980), Soviet biochemist notable for his contributions to the theory of the origin of life
- Murray Rothbard (1926–1995), libertarian economist and historian who "always wore a conservative suit and bow tie."
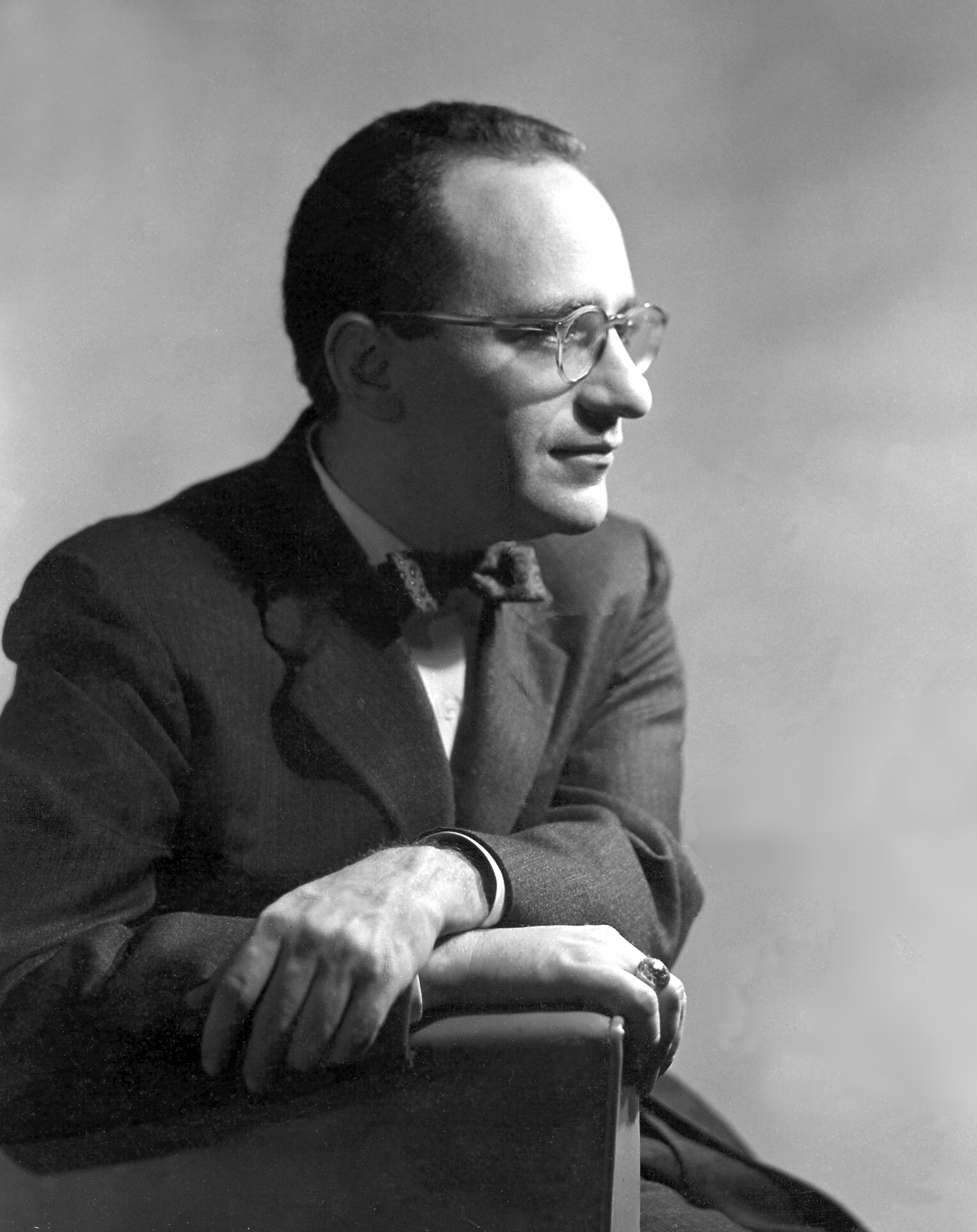
  Murray Rothbard, author of For a New Liberty
- Arthur Schlesinger, Jr. (1917–2007), "famed for his trademark bow ties"
- Chris Whittle (born 1947), founder of Channel One News and Edison Schools
- Peter Morici (born 1948) economist, political commentator and Professor of International Business at the R.H. Smith School of Business at the University of Maryland, College Park.

=== Entertainers and media personalities ===
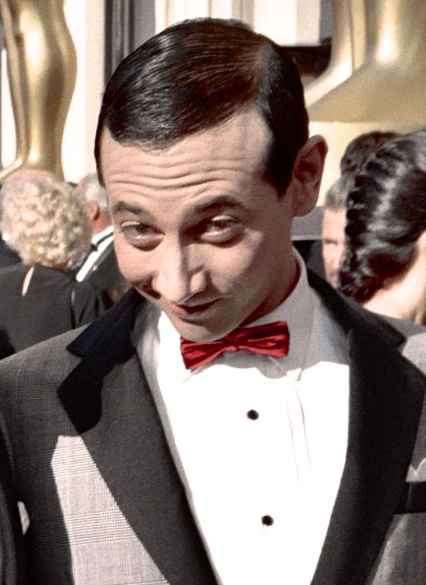
Pee-wee Herman in his signature bow tie

==== Comedians ====
- Fred Allen, American radio and TV comedian
- Charlie Chaplin, renowned comic actor of the silent film era
- Raymond Devos, French humorist
- Fyvush Finkel, comedic actor best known for roles on TV series produced by David E. Kelley, sometimes nicknamed "Bowtie Finkel"
- Pee-wee Herman, played by Paul Reubens
- Marc Evan Jackson, American comedian and actor, who "has played Sparks Nevada, Marshal on Mars wearing a bow tie invariably during every performance" as well as wearing them when he is out of character
- Stan Laurel, comedian, typically wore a bow tie when in character
- Jerry Lewis ("in nutty character")
- Groucho Marx, American comedian
- David Mitchell, actor, comedian, and raconteur of Mitchell and Webb fame. David's bow ties were known as a source of amusement during his early career.
- Garry Moore, comedian who hosted game and variety shows, was known for his crew cut and bow ties
- Frank Muir, British comedy writer and broadcast personality "famous for his pink bow tie and mispronunciation", according to the BBC
- Mo Rocca, identified by the New York Times as one of several comedians who have worn bow ties "ironically"
- Mark Russell, American political comedian, pianist, and parody song author. "Mr. Russell knows from bow ties. They have been his signature for years, along with a star-spangled piano that he plinks every few minutes ..."
- Paul F. Tompkins, American comedian known for his dapper appearance on stage including a penchant for bow ties

==== Journalists and commentators ====
- Tucker Carlson, conservative American commentator In 2005 he told the New York Times he had consistently worn bow ties since childhood, but he acknowledged that bow ties often provoke negative reactions, "like a middle finger protruding from your neck." Following his tenure on CNN's Crossfire (Jon Stewart famously knocked the bow tie during his infamous 2004 appearance on the show), he has switched primarily to long neckties or no ties at all.
- John Daly, journalist and host of What's My Line?, was often photographed in a bow tie; evening dress (which included bow ties) was worn by the host and panelists on that game show
- Sir Robin Day (1923–2000), British television commentator and interviewer; his BBC News obituary said "With his thick horn-rimmed spectacles and trade mark polka-dot bow tie, he was the great inquisitor"
- Troy Dungan, retired chief weather anchor for WFAA-TV (ABC) in Dallas-Fort Worth, owns approximately 220 bow ties
- Dave Garroway (1913–1982), American broadcaster, first host of the Today show
- Tom Keene, host of Bloomberg Surveillance on Bloomberg TV and Bloomberg Radio.
- Roger Kimball (born 1953), no longer a bow-tie wearer, U.S. art critic and social commentator, co-editor and co-publisher of The New Criterion and publisher of Encounter Books
- Irving R. Levine (1922–2009), the first foreign correspondent accredited in the Soviet Union., the former economics reporter for NBC television, known for his "trademark bow tie", appeared for the first time in public wearing a necktie for the Brown University commencement in 1994. "I needed help in tying it," he later said.
- Russell Lynes (1910–1991), American art historian, photographer, author and editor of Harper's Magazine
- Tom Oliphant, writer for the Boston Globe
- Charles Osgood (1933–2024), American broadcast journalist, described as having a "trademark bow tie"
- Gene Shalit (1926–2026), U.S. film critic and regular commentator on the Today show
- Harry Smith (born 1951), TV journalist, wore a "trademark" bow tie during his early career at a Denver station, but stopped wearing them when he joined CBS in 1987, when a network official told him that Charles Osgood was CBS' bow-tie-wearing personality and "We can't have two guys wearing bow ties."
- Jeffrey Tucker, editorial director of the American Institute for Economic Research
- Timothy White (1952–2002), rock journalist and "debonair dandy who "always wore his bow tie in public" and prided himself in his jaunty bow tie and white buckskin shoes.".
- Tim Wonnacott, English antiques expert and television presenter best known for presenting Bargain Hunt.
- George Will (born 1941), American conservative syndicated columnist and regular on the This Week Sunday morning program on ABC television. He sometimes appears with a bow tie, sometimes with a long tie, as can be seen on the covers of his books. In 2005, he told the New York Times that whenever he wore a regular necktie, people commented on the absence of his bow tie.
- Matthew Winkler, editor-in-chef emeritus of Bloomberg News.

==== Other entertainment personalities ====
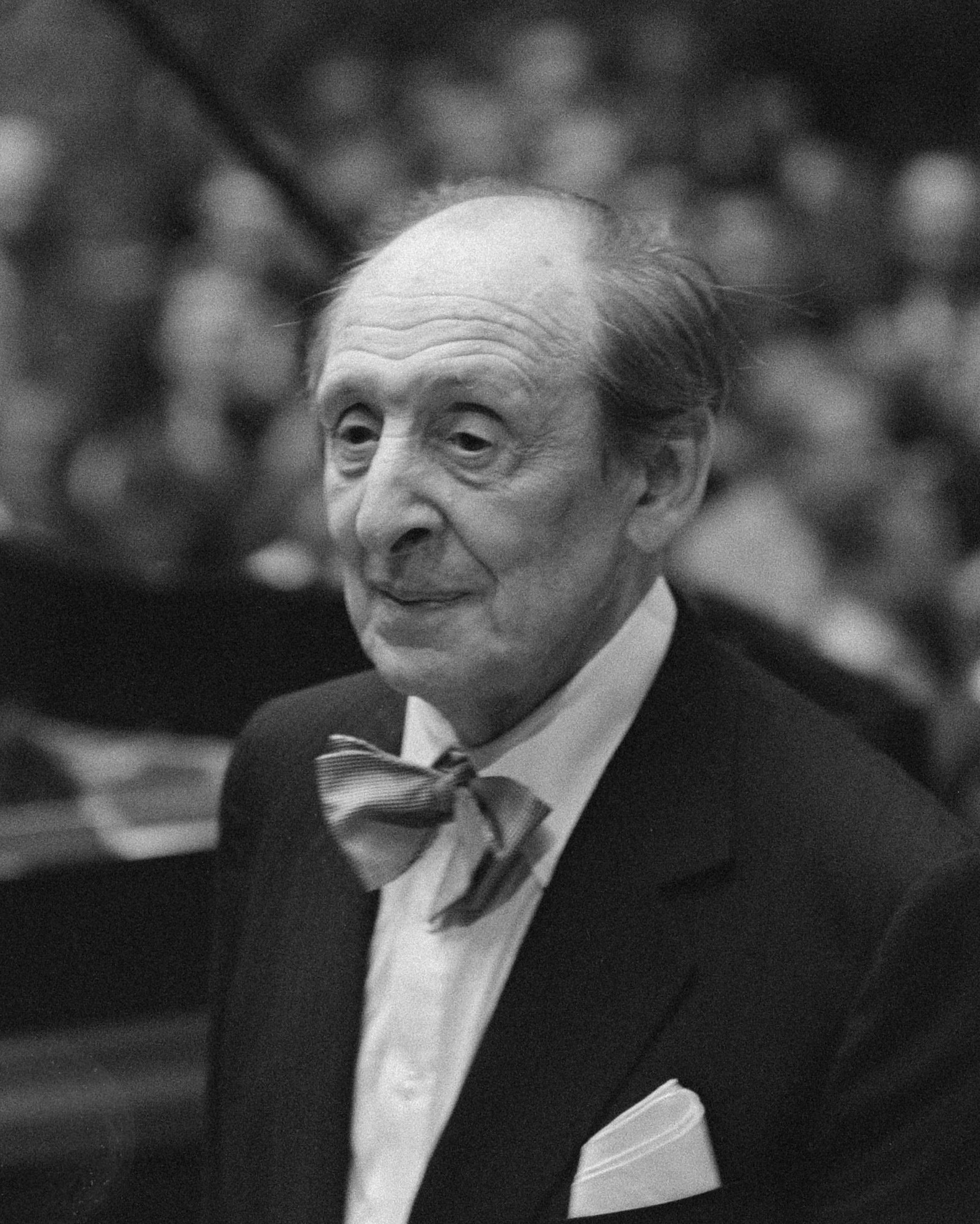
Vladimir Horowitz, pianist

- Fred Astaire
- Frank Sinatra
- JAY-Z
- Raj Bhakta, 2005 contestant on The Apprentice television program, later ran for Congress and lost
- Bud Collyer, American television game show host in the 1950s and early 1960s, typically wore a bow tie
- Keith Floyd, bon viveur, restaurateur and TV chef
- John Houseman (1902–1988), actor
- Vladimir Horowitz (1903–1989), pianist, wore a "trademark bow tie."
- Christopher Kimball, cooking writer and TV host
- Matthew Lesko, American author and late-night television personality whose customary garish outfits include bow ties
- Magician James Randi frequently wore a bow tie in his public appearances.
- Stromae (Paul Van Haver), Belgian singer-songwriter
- Brendon Urie often wore bow ties to correspond with the historic element in Panic! At The Disco's music while the band was active.
- Kevin Gates, American rapper, is frequently seen wearing a black bow tie.
- Kanye West often wore bow ties in the mid-to-late 2000s as part of his Graduation and 808s & Heartbreak-era 'preppy' style.

=== Fashion designers ===
- Manolo Blahnik, shoe designer, sports a "signature bow tie"
- Alber Elbaz (1961–2021), Israeli fashion designer

=== Lawyers ===
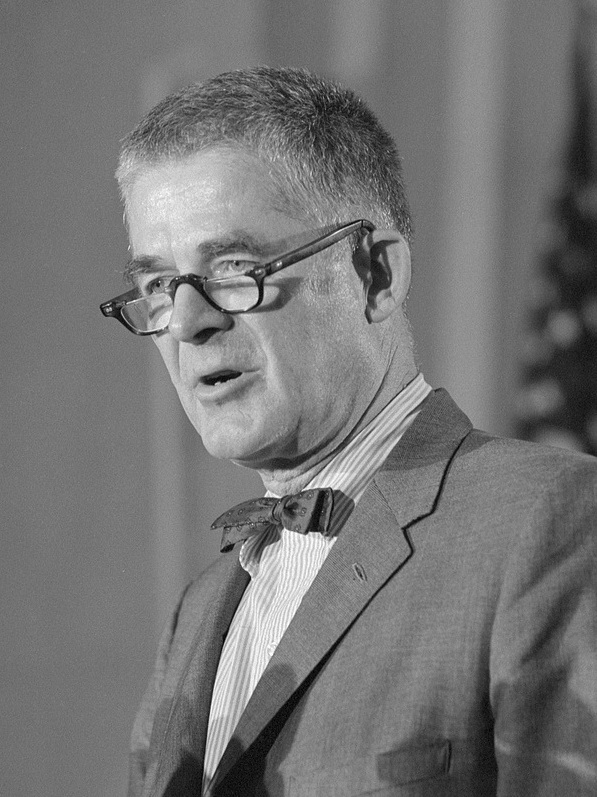
Archibald Cox

- Archibald Cox (1912–2004), the Watergate special prosecutor, constantly wore "his trademark bow tie, neatly knotted as always"
- Edward H. Levi (1911–2000), United States Attorney General, described by The New York Times as looking unready for political combat in "his signature bow tie and thick glasses"
- Louis Lowenstein (1925–2009), professor at Columbia University School of Law
- John Paul Stevens (1920–2019), U.S. Supreme Court Justice who "rarely, if ever, wears any other neckwear on the bench"
- Joseph N. Welch (1890–1960), head attorney for the U.S. Army in the Army–McCarthy hearings of the 1950s

=== Politicians and political activists ===
The regular wearing of bow ties by a politician is often the subject of comment — from friends, foes and journalists:

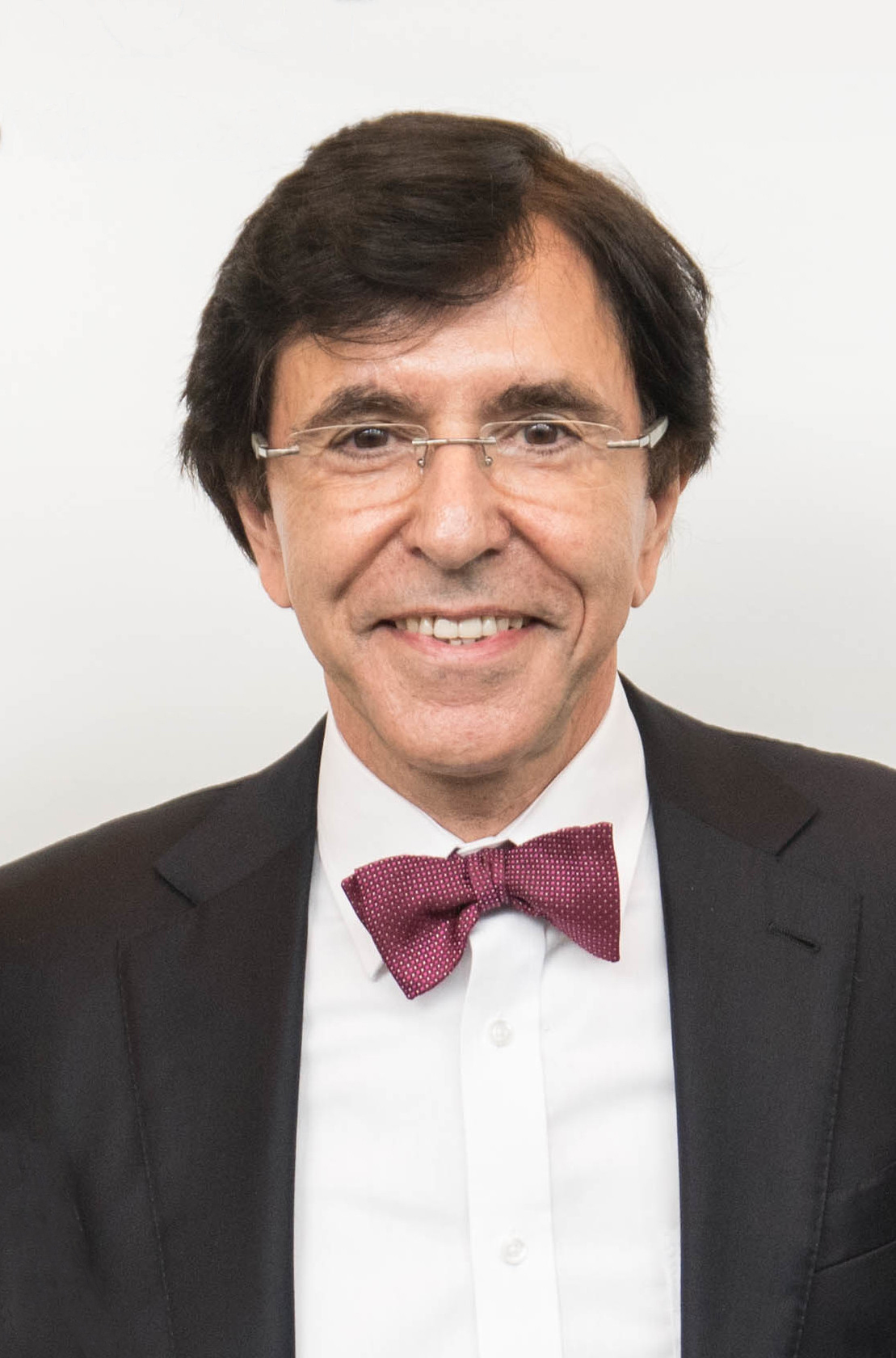
Belgian former prime minister Elio Di Rupo

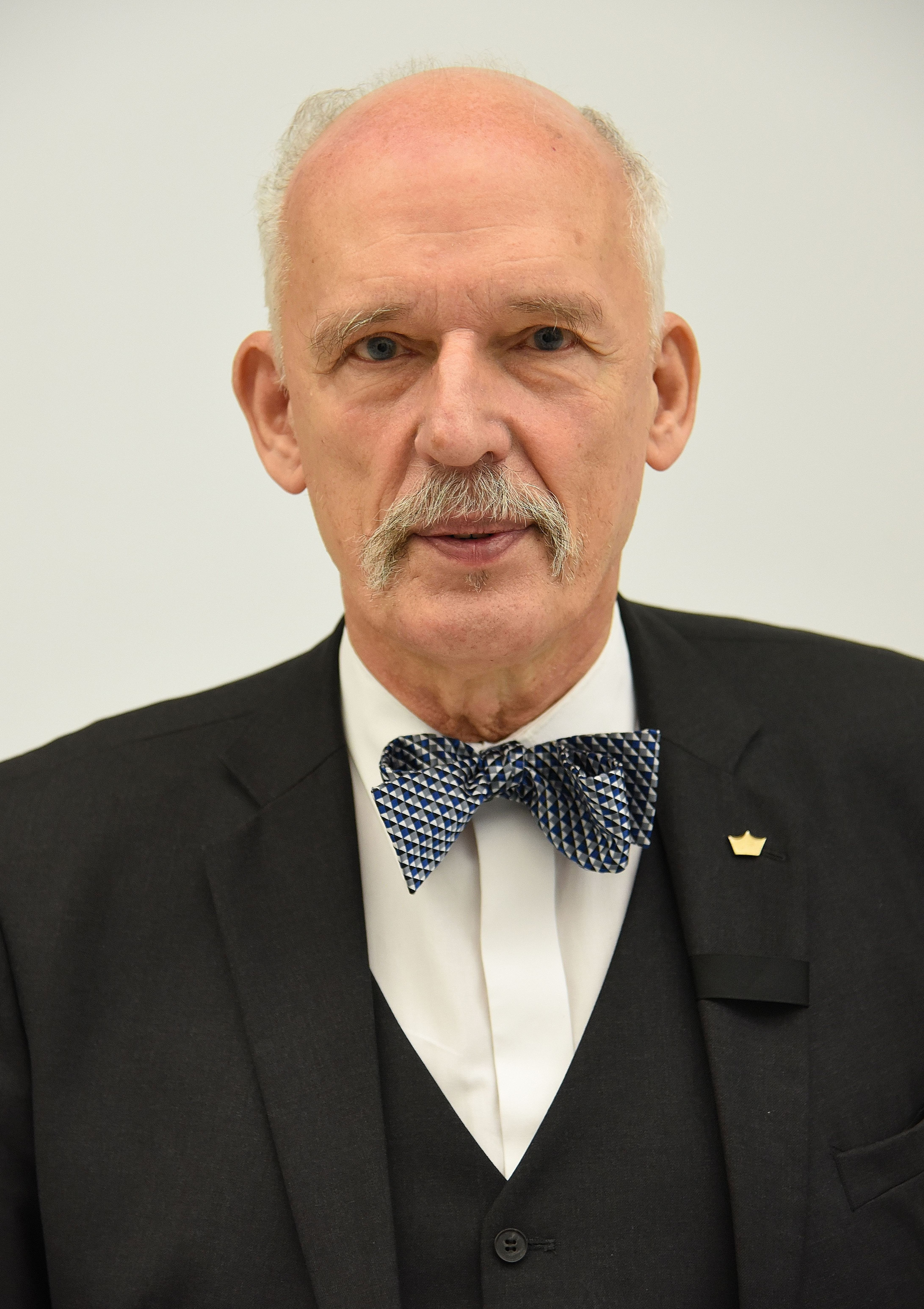
Janusz Korwin-Mikke

- Thomas J. Bliley, Jr., former U.S. Representative from Virginia
- Earl Blumenauer, U.S. Representative from Oregon, wears "his trademark bow tie"
- Winston Churchill, British statesman, prime minister, Nobel Literature Prize laureate
- Tom Connally, U.S. Senator from Texas
- Adolfo Ruiz Cortines, Mexican politician and president.
- Lawrence Coughlin, former U.S. Representative from Pennsylvania
- Mo Cowan, U.S. Senator from Massachusetts
- Elio Di Rupo, former Belgian prime minister, once described by a reporter as "the bow tie wearing Socialist"
- Peter Dunne, former New Zealand politician.
- Abdul Kadir Sheikh Fadzir, Malaysian politician and former Member of Parliament.
- Tom Fink, former Speaker of the Alaska House of Representatives and mayor of Anchorage, Alaska.
- Christian Herter, Governor of Massachusetts, U.S. Secretary of State
- Toomas Hendrik Ilves, president of Estonia, "well-known for always sporting his trademark bow tie"; has even been "dubbed an 'American in a bow tie' by his opponents"

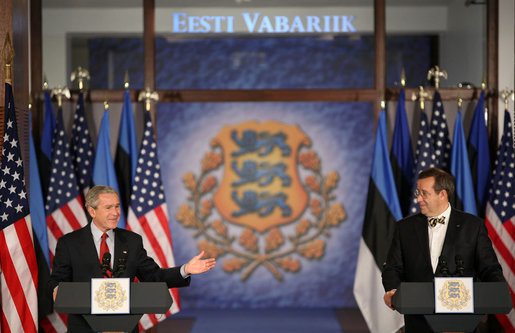
Estonian president Toomas Hendrik Ilves wore a bow tie for this photo with U.S. president George W. Bush

- Stjepan Kljuić, Bosnian politician, former member of tripartite President Council.
- Janusz Korwin-Mikke, Polish liberal conservative publisher and politician
- Patrick McHenry, U.S. representative from North Carolina, acting speaker pro tempore of the House of Representatives
- Farzad Mostashari, the former National Coordinator for Health Information Technology at the U.S. Department of Health and Human Services.
- Daniel Patrick Moynihan, U.S. Senator from New York, whom Hillary Clinton remembered in a speech as having had "three signature items: his horn rimmed glasses, a bow tie, and a great idea"
- Donald Payne Jr., U.S. Representative from New Jersey
- Lester B. Pearson, Canadian prime minister, Nobel Peace Prize laureate, "with his trademark blue polka dot blue" bow tie
- Otis G. Pike, U.S. Representative from New York
- Franklin D. Roosevelt, 32nd President of the United States
- Theodore Roosevelt, 26th President of the United States
- Wolfgang Schüssel, Austrian Chancellor from 2000 to 2007
- Karel Schwarzenberg, Czech politician, foreign minister
- Ardalan Shekarabi, Swedish politician and minister for public administration.
- George P. Shultz, U.S. Secretary of Labor, the Treasury, and State, consistently wore bow ties in the early 1970s
- Paul Simon, U.S. senator from Illinois
- Otto Suhr, Governing Mayor of Berlin (mayor of West Berlin) from 1955 to 1957
- Albert Thomas, former U.S. Representative from Texas
- Donald Tsang, former Chief Executive of Hong Kong — "The bow tie is such an integral part of Tsang's identity that he is nicknamed "bow tie Tsang," according to an Associated Press story
- Julio César Turbay Ayala, president of Colombia from 1978 to 1982
- Daniel Turp, Canadian Parti Québécois politician, formerly known for wearing bow ties.
- Charlie Vanik, Congressman from Ohio, often wore a bow tie through his tenure in the House
- Getúlio Vargas, Brazilian statesman
- Anthony A. Williams, former mayor of Washington, D.C. and nicknamed "Mr. Bow Tie"
- G. Mennen Williams, former governor of the State of Michigan.
- Woodrow Wyatt, a British Labour politician, published author, journalist and broadcaster
- Andrew Muir, member of the Northern Ireland assembly and minister of Agriculture, Environment and Rural Affairs.

=== Psychiatrists and psychologists ===
- Aaron T. Beck, the psychiatrist known as "the father of cognitive therapy" dresses in "his signature bow tie"
- Alfred Kinsey, the influential sex researcher, wore a "trademark bow tie"
- Theodore Millon (1928–2014), psychologist and expert on personality disorders.

=== Athletes ===
- Richard Sherman, Defensive Back of the 2014 Super Bowl Champions Seattle Seahawks is frequently seen wearing a bow tie, and has a YouTube video on how to tie a bow tie.
- Bruce Bowen, longtime National Basketball Association player for the San Antonio Spurs
- Frank Cashen, longtime Major League Baseball executive with the Baltimore Orioles and New York Mets
- Mike Hawthorn, racing driver, co-winner of the 1955 24 Hours of Le Mans, and 1958 Formula One World Driver's Champion
- Dhani Jones, professional football player, has long worn bow ties and has created a line of bow ties for sale
- Tim Lincecum, pitcher for baseball's San Francisco Giants
- Jim Phelan, basketball coach for Mount St. Mary's University. Numerous fans and fellow coaches honored his retirement by wearing bow ties.
- Ken Rosenthal, Lead field reporter for Major League Baseball on Fox is known for wearing a wide variety of bow ties.
- Bill Torrey (1934–2018), General manager who built the New York Islanders into a dynasty that won four consecutive Stanley Cups, known as "Bow-Tie" Bill, after the signature bow tie he always wore.
- Lee Tressel, college football coach at Baldwin–Wallace College and a hall-of-fame member; described as "a cerebral coach who always wore a bow tie and a buzzcut,"

=== Other 20th-/21st-century people associated with wearing bow ties ===
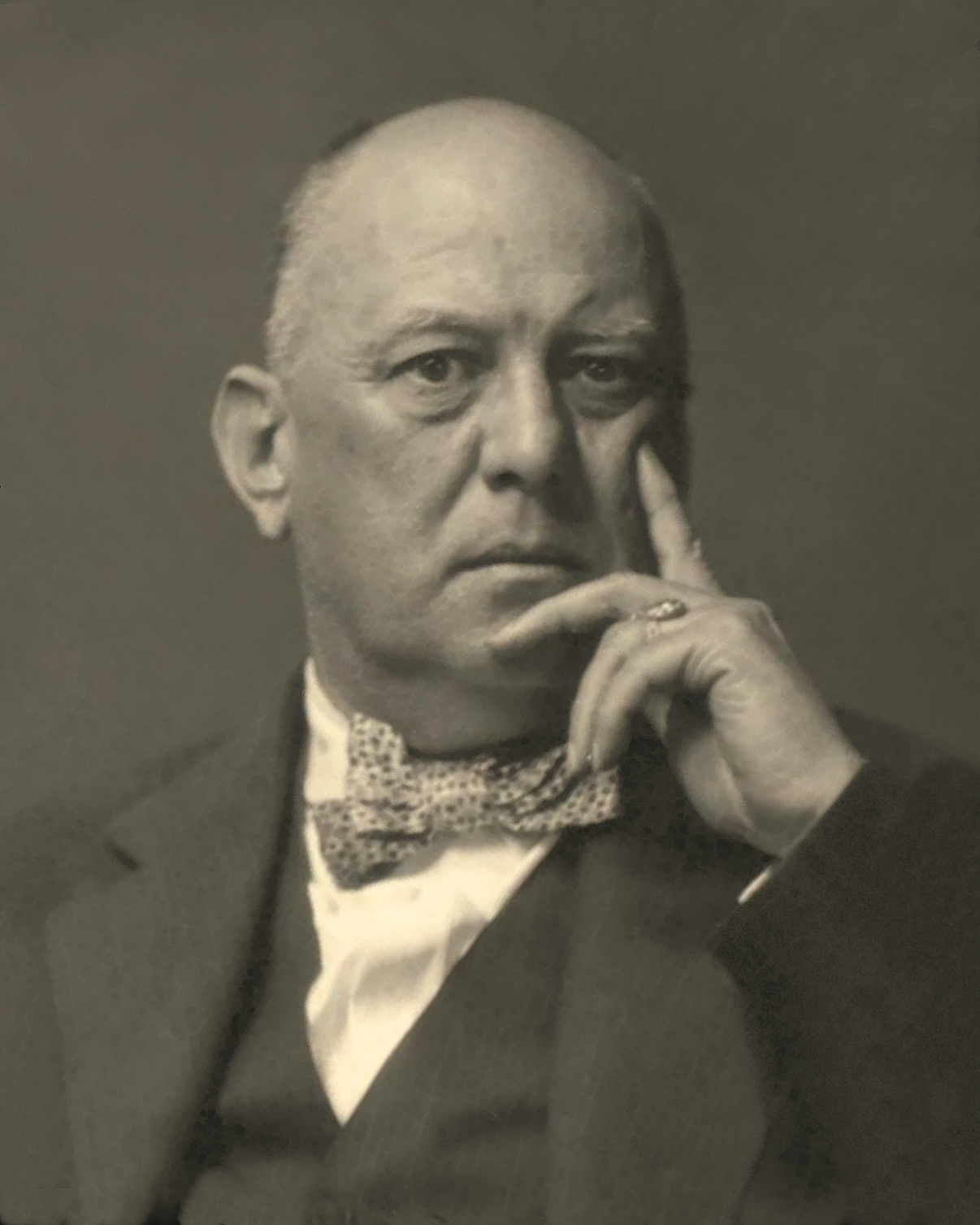
Aleister Crowley, occultist

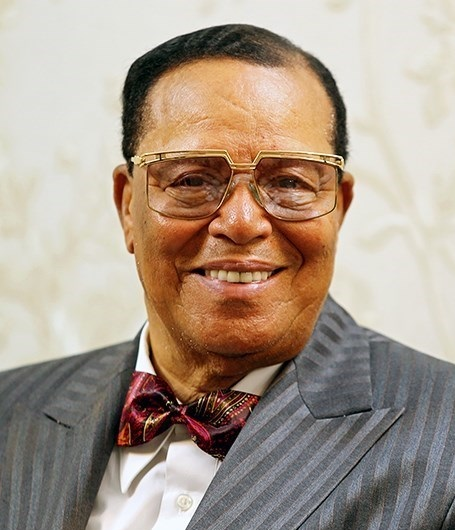
Nation of Islam leader Louis Farrakhan

- Saul Bellow, novelist, often wore a bow tie late in life.
- Finn M. W. Caspersen, financier, philanthropist, often wore bow ties.
- Brian P. Cleary, award-winning author of more than 50 children's books.
- Aleister Crowley, English occultist, often wore extravagant bow ties.
- Robert Denning, interior designer, wore bow ties exclusively the last fourteen years of his life.
- Louis Farrakhan, noted anti-Semite and leader of the Nation of Islam organization
- Ace Greenberg, former CEO and chairman of Bear Stearns
- C. Everett Koop, former U.S. Surgeon General known for his "omnipresent red bow tie"
- Howard Phillips, former spokesman for Nintendo as well as first editor of Nintendo Power magazine from the early 1980s until 1991
- Orville Redenbacher (1907–1995), owner of an American popcorn business who appeared in commercials for it and had his image on the boxes — always wearing horn-rimmed glasses and a bow tie.
- Jim Rogers (born 1942), author
- Albert Schweitzer, German physician, humanitarian, Nobel Peace Prize laureate
- W. Clement Stone (1902–2002), businessman and philanthropist, had a collection of 250 bow ties.
- James Strong, Australian businessman who was CEO of Qantas from 1993 to 2001.
- Colonel Sanders (1890–1980), American businessman who founded KFC
- Diana, Princess of Wales (1961-1997), frequently wore bow ties, reflecting her masculine-influenced style.

== Fictional characters ==
Bow ties are a consistent element in the depiction of some fictional characters.

=== Characters in film and television ===
Film and television characters portrayed by human actors as consistently wearing bow ties have included:

- Blaine Anderson, a character in Glee, can frequently be seen wearing a bow tie.
- Chuck Bass, a character in Gossip Girl known for his dandy sense of style, is often seen sporting a bow tie with a matching pocket square.
- Buckaroo Banzai, titular neurosurgeon, particle physicist, race car driver, rock star and comic book hero from The Adventures of Buckaroo Banzai Across the 8th Dimension, sports a bow tie throughout the film.
- Billy Bunter, a character in the works of Charles Hamilton
- Gil Chesterton, a character on Frasier, was never seen without a bow tie.
- Bertram Cooper, a character in the drama series Mad Men who is never seen without a bow tie.
- The Doctor, central character of Doctor Who, in his second, third and eleventh incarnations; and during his sixth one undercover, and during his tenth and thirteenth ones with their tuxedos. Actor Matt Smith pressed for the bow tie and regularly declared in character that "bow ties are cool".
- Richard Gilmore, the patriarch of the Gilmore family on the TV series Gilmore Girls, played by actor Edward Herrmann, was always seen wearing a bow tie.
- Mr. Hooper, Sesame Street character played by Will Lee
- Indiana Jones of the Indiana Jones franchise is frequently seen wearing a bow tie with his suit.
- Dr. Donald "Ducky" Mallard, M.D., M.E. the Chief Medical Examiner in NCIS is always seen wearing a bow tie of various colors.
- Michael, the "architect" in The Good Place, played by Ted Danson, usually wears a bow tie except when relevant to the story line to have him without one.
- Brother Mouzone, the enforcer who appears in The Wire television series, wears a "trademark suit and bowtie" and glasses, consistent with his image of being "more like a banker or entrepreneur or scholar" than a hitman.
- Les Nessman, character in WKRP in Cincinnati television sitcom
- Hercule Poirot, fictional detective
- Sidney Reilly as played by Sam Neill in the BBC television mini-series Reilly, Ace of Spies.
- Baxter Stockman wears a bow tie in the 1987 Teenage Mutant Ninja Turtles series.
- Uncle Wally, Sesame Street character played by Bill McCutcheon
- Sheldon Cooper, character in Young Sheldon
- Aziraphale, a character in Good Omens, wears his signature bow tie in all his modern day outfits, including in the Final Fifteen scene

=== Characters in comics and cartoons ===
Bow ties are a consistent part of the depiction of many characters created by artists for entertainment media including comics, cartoons, and anime.

Among these are many Hanna-Barbera cartoon characters:

- Boo-Boo Bear
- The mouse Pixie and the cat Mr. Jinks in the cartoon Pixie and Dixie and Mr. Jinks
- Magilla Gorilla
- Huckleberry Hound
- Jerry Mouse in Tom and Jerry (1975–1977)
- Snagglepuss, Hanna-Barbera cartoon character created in 1959, a pink anthropomorphic mountain lion

Other artist-created characters consistently or frequently depicted in bow ties include:

- In spin-off animated film series My Little Pony: Equestria Girls, Twilight Sparkle wears a pink mini bow tie as a human
- Bernard Bernoulli of the Maniac Mansion and Day of the Tentacle computer games
- Rock Bottom from Felix the Cat
- Dagwood Bumstead, character in Blondie comic strip
- Siblings Caliborn and Calliope from Homestuck who used to share a body and thus wear the same bow tie between them
- Bill Cipher from Gravity Falls
- The Cat in the Hat
- Donald Duck, Disney cartoon character
- Count Duckula always wore a red bow tie as part of his ensemble
- Conan Edogawa, alias of character Jimmy Kudo in Detective Conan manga and anime comics
- Harvey, in the play and film of the same name, the invisible, bow-tied, 6-foot rabbit whose portrait was shown in the play and film with him wearing a bow tie
- Carl Fredricksen, the main character in the 2009 Pixar film, Up. Prior to that, he wore neckties from the 1950s through the 1990s
- Hoppity Hooper, cartoon character in the same titled show
- Krusty the Clown, cartoon character in The Simpsons
- Leopold the Cat, the namesake of a Russian cartoon series, wears a bow tie, even when he goes swimming
- Mickey Mouse
- Franklin "Foggy" Nelson. In the Marvel Daredevil comics, Nelson is a lawyer, best friend and longtime business partner of blind lawyer Matthew M. Murdock (a.k.a. the masked vigilante Daredevil). Even though Foggy Nelson occasionally wears standard neckties, he is partial to bow ties
- Jimmy Olsen often was depicted wearing a bow tie in the comic titles Superman and Superman's Pal Jimmy Olsen
- Mister Peabody, a cast member of Rocky and Bullwinkle and the main character of Peabody's Improbable History
- Opus the Penguin, character in Bloom County comic strip
- The Penguin, in the Batman franchise, though some versions of him wear cravats instead such as Batman Returns, Justice League Action, Gotham, and Harley Quinn
- Porky Pig, Looney Tunes cartoon character
- Jack Point, character in Judge Dredd comic books. The bow tie is part of his clown-like clothing
- Professor Porter, the father-in-law for the title character of Tarzan
- Rich Uncle Pennybags, aka Mr. Monopoly, from the board game Monopoly is frequently shown wearing a bow tie
- Waylon Smithers, cartoon character in The Simpsons
- Moe Szyslak, cartoon character in The Simpsons
- Zatanna, the virtuous sorceress from the DC Universe

== See also ==
- List of barefooters
