= Watershed mine =

Tungsten mine in Queensland, Australia

- Location: 35 km northwest of Mount Carbine, Queensland, Australia
- Products: Tungsten
- Company: Vital Metals

The Watershed mine is a large open pit mine located about 160 km northwest of Cairns on Cape York Peninsula in Far North Queensland, Australia. Watershed represents one of the largest tungsten reserves in Australia having estimated reserves of 15.1 million tonnes of ore grading 0.46% tungsten.

The mine is owned by Vital Metals who acquired the project in 2005. Watershed was Vital Metals flagship project. At time of its acquisition, the site had yet to complete is pre-feasibility study. Development of the site has proceeded with the assistance of the Japan Oil, Gas and Metals National Corporation.

In September 2013, the mine was eventually granted permission to proceed from the Queensland Department of Environment and Heritage Protection.

Access to the mine is via a track leading off the Peninsula Developmental Road. Or from the mine will be trucked to Brisbane and exported to Japan, the US and Korea.

In May 2018, Vital announced the sale of Watershed to Tungsten Mining NL for $15 million cash.

== Geology ==
The deposit is located amongst metamorphosed sediments of the Hodgkinson Formation. Tungsten is found along a 3,000 m stretch of scheelite.

== See also ==
- List of mines in Australia
- Mining in Australia
