= Watershed district =

Watershed district may refer to:

- Watershed district (Minnesota)
- Watershed district (Russia)
