= Watershed Distillery =

Coordinates: 39°59′31.5″N 83°02′13.0″W

- Type: Private
- Industry: Manufacturing of Distilled Spirits
- Founded: 2010
- Founder: Greg Lehman and Dave Rigo
- Headquarters: Columbus, Ohio, U.S.
- Products: Distilled spirits
- Website: watersheddistillery.com

Watershed Distillery is a microdistillery in Columbus, Ohio, United States, founded in 2010 by business partners Greg Lehman and Dave Rigo. The distillery was the second distillery opened in Central Ohio after prohibition, and Watershed brought to market the first legally distilled bourbon whiskey in Central Ohio post-prohibition in 2012. The distillery offers tours to the public and was the first distillery in Ohio to open a restaurant on-site in February 2017, following the passage of Ohio House Bill 351 in 2016. The distillery offers six spirits: vodka, two types of American style gin, bourbon, nocino and a bottled Old Fashioned cocktail.

== History ==
Business partners, Greg Lehman and Dave Rigo, began working on plans for Watershed Distillery in 2008. Seeing parallels between the microdistilling industry and the booming craft beer industry, Lehman and Rigo set out to start the first distillery in Central Ohio post-prohibition.

On September 1, 2010, Watershed received its official Distilled Spirits Plant license (DSP) from the TTB and picked up the keys to the space on the same morning. The duo began work on the first two spirits they were bringing to market, Watershed Vodka and Watershed Gin, and sold their first bottles to the state of Ohio in December 2010. Due to Ohio being an alcoholic beverage control state, Watershed Distillery was now permitted through an A3 permit to sell bottles through the three tier state system, but they were not permitted to sell bottles on site at their distillery. In Ohio, from 2008 through the end of 2011, only one distillery in each of the three most populous counties (Hamilton, Franklin and Cuyahoga) could hold an A3-a permit. This permit allows microdistilleries to sell their products in an A3-a permitted shop on-site. Middle West Spirits, another microdistillery in Columbus, had applied for and obtained the permit for Franklin County a few months prior to Watershed.

In an effort to create change for the industry in Ohio as a whole, Greg Lehman of Watershed Distillery, Ryan Lang of Middle West Spirits and Tom Herbruck of Tom's Foolery Distillery (Cleveland, Ohio), founded the Ohio Distiller's Guild to provide a legislative voice for the state's craft distillers as well as a professional organization that would allow for easier access and sharing of resources and information. Through the guild, legislation was passed in December 2011 that freed up all micro distillers in the state of Ohio producing less than 10,000 proof gallons of high proof spirits annually to qualify for an A3-a permit which allowed them to not only sell bottles on site but also to offer samplings.

In October 2015, Watershed announced its plan to quadruple production capacity by adding a new American built still from Headframe Spirits in Butte, Montana. The new still was installed in June 2016. This announcement came in the midst of efforts by the Ohio Distillers' Guild to once again influence liquor legislation in the state. At the time, both Watershed Distillery and Middle West Spirits, were at risk of losing their A3-a license and the ability to sell bottles on site because they had experienced growth and were approaching the 10,000 proof gallon annual production limit imposed on their businesses by the 2011 legislative decision. Through the efforts of the guild, House Bill 351 was pushed through both the Ohio House and Senate with few objections and was signed into law on June 28, 2016. House Bill 351 also allows Ohio distilleries to open a bar/restaurant by permitting them to apply for an A1A license.

== Spirits ==
=== Vodka ===
Vodka from Watershed Distillery was first sold in 2010 and at the time was made from Ohio corn sourced from local farms. The recipe has since changed and the distillers now create their vodka by blending a distillate they make from fresh pressed Ohio apple cider with their original corn distillate. Vodka from Watershed Distillery is bottled at 80 proof.

=== Four Peel Gin ===
Four Peel Gin, formerly Watershed Gin, is the distillery's signature gin. The name was changed late in 2011 discovering another small distiller had a "Watershed Gin" in their portfolio. Four Peel Gin is an American style gin that is known for its citrus-forward flavor. It is made of eight botanicals including orange peel, lemon peel, lime peel, grapefruit peel, coriander, allspice, cinnamon and Juniper berry. Four Peel Gin from Watershed Distillery is bottled at 88 proof.

=== Bourbon Barrel Gin ===
Bourbon Barrel Gin from Watershed Distillery is a barrel-aged gin the distillery created by aging their Four Peel Gin in spent bourbon barrel for a full year. They released their first batch of this brown gin in 2012 and it has since become one of their most popular products. Bourbon Barrel Gin from Watershed Distillery is bottled at 88 proof.

=== Bourbon ===
Bourbon from Watershed Distillery was first released in 2012 and was two years aged at the time. Current Watershed Bourbon available on shelves is three years aged and the distillery's goal is to eventually have a six-year aged bourbon. They utilize a five grain mash bill (corn, wheat, barley, rye and spelt) and age their bourbon in 53-gallon, char 4 barrels. Watershed Bourbon is bottled at 94 proof.

=== Nocino ===
Nocino from Watershed Distillery was first launched in late 2014. The distillers learned how to make Nocino from a local physician who wanted to see Nocino produced commercially in the United States. Watershed's Nocino is a 48 proof, black walnut liqueur made from Ohio grown and harvested black walnuts, Watershed Vodka, vanilla bean, orange peel, cloves, cinnamon and sugar.

=== Bottled Old Fashioned ===
Watershed Distillery launched a pre-bottled Old Fashioned cocktail in November 2014. Craft cocktails tend to be a growing trend in the industry that distillers are pursuing. Watershed's Old Fashioned is a blend of bourbon, orange and aromatic bitters, raw sugar and Ohio cherry juice blended and bottled at 70 proof.

== Watershed Kitchen & Bar ==
In late November 2016, Watershed Distillery announced plans to open Watershed Kitchen & Bar. Watershed became the first distillery in Ohio to open a restaurant under the new law that allows distilleries to apply for the A1A or "brewpup" license in Ohio. The Executive Chef for the restaurant is Chef Jack Moore, formerly of Jonathon Sawyer's The Greenhouse Tavern, and the bar program was run by Alex Chien.
