= Alberta Premium =

100% rye grain rye whisky produced in North America

- Type: Rye whisky
- Manufacturer: Suntory Global Spirits
- Origin: Canada
- Website: albertadistillers.com

Alberta Premium (produced by Alberta Distillers Ltd, of Calgary, Alberta, Canada) is one of the few remaining 100% rye grain rye whiskies produced in North America. The brand is owned by Suntory Global Spirits, a subsidiary of Suntory Holdings of Osaka, Japan.

Alberta Premium won "Canadian Whisky of the Year" in Jim Murray's 2006, 2007, 2008, 2009 and 2021 Whisky Bibles.

Introduced in 1958, Alberta Premium was originally only available in Canada, until its launch of their cask strength rye whiskey. Later they decided to introduce the original to the United States as well.

== Production process ==
The process uses 100% Canadian Prairie rye grain that is unmalted. The rye grain is ground to a fine flour by a hammer mill at the distillery. This meal is added to water, the mash is exposed to a proprietary enzyme, cooked, and fermented. The resulting liquid is distilled using two different distillation types - continuous distillation and the pot still. The liquid is aged in three different barrel sources: ex-bourbon barrels, once-used bourbon barrels, and the new white oak charred barrels. It is then blended to create the final liquor. The blended rye whiskey is believed to be five years old; the age is not stated on the bottle label.

== Company history ==
Alberta Distillers Limited was started in 1946 by Canadian oilman Frank McMahon and Canadian newspaper publisher Max Bell, built on 23 acres of land on what was then the outskirts of Calgary, Alberta. George Conrad Reifel, a Canadian brewer and distiller who had worked in Japan to establish the Anglo Japanese Brewing Company, joined the company to assist with the complex process of distilling rye. By 1957, the distillery expanded to have three heat-controlled warehouses and contained upwards of 100,000 barrels of aging whiskies on over 28 acres of land. In 1967, National Distillers & Chemical Corporation purchased Alberta Distillers to expand their own liquor portfolio. Alberta Distillers was sold off after Standard & Poor gave a negative outlook for whiskey. By 1975, the plant site grew to 42 acres in Calgary. The final warehouse construction gave the distillery storage for over 600,000 barrels. The site is one of the few in Canada that can age barrels in both rack and pallet style warehouses. With two rail spurs onsite, the distillery can ship and receive by rail, ISO tankers, and tanker trailers. In 1986, Alberta Distillers was purchased by American Brands, which itself was renamed as Fortune Brands in 1997 and split apart in 2011 into Fortune Brands Home & Security and Beam Inc. Beam Inc. was then purchased by the Suntory multinational holding company of Japan.

== See also ==
- Other 100% rye whiskies:
  - Century Distilling's Century Reserve 13 Year Old
  - Anchor Brewing Old Potrero
  - Woody Creek Distillers Colorado Straight Rye Whiskey
  - Goodridge & Williams Independent Craft Distillers has a 100% rye currently in the process of aging
  - Canadian Club Chairman's Select 100% Rye
