= Rye whiskey =

Distilled alcoholic beverage

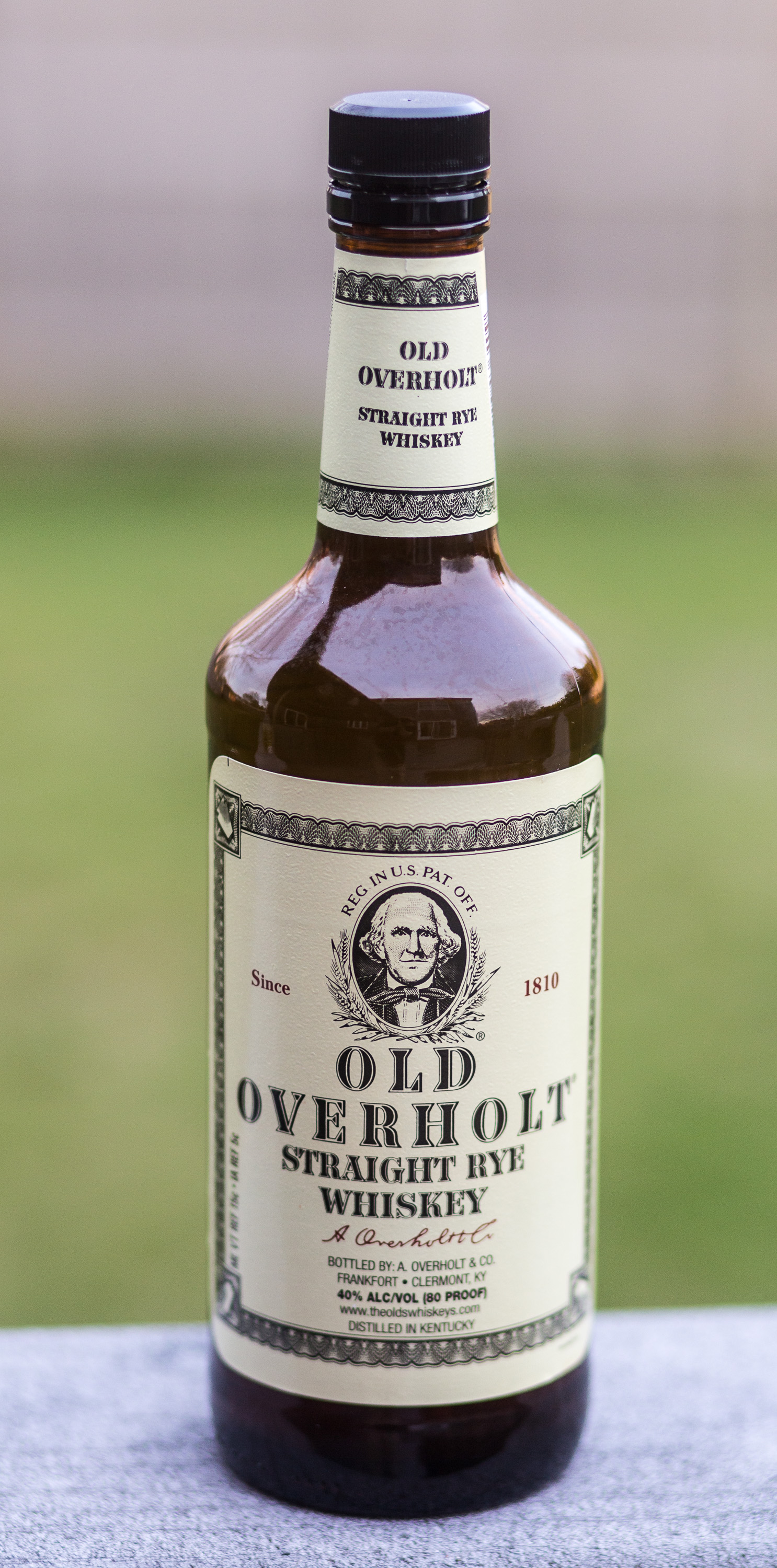
A bottle of American straight rye whiskey

Rye whiskey can refer to two different, but related, types of whiskey:

- American rye whiskey, which is similar to bourbon whiskey, but must by law be distilled from at least 51 percent pure rye grain
- Canadian whisky, which is often referred to as (and often labeled as) rye whisky for historical reasons, although it does not necessarily include any rye grain.

== American rye whiskey ==
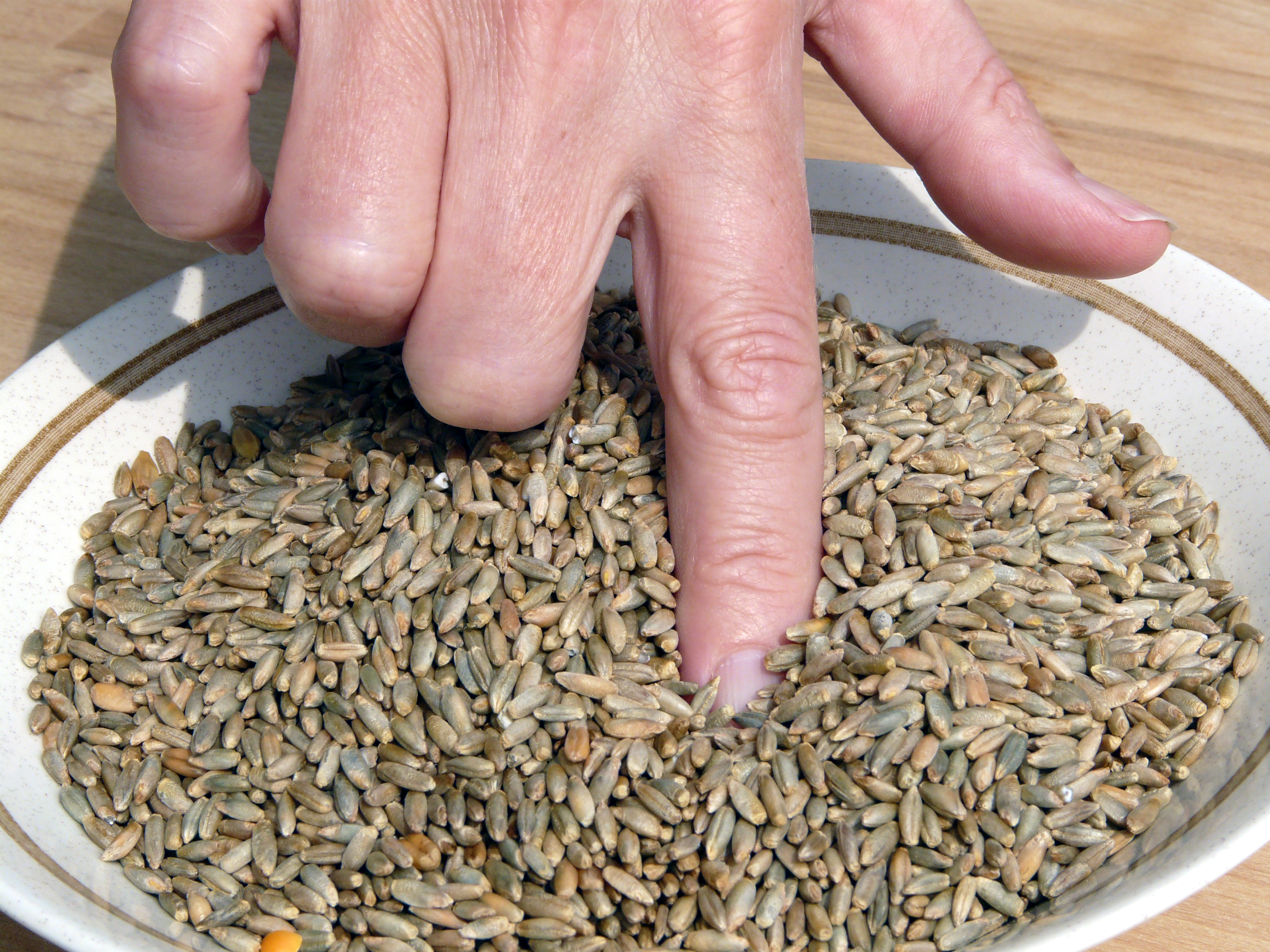
Rye grain, by law, must make up at least 51% of the mash bill of a rye whiskey in the United States.

In the United States, rye whiskey is, by law, made from a mash of at least 51 percent rye. (The other ingredients in the mash are usually corn and malted barley.) However, rye whiskey can be made from 100 percent rye in some cases. It is distilled to no more than 160 U.S. proof (80% abv) and aged in charred, new oak barrels. The whiskey must be put in the barrels at no more than 125 proof (62.5% abv). Rye whiskey that has been aged for at least two years and has not been blended with other spirits may be further designated as straight, as in "straight rye whiskey".

=== History ===
As a grain, rye originated in the Euphrates valley (present-day Syria and Iraq) about 10,000 years ago. It gradually migrated into Poland, Germany and the Baltic region, where it was used to make bread, beer, vodka and korn. During the 17th and 18th centuries, it made its way across the Atlantic to the New World via early Dutch and German settlers, and English settlers later favored the grain for its versatility and vigor.

Rye whisky was historically prevalent in the northeastern states, especially Pennsylvania, New York, and Maryland, because of their acidic soils and cold climate. Pittsburgh was the center of rye whiskey production in the late 1700s and early 1800s. By 1808, Allegheny County, Pennsylvania farmers were selling half a barrel for each man, woman and child in the country. By the 1880s, Joseph F. Sinnott's distillery, Moore and Sinnott, located in Monongahela, Pennsylvania, was the largest producer of rye whiskey, with a capacity of 30,000 barrels a year. In 1886, rye whiskey was produced in 17 states.

Rye whiskey largely disappeared after Prohibition and struggled to reemerge afterward because production costs were high. A few brands, such as Old Overholt, survived, although by the late 1960s former Pennsylvania brands like Old Overholt were being distilled mostly in Kentucky.

In the early 21st century, an expanding number of rye whiskey brands are produced by Campari Group (Wild Turkey Rye), Diageo (George Dickel Rye and Bulleit Rye), Heaven Hill (Pikesville Rye and Rittenhouse Rye), Suntory Global Spirits (Old Overholt and Jim Beam Rye), The Sazerac Company (Col. E. H. Taylor, Sazerac Rye, and Thomas H. Handy), and various smaller companies. A particularly large producer is MGP of Indiana (formerly known as Lawrenceburg Distillers Indiana), which distills for many brands marketed by others (including some of the large companies previously listed).

Rye whiskey has been undergoing a small but growing revival in the US. Since the beginning of the 21st century, more producers have been experimenting with rye whiskey, and several now market aged rye whiskey. For example, Brown-Forman began production of a Jack Daniel's rye whiskey and released unaged and lightly aged versions as limited editions. A reconstructed distillery at Mount Vernon (the estate of George Washington) sells a rye that is similar to the whiskey Washington made. At its peak, Washington's original distillery was among the largest producers of rye whiskey in the United States, averaging 11,000 US gallons (42,000 L; 9,200 imp gal) per year. In 2023, Maryland passed legislation naming Maryland rye whiskey as the state's official liquor. In 2026, legislation has been introduced in Pennsylvania to make rye whiskey the official spirit of Pennsylvania.

=== Differences between rye and bourbon ===
Rye grain is known for imparting what many call a spicy or fruity flavor to the whiskey. Bourbon, distilled from at least 51% corn, is noticeably sweeter and tends to be more full-bodied than rye. As bourbon gained popularity beyond the southern United States, bartenders increasingly substituted it for rye in cocktails such as the whiskey sour, Manhattan, and Old Fashioned, which were originally made with rye. All other things being equal, the character of the cocktail will be drier (i.e., less sweet) with rye.

=== Styles ===
American straight rye whiskey has historically been subdivided into regional styles, which differ in the rye content of the mash and subsequent flavor profiles. Typically, the more rye in the mash bill, the spicier the whiskey should be, aging notwithstanding.

Pennsylvania-style, also called Monongahela rye or “Old Monongahela”, conversely, was traditionally made with a very high percentage of rye in its mash bill, upwards of 95%, and is generally spicier. This style is also characterized by a mix of malted and unmalted rye in the mash bill. Traditionally speaking, it contained no unmalted barley, was fermented as a sweet mash, distilled in a three-chamber still, and, lastly, aged in heated warehouses. Historically, it was made exclusively in Pennsylvania and was fairly well-documented.

Maryland-style historically contained 65-70% rye and 30-35% corn in the mash bill, and generally had a sweeter flavor. At times, fruit juice was added for extra sweetness. This style was also made all across the Eastern Seaboard. This style was also said to be more of a mystery because, while at one point it was one of the most widely consumed types of whiskey in America, what defined it was nearly lost. In turn, distillers sometimes have to reverse engineer this style from the terms and verbiage used to promote it. While Pennsylvania rye was defined prescriptively (by its recipe and production methods), Maryland rye seems to have been defined descriptively (by its resulting flavor profile).

Kentucky-style is characterized by an even sweeter profile than Maryland-style, as its mash bill is normally 51-55% rye, only slightly above the minimum required for a straight rye, with the remaining grains being a mix of corn and malted barley. Because of its relatively low rye content, it is comparable to high-rye bourbons.

With the decline of straight rye whiskey after Prohibition and the subsequent closure of large distilleries in Maryland and Pennsylvania, the historic distinctions were mostly lost, though the 21st-century revival of American straight rye has led modern producers to describe their products in terms of these historic styles.

== Canadian rye whisky ==
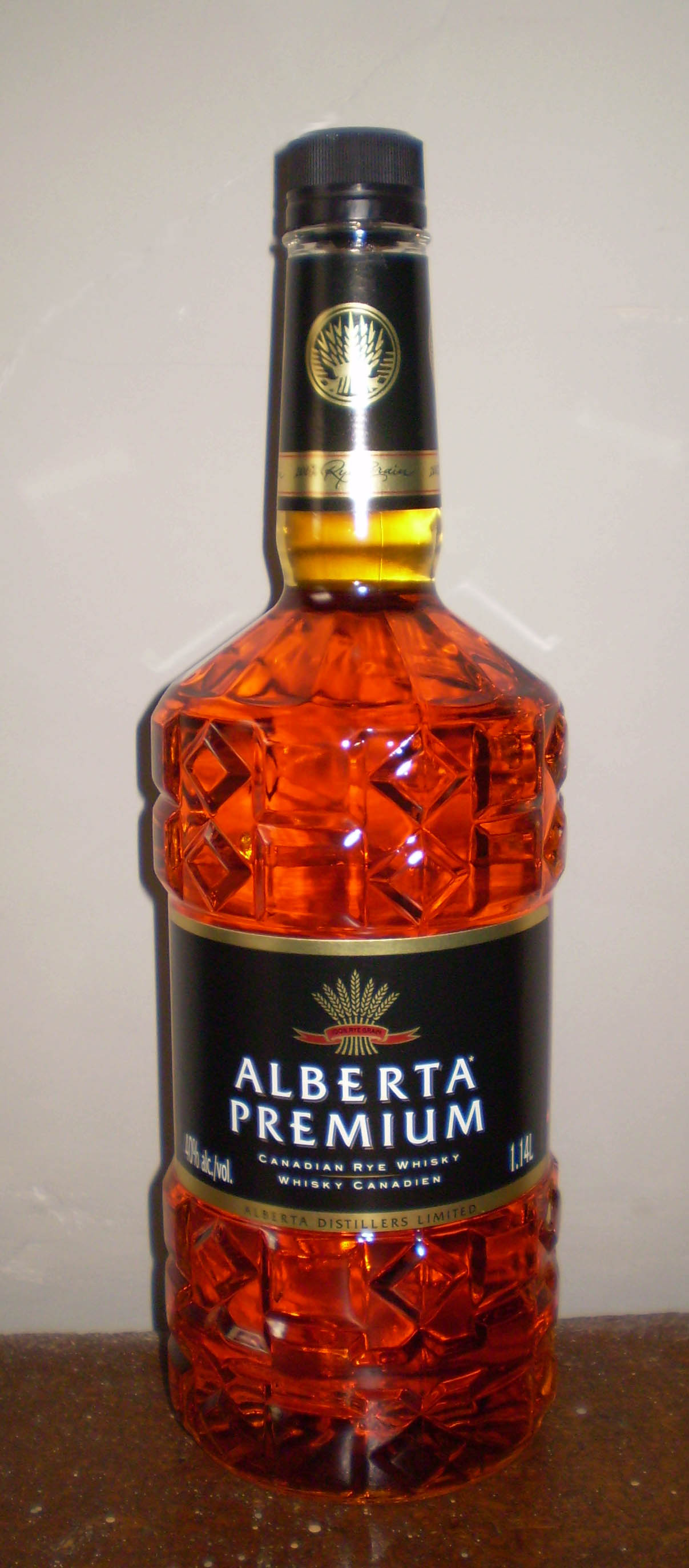
Alberta Premium Canadian Rye Whisky

Canadian whisky is often referred to as "rye whisky" because, historically, much of the content was rye. There is no requirement for rye to be used to make Canadian whisky, and the labels "Canadian whisky", "Canadian rye whisky" and "Rye whisky" are all legally permitted, regardless of the actual composition, provided the whiskies "possess the aroma, taste and character generally attributed to Canadian whisky".

In modern practice, most Canadian whiskies are blended to achieve this character, primarily consisting of a high-proof base whisky typically made from corn or wheat and aged in used barrels, combined with a small amount of flavoring whisky made from a rye mash and distilled to a lower proof. In some cases, the corn-to-rye ratio may be as high as 9:1. There are a few exceptions, such as Alberta Premium and Canadian Club Chairman's Select, which are made from 100% rye mash.

Canadian whisky must be aged in wooden barrels no larger than 700 litres (154 imp gal; 185 US gal) for at least three years, and the barrels do not have to be new oak or charred. This requirement differs from regulations for U.S. blended whiskey, in which the bulk base spirits are not required to be aged.

== Rye elsewhere ==
Scotch whisky distillers were using rye as a mash ingredient for grain whisky in the 18th century. By the 2020s, tariffs on biogas producers had increased the availability of the grain, leading modern distilleries to begin experimenting with the new raw material. At the 2026 London Spirits Competition, an Australian malted rye whiskey from Archie Rose Distilling Co. was named the rye whiskey of the year. Rye whiskeys are uncommon from Australian distillers as much of the country is unsuitable for growing the grain.

Whiskies distilled from rye are made in several European countries, but a trade treaty between the European Union and Canada restricts use of the term "rye whisky" in the EU to spirits made in Canada and the United States.

== See also ==
- List of whisky brands
- Outline of whisky
- Starka
