= List of distilleries in Canada =

This is an incomplete list of various alcoholic distilled beverages (spirits) such as whisky, rum, vodka, brandy, gin, etc. distilleries in Canada.

== History ==
Canada's first recorded distillery was established in Quebec City in 1769. By the 1840s over 200 distilling licences had been registered in the country, and Canada was gaining recognition as a producer of high quality whisky.

== Operating distilleries ==
Distillery	Community	Province	Products	Ownership	Brands
Micro-distilleries or craft distillers
Bridgeland Distillery	Calgary	AB	Brandy, whisky, grappa	Bridgeland Distillery Inc	Bridgeland Moscato Brandy, Bridgeland Gewürztraminer Brandy, Bridgeland Limoncello, Bridgeland Single Malt Spirit, Bridgeland Corn Spirit, Bridgeland Old Fashioned Cocktail, Bridgeland Eau De Vigne Grappolo from Gewürztraminer, Bridgeland Spolumbo's Amaro
Ciderie Michel Jodoin	Rougemont	QC	Apple eau de vie, brandy, liqueurs	Michel Jodoin	Fine Caroline, Fine Caroline Rosée, Ambre de pomme, Calijo, XO – 8 ans d’âge, Pom de vie
Confluence Distilling	Calgary	AB	Vodka, gin, akvavit, amari	Confluence Distilling	Manchester Dry Gin, Headwater Aquavit, Vinland Aquavit
Copper Cork Distillery	Vermilion	AB	Vodka, gin, flavoured spirits	Copper Cork Distillery Ltd.	V-Town Vodka, Simply Gin, Rhuby Gin, Spiced Pear Gin, Vi's Raspberry Spirit, Blueberry Spirit, Saskatoon Berry Spirit, Sweet Almond Spirit, Christmas Spirit
Deep Blue Distilleries	Richmond	BC	Vodka, gin, flavoured spirits, grain spirit	Deep Blue Distilleries	Charm Vodka Nookum Gin Proof Beyond Bang On Flash Bang Sour Goose Fighter Vodka Pirate Pete’s Vendetta
Dillon's Small Batch Distillers	Beamsville	ON	White rye whiskey, vodka, gin, absinthe, eau de vie, liqueurs	Dillon's Distillers	Unfiltered Gin 22, Method 95 Vodka, The White Rye, Rose Gin, Cherry Gin, Strawberry Gin, Absinthe, Limoncello, Orangecello, Pear Eau-de-Vie, Black Walnut Amaro, flavoured cocktail bitters, Lab Series
Distillerie Fils du Roy	Petit-Paquetville	NB	Vodka, aged vodka, gin, grain spirit, molasses brandy, blueberry liquor, cranberry liquor, pastis, absinthe, single malt whisky	Distillerie Fils du Roy	Grande Bagosse, Vieille Bagosse, Gin Thuya, L'eau d'août, Fort La Tour, Le Souverain Bleu, Le Monarque Rouge, Therio, Courailleuse
Eau Claire Distillery	Turner Valley	AB	Vodka, gin	Eau Claire Distillery	Three Point Vodka, Parlour Gin, Equinox Gin
Forty Creek Distillery	Grimsby	ON	Whisky	Forty Creek Distillery	Barrel Select, Copper Pot Reserve, Whisky Cream Liquor, Double Barrel Reserve, Confederation Oak Reserve, Evolution, Port Wood Reserve, John's Private Cask No. 1, Small Batch Reserve, Heart of Gold.
Glenora Distillers	Glenville	NS	Whisky	Glenora Distillers	Glen Breton Rare 10, Glen Breton Rare ICE (10, 15, 17), Glen Breton Rare 8 & 14, The Battle of the Glen
Goodridge & Williams Independent Craft Distillers	Delta	BC	Vodka, gin, apéritif, coolers, whisky	Goodridge & Williams Independent Craft Distillers	Nütrl Vodka, Sid's Handcrafted Vodka, Tempo Gin, Sid's Something Else
Ironworks Distillery	Lunenburg	NS	Rum, vodka, apple brandy, eau de vie, blueberry liqueur, cranberry liqueur	Ironworks Distillery	
Jones Distilling	Revelstoke	BC	Vodka, gin, alcoholic botanical cordial	Jones Distilling Ltd.	Mr. Jones Vodka, Revelstoke Premium Gin Series (Gin No. 1), Revelstoke Collection (Go Big or Go Gnome, Sweet Spot)
Junction 56 Distillery	Stratford	ON	Gin, vodka, whiskies, moonshine	Junction 56 Distillery	
King's Lock Craft Distillery	Johnstown	ON	Rum, rye, vodka, gin	King's Lock Craft Distillery Inc.	Rum, Rye, Vodka, Aged Gin, Gin
Kinsip House of Fine Spirits	Bloomfield	ON	Vodka, gin, rum, whisky, brandy, crème de cassis, saffron liqueur	Kinsip House of Fine Spirits	Still's Whisper (Whole Wheat) Vodka, Woodlands Whisper (Pine) Vodka, Juniper's Wit Gin, Juniper's Wit Gin Barred Aged Version, Dark Waters Rum, Coopers Revival Rye Whisky, County Cassis (Creme de Cassis), Whisky Barrel Aged Maple Syrup, Saffron Liqueur
Krang Spirits Inc	Cochrane	AB	Vodka – plain & flavoured, krupnik, apple brandy, fruit liqueurs, white spirits	Krang Spirits Inc	Astra Clara Vodka, Nimbulus Gin, Bad Billy, Krang Krupnik, Persephone, Raspberry, Sour Cherry and Black Currant Krang, Apple Brandy
Last Best Brewing & Distilling	Calgary	AB	Vodka, gin, whisky	Bear Hill Brewing Company	Last Best Jelly Gin, Last Best White Label Series
Last Mountain Distillery	Lusmden	SK	Baldur's whisky, Vodka, Gin, Rum, Liqueurs,, Premixed Cocktail	Last Mountain Distillery	Last Mountain Distillery Vodka, Dill Pickle Vodka, Baldur's Whisky, Lokel Vodka, Granny's Gin
Last Straw Distillery	Vaughan	ON	Aged moonshine, gin, blackstrap spirit	Last Straw Distillery Corp.	Dark Side of the Moonshine, Gin Twenty-One, Blackstrap
LB Distillers	Saskatoon	SK	Single malt whisky, Vodka, Gin, Rum, Fruit Liqueurs, Eaux de Vie, Cocktail Bitters	Skatchwyn Distilling Company	Lucky Bastard Vodka, Gambit Gin, Knock on Wood Rum, Naked Single Malt, Bettah Bitters
Limited Distilling	Niagara-on-the-Lake	ON	Gin, vodka, jalapeño and various flavoured moonshines, white rye	Limited Distilling Corp.	Limited Gin, Limited Vodka, Limited Jalapeño Moonshine, Limited White Rye, Limited Corn Moonshine, Limited Elderberry Lavender Vodka, Limited Rose Vodka, Limited Apple Pie Moonshine, Limited Peach Moonshine, Limited Mint Elixir.
Long Table Distillery	Vancouver	BC	Gin, vodka, akvavit, amaro, limoncello, and botanical spirits, liqueurs, barrel aged spirits	Long Table Distillery LTD	London Dry Gin, Cucumber Gin, Barrel Aged Gin, Texada Vodka, Långbord Akvavit, Rye Barrel Aged Akvavit, Limoncello, Amaro, Curaçao, Absinthe
Myriad View Artisan Distillery	Rollo Bay	PE	Moonshine, gin, vodka, brandy, rum, whisky, pastis	Myriad View Artisan Distillery	
North Spirit Distillery	Toronto	ON	Vodka	North Spirit Distillery Inc.	After Six Premium vodka
Nova Scotia Spirit Co.	Pictou County	NS	Vodka, rum, gin	Nova Scotia Spirit Co.	Blue Lobster Vodka, Fisherman's Helper White Rum, Willing to Learn Gin, Solera style Amber Rum, Cucumber Gin, The Cat Came Back old Tom style barrel conditioned Gin, Alert Cold Brewed Coffee Vodka
Ogham Craft Spirits	Ottawa	ON	Gin, poitín, eau de vie	Ogham Craft Spirits Inc.	Pot Still Gin, Poitín, Cider Eau-de-vie, Whisky
Okanagan Spirits Craft Distillery	Okanagan	BC	Absinthe, liqueurs, eau de vie, vodka, gin, whisky, single malt whisky	Okanagan Spirits Craft Distillery	Okanagan Spirits, Essential Collection, Taboo Absinthe
Old Order Distilling Co.	Penticton	BC	Single malt whisky, vodka, gin and liqueurs.	Old Order Distilling Co.	Black Goat Vodka, Legacy Gin, Heritage Vodka, Blessed Bean Coffee Vanilla Liqueur, Wicked Brew Coffee Chocolate Liqueur, Okanagan Raspberry Liqueur
Oshlag Brewery and Distillery	Montreal	QC	Vodka, gin, whiskies, brandies	BSG Group	Hopped Vodka, Fleur d'IPA, Holy Smoke Gin, McAuslan Rye, McAuslan Single Malt, Oshlag Gin
Outlaw Trail Spirits Inc.	Regina	SK	Single malt whisky, Grain Spirits, Vodka, Gin, Molasses Spirits, Liqueurs	Outlaw Trail Distilleries	Lady Luck Lemon Vodka, Calamity Jane Ginger Vodka, Climax SK Cool Cucumber Vodka, Big Beaver NWT Canadian Prairie Whisky Style Grain Spirit, Olde Foggy Bottom Single Malt, Limerick Lime Rum Style Molasses Spirit, Rustler's Regret Rum Style Molasses Spirit, Rustler's Reward Golden Rum Style Molasses Spirit, Trail Blazer Rye, Longrider BarleyCorn Whisky Style Grain Spirit, Confederation 150 Double Malt Wheat Grain Spirit
Park Distillery	Banff	AB	Vodka, gin, whisky	Park Distillery	Classic Vodka, Vanilla Vodka, Espresso Vodka, Bird's Eye Chili Vodka, Glacier Rye, Alpine Gin
Pemberton Distillery	Pemberton	BC	Vodka, gin, apple brand, single malt whisky, bourbon whiskey	Pemberton Distillery	Schramm Vodka, Schramm Gin, Pemberton Distillery Single Malt Whisky, Pemberton Distillery Bourbon Barrel Aged Apple Brandy
Prince Edward Distillery	Hermanville	PE	Potato vodka, wild blueberry vodka	Prince Edward Distillery	
RAW Distillery	Canmore	AB	Vodka, gin, whisky, rum	RAW Spirits	RAW Vodka, RAW Citrus Gin, RAW Peppercorn Gin, RAW Botanical Gin, RAW Canadian Whisky, RAW Rum
Red Cup Distillery	Vegreville	AB	Wheat shine	Red Cup	100% Wheat Shine
Rig Hand Distillery	Nisku	AB	Vodka, infused vodka, gin, whisky, cream liquor, sugar beet rum, unaged whisky	Rig Hand	Premium Vodka, Potato Vodka, Garlic Vodka, Raspberry Vodka, Sugar Beet bRum, Lemon Gin, Wildrose Gin, White Dog Unaged Whisky
Shelter Point Distillery	Black Creek	BC	Vodka, whisky	Shelter Point Distillery	Still Master Single Malt Vodka, Shelter Point Single Malt Whisky, Canada One
Still Waters Distillery	Concord	ON	Whisky, vodka	Premium Bottlers Inc.	All whiskies are branded as Stalk & Barrel: Single Malt, Rye, and Blended. Also Still Waters Vodka.
Strathcona Spirits Distillery	Edmonton	AB	Whisky, vodka, gin	Strathcona Spirits Distillery	Badland Seaberry Gin, Single Grain Vodka, Barrel Aged Gin.
The Liberty Distillery	Vancouver	BC	Whiskey, gin, vodka, white whiskey	The Liberty Distillery	Truth Vodka, Endeavour Gin, Railspur No.1 White, Trust Whiskey
Tippa Inc. Distillery	Okotoks	AB	Gin, rum, vinegar	Tippa Inc.	Tippa's Lovebird Gin, Tippa's Wood Duck Oaked Gin, Tippa's The Dino's Gin, Tippa's Magpie Rum. Also makes Alchemist Vinegar.
Top Shelf Distillers	Perth	ON	Vodka, gin, moonshine, whisky, mint liqueur and cocktail bitters	Top Shelf Distillers	Top Shelf Vodka, Top Shelf Gin, Top Shelf Bitters, Perth Canadian Whisky, Reunion Moonshine (multiple varieties) and Tom Green Canadian Moonshine
Urban Distilleries Craft Distillery	Kelowna	BC	Vodka, gin, whisky, Single malt whisky, eau de vie,	Urban Distilleries Craft Distillery	Spirit Bear, Urban
Viritus Spirits	Toronto	ON	Vodka	Viritus Spirits	Viritus Vodka
Wayward Distillation House	Courtenay	BC	Honey fermented and distilled into vodka, overproof vodka, gin, rum, infusions	Wayward Distillation House	Unruly Vodka, Unruly Gin, Wayward Order Krupnik, Drunken Hive Rum, Elixir Premium 151, Depth Charge – Espresso and Cacao Bean Liqueur
West of the 5th Distillery	Barrhead	Alberta	Vodka, Whisky, Moonshine, Brandy, Sours, Mixed Alcohol drinks	West of the 5th Distillery	W5, Barrel Yard, Grizzly Trail Vodka
Wild Life Distillery	Canmore	AB	Vodka, gin	Wild Life Distiller	Wild Life Vodka, Wild Life Gin
Wood Buffalo Brewing & Distilling	Fort McMurray	AB	Vodka, gin, whisky	Bear Hill Brewing Company	Double-smoked Whisky
Yukon Shine Distillery	Whitehorse	YT	Gin, vodka	Yukon Shine Distillery	Yukon Winter Vodka and AuraGin
Large scale distillers or multinationalsLarge scale distillers or multinationals
Cirka Distilleries	Montreal	QC	Vodka, gin, whisky	Cirka Distilleries	Vodka Terroir, Gin Sauvage
Corby Spirit and Wine	Corbyville	ON	Whisky, vodka, rum, liqueurs	Pernod Ricard	J.P. Wiser's Whisky, Polar Ice Vodka, Lamb's Rum, McGuinness Liqueur Family, Pike Creek Canadian Whisky, Lot 40 Canadian Whisky, Hiram Walker's Special Old, Royal Reserve, Cabot Trail, Ungava Premium Gin, The Foreign Affair Winery, Chic Choc
Highwood Distillers	High River	AB	Gin, rum, vodka, whisky	Highwood Distillers Ltd.	White Owl Whisky, Centennial Rye Whisky, Ninety Rye Whisky
Hiram Walker and Sons	Windsor	ON	Rum, vodka, whisky	Pernod Ricard	Canadian Club, J.P. Wiser's Whisky
Klondike River Distillery	Dawson City	YT	Vodka	Klondike River Distillery	Klondike Vodka
Two Brewers / Yukon Brewing	Whitehorse	YT	Whisky, gin, liqueur, mixed alcoholic drinks	Two Brewers, Yukon Brewing	Yukon Single Malt Whisky; Artisan Gin, New Growth Artisan Gin, Yukon Berry Eau de Vie, Coffee Raspberry Liqueur, Sparkling Haskap Lemonade, plus a range of beers and radlers

== Liquors produced ==
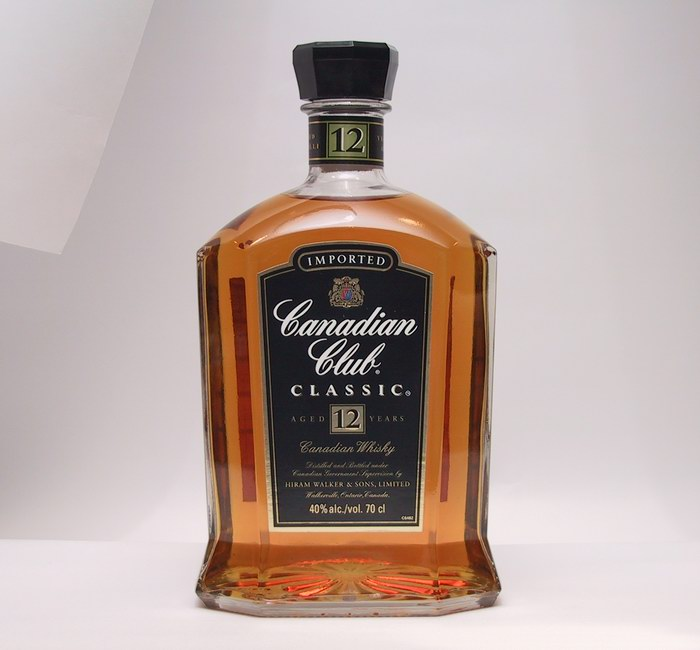
Aged Canadian whisky

The modern Canadian distilling industry produces a variety of spirits (e.g. whisky, rum, vodka, gin, liqueurs, spirit coolers, and basic ethyl alcohol), but Canada's primary reputation, domestically and internationally, remains for the production of Canadian whisky, a distinctive rye-flavoured, high quality whisky. The product is distilled from cereal grains (rye and corn primarily), aged in oak barrels for a minimum of three years, then bottled or sold in bulk. Canadian whisky captures one-quarter of the total Canadian spirits market and is the only Canadian distilled spirits product which is "appellation protected", meaning that by law it can only be produced in Canada.

== See also ==
- Alcoholic drinks in Canada
- List of whisky brands § Canadian whisky
