= Domaine Pinnacle Ice Cider =

Ice cider from Quebec, Canada

- Type: Ice Cider
- Manufacturer: Domaine Pinnacle
- Distributor: Domaine Pinnacle
- Origin: Quebec, Canada
- Introduced: 2001
- Alcohol by volume: 12.0%
- Flavour: Apple, spice and honey
- Website: domainepinnacle.com

Domaine Pinnacle Ice Cider is a Quebec ice cider introduced by Domaine Pinnacle in 2001, made from a blend of six different varieties of apples, selected from the company's family-owned orchard on the southern slopes of Mount Pinnacle.

It has a declared alcohol content of 12% alcohol by volume.

== Appearance and taste ==
Domaine Pinnacle Ice Cider has a golden colour with orange highlights. The aroma consists of apples, cinnamon, spices with a hint of honey.

It has been compared to other fine ice wines or Sauternes.

== Awards ==
Domaine Pinnacle's ice cider has won more than 60 gold medals at international wine competitions and has come to be considered one of the world leaders in ice cider.

Most recently, it received acclaim when it was presented at the Taste of London 2013 food festival. It has also won awards including gold medals at the Prix de Public, the Coupe des nations and the Mondial des cidres de glace.
