= Rocco Perri =

Italian-Canadian gangster (born 1887)

- Mug shot of Perri in the 1920s
- Born: Rocco Perre; December 30, 1887; Platì, Calabria, Italy
- Disappeared: April 23, 1944 (aged 56); Hamilton, Ontario, Canada
- Status: Missing for 82 years, 6 months and 2 days
- Other names: "The King of the Bootleggers" "Canada's Al Capone"
- Occupations: Bootlegger, mob boss
- Spouse(s): Bessie Starkman (common-law 1913; her death 1930)
- Children: 2
- Conviction: Perjury (1928)
- Penalty: Six months' imprisonment; served five months
- Accomplices: Sarah Olive Routledge (1918–1919; 1919–1920); Annie Newman (1933)

Rocco Perri (Italian: [ˈrɔkko ˈpɛrri]; born Rocco Perre; December 30, 1887 – disappeared April 23, 1944) was an Italian-Canadian organized crime figure in Hamilton, Ontario. He was one of the most prominent Prohibition-era crime figures in Canada, and was sometimes referred to as "King of the Bootleggers" and "Canada's Al Capone."

Born in the Italian town of Platì in Calabria, Perri immigrated to the United States, and later to Canada, in 1908. In the early 1910s, he started work in construction and in a bakery. Perri and his common-law wife, Bessie Starkman, began a business in bootlegging when the sale and distribution of alcohol was prohibited in both Canada and the United States. Starkman dealt mainly with the finances of the business.

In 1928, Perri was charged with perjury after a Royal Commission testimony, and served five months of a six-month prison sentence. In 1930, Starkman was ambushed in her garage and killed; no one was charged with her murder. In 1940, Perri was arrested and sent to internment at Camp Petawawa as part of the Italian Canadian internment; he was released three years later. Perri disappeared in Hamilton on April 23, 1944, when he went for a walk; his body was never found, and this caused speculation surrounding his purported death.

== Early and family life ==
Perri was born Rocco Perre in Platì, Calabria, Italy, on December 30, 1887. His family were poor shepherds, and he dropped out of school in grade 5. In the late 19th century, 80 percent of the people in Calabria were illiterate and Perri stood out in having at least some literacy. Like many other Calabrians of his generation, Perri as a young man longed to go to America with the United States being seen as a land of hope, opportunity and prosperity. He immigrated to the United States in 1903, then to Canada in 1908. Perri left for Boston in April 1903 abroad the ocean liner SS Republic on a third-class ticket. Perri soon moved to New York City, and then settled in Massena in St. Lawrence County, New York, where he worked as a general labourer. In May 1908, he moved to Montreal in search of work. In November 1908, Perri moved to Ontario and settled in Cobalt where he worked in a stone quarry owned by the railway. Perri who disliked the harsh winters in northern Ontario lived a semi-nomadic life as he lived in Cobalt in the spring and summer while spending his falls and winters in Toronto. Perri later said of his early years in Canada: "We were treated worse than the Blacks but, unlike them, we couldn't speak English."

During this period, Perri began to engage in crime as he wrote coded letters in Italian full of references to "furniture" and "stuff" that he was always selling and buying to men with criminal records. In May 1912, Perri hired a man, Camillo Tuzoni, to burn down a house in North Bay that was owned by Donato Glionna as a part of extortion bid. Tuzoni after his arrest for arson named Perri as the man who hired him. In the spring of 1912, Perri settled in Toronto permanently.

In 1912, Perri met Bessie Starkman, a Polish Jew who had immigrated to Canada circa 1900, while he lived as a boarder in her family home in The Ward, Toronto, Ontario, with her husband Harry Toben and their two children. Shortly after, Perri began an affair with Starkman, and when he got a job working on the Welland Canal in 1913, she left her husband and children to move in with Perri in St. Catharines and begin a common-law relationship. After a few weeks of living with Perri, Starkman attempted to return to her husband, who refused to accept her. Starkman later said of her life with Perri in St. Catharines: "We had no friends. We ate bread and swallowed insults. We were marginalized among those who, as immigrants, were already marginalized." In a letter to his mother in Italy, Perri wrote: We used to work risking not only our health, but in many cases our lives."

When the Canadian government cut funding to the Welland Canal project due to World War I, Perri became unemployed. After working in a bakery, he was hired as a salesman for the Superior Macaroni Company. However, Perri and Starkman found a better means of income when the Ontario Temperance Act came into effect on September 16, 1916, as it restricted the sale and distribution of alcohol. The couple began bootlegging; using Starkman's business acumen and Perri's connections, they established a profitable enterprise. It was Starkman who suggested bootlegging, but Perri used his network of his Italian friends to create the Perri-Starkman gang. Alcohol was still legal in Quebec, and Perri used his network of friends in Montreal to buy alcohol to smuggle into Ontario. By this time the two lived in Hamilton, Ontario, and by 1920, moved into a larger home at 166 Bay Street South. Perri and Starkman also opened brothels in Hamilton, at the time the city with the highest percentage of its women engaged in prostitution in North America. On March 9, 1917, the Hamilton police raided the house at 157 Caroline Street North owned by Perri and Starkman and arrested Starkman for keeping a bawdy house after the police discovered a prostitute, Mary Ashley, engaged in her trade at the house. Starkman was convicted and fined $50. On November 17, 1917, Starkman gave birth to a son by Perri, but the child died after only two days. On April 1, 1918, the Dominion government banned alcohol everywhere in Canada, a law that remained in effect until December 31, 1919. Perri and Starkman had to smuggle alcohol from the United States into Canada to maintain their business.

In 1918, Perri began an affair with Sarah Olive Routledge, with whom he had two daughters; Autumn (born in 1919), and Catherine (born in 1921). After Autumn was born, Perri had refused to marry Routledge, but he did maintain a home for her in St. Catharines and paid child support. Their affair resumed in 1920. Perri's job as a macaroni salesman required travel across Ontario; he also used those trips to arrange the sale of liquor. Starkman, busy running the finances for their organization, did not question Perri's outings. In February 1922, Routledge was falsely told by Perri's lawyer that he was already married to Starkman. Despondent, Routledge committed suicide by jumping from her lawyer's seventh-story office window of the Bank of Hamilton; her parents took custody of their children. In the 1930s, Perri asked to see his daughters on weekends, although their grandmother would always accompany them for fear that he would take them.

On December 31, 1918, Perri and Starkman were hosting a party where two of the guests, Alberto Naticchio and Antonio Martino, become engaged in a dispute. The two men went outside and Naticchio shot Martino who died later that night of blood loss. Perri gave the police the false name of Rocco Suseno, which led him to be charged with lying to a police officer when the police discovered his real name. Perri was charged with selling alcohol on January 3, 1919, and three days later, was convicted. Perri was fined $1,000, but his lawyer, Michael O'Reilly, had the fine reduced to $700 on an appeal.

Starkman was the head of operations and the duo's negotiator and dealmaker, until August 13, 1930, when she was ambushed at around 11:15 p.m. as she got out of Perri's car in the garage of the couple's home. Perri ran down the street after the assailants before retreating back to Starkman, who had been killed with two shotgun blasts. With tears in his eyes, Perri told reporters the next day "I'd give up all my money just to have Bessie still here with me. I've lost my best pal". Police found two double-barreled shotguns and the getaway car without fingerprints. The investigation eventually resulted in no criminal charges being brought despite a $5,000 reward offered by Perri. However, it was thought that Calabrian compatriot Antonio Papalia, leader of the Papalia crime family and father of Johnny Papalia, played a role in the murder. The stolen license plates used on the car that Starkman's killers had fled were taken from a car parked in an automobile repair shop where Antonio "Tony" Papalia worked. Papalia told the police when questioned: "I've got nothing to do with it. But even if I knew something, I would certainly wouldn't tell you about it." Perri told the reporters about Papalia's possible involvement: "If it were true, I wouldn't be surprised." Two weeks after Starkman's murder, Perri had a will written up, saying he was in fear of his life and "I don't trust anybody." Perri added the clause to his will: "I direct that in the event of my death occurring under any unnatural circumstances that my executor investigate same and if any of my beneficiaries are in any way suspected of having anything to do with my unnatural death, their share of my estate shall be forfeited."

On August 17, about 20,000 people lined the street for the funeral cortege of hundreds of vehicles; Perri fainted at the gravesite. At the funeral, as the rabbi said kaddish (the prayer for the dead), Perri broke down in tears and fainted. Starkman's headstone in Hamilton's Ohev Zedek Cemetery, commissioned by Perri, referred to her as "Bessie Starkman – Perri," but the "Perri" part was later removed by persons unknown. Part of Starkman's estate went to Perri, and the rest to her children. By 1933, Perri was living with another woman, Annie Newman, who helped him to improve his criminal enterprise. The couple profited from enterprises such as bootlegging and drug trafficking. "Annie was just as corrupt and business-like as Bessie," according to one source. In 1943, Newman was imprisoned for smuggling gold.

== Criminal operations ==
Perri and Starkman survived financially in the few years after 1915 from his income as a macaroni salesman and the grocery store on Hess Street. After the Ontario Temperance Act was passed in 1916, making the sale of alcohol illegal, the couple started selling shots of Canadian whisky on the side. Their bootlegging was done on a small scale, with their kitchen as the centre of operations.

Bootlegging became a larger and more profitable enterprise when Prohibition was declared in Canada nationwide on April 1, 1918, and the Eighteenth Amendment that prohibited sale of alcohol in the United States in 1920. Through the 1920s, Perri became the leading figure in organized crime in Southern Ontario and was under constant surveillance by police. The government allowed for numerous exceptions, allowing various breweries and distilleries to remain open for the export market.

Perri specialized in exporting liquor from old Canadian distilleries, such as Seagram and Gooderham and Worts, to the United States, and helped these companies obtain a large share of the American market — a share they kept after Prohibition ended in Ontario in 1927, and the United States in 1933. Perri sold alcohol to the Chicago Outfit via the Purple Gang of Detroit, and he was described as the largest source of Canadian whiskey in Chicago. He has also been linked as a distributor of Canadian whisky to New York City's Frank Costello and Chicago's Al Capone, yet when Capone was asked by Daily Toronto Star reporter Roy Greenaway if he knew Perri, Capone said "Why, I don't even know which street Canada is on." Other sources, however, claim that Capone had certainly visited Canada, where he maintained some hideaways, but the Royal Canadian Mounted Police states that there is no "evidence that he ever set foot on Canadian soil." Perri also sold trainloads of liquor into Chicago and Detroit through Niagara Falls and Windsor, Ontario. During Prohibition, "The authorities were quite happy to turn a blind eye to bootlegging, and also to take payoffs ... and Rocco had all the important police in Hamilton ... on his payroll" according to author Trevor Cole. Stefano Speranza, a member of the Chicago Outfit, described Perri as "the most powerful boss in Canada."

Around 1920, the Ontario underworld was dominated by three crime families, the Scaroni family based in Guelph, the Serianni family based in Niagara Falls and the Gagliardo family based in Toronto. Perri managed to remain on good ties with all three families for a time, but came to be aligned against the Scaroni family when two Serianni family members, Domenic Speranza and Domenic Paproni, killed a Scaroni family member, Joe Celona, in his presence. On June 18, 1921, James Saunders, the bodyguard-chauffeur for the Scaroni family was found murdered outside of Welland via a knife; in his coat pocket was a piece of paper with Perri's home address on it. On May 10, 1922, the boss of the Scaroni crime family, Domenic Scaroni, was killed after being invited to a meeting of organized crime figures in Niagara Falls. At Scaroni's funeral on May 13, 1922 in Guelph, Perri served as one of the pallbearers along with Antonio Deconza, Frank Longo, Frank Romeo, and the D'Agostiono brothers. On June 15, 1922, Salvatore Scaroni, the cousin to Domenic, was wounded in a failed murder attempt in Niagara Falls. Scaroni's brother Joe Scaroni along with Salvatore Scaroni were killed on September 4, after being driven to a bakery by Perri associates John Trott and Antonio Deconza. Perri was linked to the murders, though no evidence was found. With the Scaroni brothers eliminated, Perri formed an allegiance with the Serianni crime family to keep the Ontario market out of the hands of the Magaddino crime family in Buffalo, New York.

Perri soon diversified into gambling, extortion, and prostitution. He and Starkman were also reported to have taken part in the narcotics trade as early as 1922, when the Royal Canadian Mounted Police suspected Perri of "dealing in narcotics on a large scale." By 1924, when the average wage for a construction worker was $42 per week, Perri and Starkman made an annual profit of $1 million. Perri employed about 100 men and was in charge of the operational aspects of the gang. Starkman, who was more literate than Perri, handled the financial aspects of the business and chose the suppliers of alcohol. Starkman mastered Italian and usually spoke to Perri in the Calabrian dialect of Italian that was his preferred means of speech. By contrast, Perri never learned Yiddish, which was Starkman's first language. Starkman made the alliance with Clifford Hatch, the owner of the Gooderham & Worts distillery that had relocated to Montreal in 1916, after the Temperance Act. Hatch wanted to keep selling alcohol in Ontario where his brand had been well known ever since Gooderham & Worts had been founded in 1832 while Starkman saw the importance of selling high quality and safe alcohol to allow the Perri-Starkman gang to seize market share from other bootleggers. Bootleggers often brewed alcohol under unsafe conditions and diluted their alcohol with mineral oil, formaldehyde, acetone, formic acid, sulfuric acid, and creosote. Death and blindness from drinking tainted alcohol were major problems in the 1920s, and drinkers sought out bootleggers who sold safe alcohol.

Perri very much wanted British citizenship (until 1947 a separate Canadian citizenship did not exist) and on March 13, 1922 he applied for British citizenship in Wentworth County. Perri's citizenship application made the front page news of the Hamilton Herald newspaper, leading to objections from Thora McIroy, the president of the Hamilton chapter of the Citizenship Committee of the Local Council of Women. McIroy wrote a public letter stating that Perri "is not a man of good moral character and is not a fit person to be naturalized in Canada." On March 24, 1922, William Whatley, the Hamilton police chief, wrote to the Dominion government that Perri had criminal convictions for leaving the scene of an automobile accident in 1918, for lying to a police officer and a breach of the Temperance Act in January 1919 and another conviction in July 1919 for allowing "a ferocious dog to be at large." On April 12, 1922, Perri's citizenship application was denied. On May 6, 1922, Perri launched an appeal where he presented himself as misunderstood and maligned. On May 15, his appeal was rejected with his explanations for his behavior be ruled "not very convincing."

On November 19, 1924, in an exclusive interview with the Toronto Daily Star, he stated, "My men do not carry guns ... If I find that they do, I get rid of them. It is not necessary. I provide them with high-powered cars. That is enough. If they cannot run away from the police it is their fault. But guns make trouble. My men do not use them." He also did not view himself as a criminal, believing that Prohibition was "a law that people did not want." Perri openly admitted that he was a bootlegger as he told an American journalist: "All I ever did was to sell beer and whisky to our best people... They call me a bootlegger, and some people call bootleggers criminals. I am simply supplying the demand of millions of law-abiding and law-making citizens. I sell liquor to judges, bankers, senators, governors, mayors, and I have preachers I sell wine to. It is not more criminal to supply this liquor than barter for, possess and consume it. I am willing to be classed in the same category with judges, bankers, senators, governors, mayors and other well known people, call them what you like."

Perri typically shipped his illegal alcohol into the United States overland, but also owned a boat for crossing Lake Ontario. On December 1, 1926, a boat owned by Perri was seized in Hamilton harbour with 100 cases of Canadian whiskey meant for the American market. He had a limited business relationship with bootlegger Ben Kerr, who also owned a home on Bay Street. Kerr was described by the some as "King of the Lake Ontario rum-runners" (smugglers who typically used boats). Kerr was operating within Perri's territory, but the latter required Kerr to smuggle raw American alcohol into Ontario, and may also have allowed Kerr to sell alcohol in a certain part of New York State in return for the payment of a commission. These ventures enabled Kerr to expand his operations and to remain a solid customer of distilleries such as Gooderham & Worts and Corby's. Kerr and his boat Pollywog disappeared in February 1929; weeks later, his body and some wreckage from his boat were found on the shore of Lake Ontario near Colborne. Based on his research, author C.W. Hunt theorized that Perri was likely responsible for Kerr's death, perhaps using his own, more effectively-armoured boat, the Uncas. Hunt conceded that there were two other possible causes: "misadventure" (a marine accident) as stated by the coroner, or an act by the Staud brothers with their well armed/armoured boat.

One report estimates that in the mid-1920s, Perri and Starkman were generating C$1 million per year through criminal endeavors and had a hundred employees. In that era, Perri was a "big spender" and the couple lived an opulent lifestyle. Nonetheless, Perri paid only $13.30 in income tax based on employment as a macaroni salesman and his "export/mail order" business in 1926; Starkman, who claimed to be supporting him, paid $96.43. At about that time, some reports indicated that she had between $500,000 and $1M in deposits at various banks. That same year, Perri faced criminal charges in the death of 17 people who died after drinking illegal liquor, but was acquitted of the charges. When Perri turned himself in to face the manslaughter charges in Hamilton on July 31, 1926, it was the biggest news story in the American and Canadian newspapers that day. Even the United States president Calvin Coolidge spoke about Perri's arrest at a press conference at the White House, which he used as evidence that the Canadian authorities were trying to stop bootlegging into the United States. A woman involved in bootlegging, Mildred Cooney Sterling, told an undercover policeman on August 26, 1926: "No one would ever dare to go against Rocco Perri. He is entirely too powerful." About the tainted alcohol that had caused the deaths of 45 people in Ontario and New York state, she added that Perri had smuggled in the toxic alcohol, but he "...would under all circumstances, prevent the poison liquor from coming in... Rocco Perri and other millionaire rum-runners do not have to handle poisonous liquor because they can make more money with less trouble by handling the straight goods." On January 13, 1927, Perri was acquitted when the Crown was unable to establish that he was aware that the alcohol was tainted.

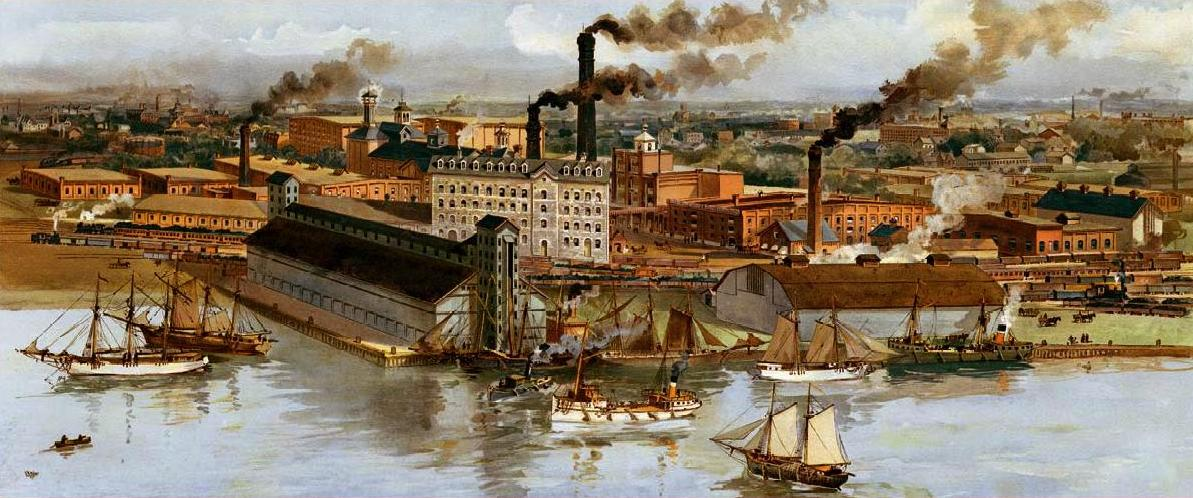
Gooderham and Worts, one of Perri's suppliers, as it appeared in 1896

On June 1, 1927, alcohol was legalized in Ontario again. However, the Ontario government forced bars and liquor stores to close early, which still made bootlegging in Ontario profitable as many people wanted to drink past the early closing time. In 1927, Perri was compelled to testify at the Royal Commission on Customs and Excise inquiry, focusing on bootlegging and smuggling, and also at a hearing on tax evasion charges against Gooderham and Worts. Later that year, at the Gooderham and Worts tax evasion hearing, Perri admitted to buying whisky from the distiller from 1924 to 1927. Gooderham and Worts was convicted of tax evasion in 1928 and ordered to pay a fine of $439,744. Perri and Starkman were charged with perjury after their Royal Commission testimony, but in a plea bargain, the charges were dropped against Starkman; Perri served five months of a six-month sentence and was released on September 27, 1928. On June 15, 1929, an undercover officer of the Royal Canadian Mounted Police, Frank Zaneth, reported to his superiors that he had learned "that Rocco Perri was the big gun in the smuggling and distribution of narcotic drugs in this province." On May 26, 1930, Giuseppe Pennestri, who used the alias Joe Leo, vanished in Sudbury. Leo left behind a note in a safe deposit box which warned that if he vanished, it would be a case of murder as he accused two Perri associates, Domenico and James D'Agostino of plotting his murder so they "can take my wife and my money." The body of Leo was never discovered.

On August 2, 1930, Perri and Mike Serge were charged with illegal possession of 10 US gallons (38 L) of liquor, but nine days later, both men were acquitted. Starkman was murdered on August 13, 1930. Perri started relations with Joe Leo's widow, Maria Vincentia Rossetti, who used the alias Jessie Leo. In October 1930, Jesse Leo confirmed her relationship with Perri to journalists and hinted she would marry him. By 1931, the Great Depression had led to a 31 percent unemployment rate in Ontario, and the Canadian authorities openly tolerated Perri's bootlegging into the United States as a way to reduce unemployment. In response to threats from the United States government to raise tariffs on Canadian goods, the Canadian government banned the export of alcohol. In turn, the bootleggers took to smuggling Canadian alcohol into the United States via Cuba and Mexico, a choice of routes that hurt Perri financially. Perri's bodyguard/chauffeur Frank Di Pietro later stated: "He felt cornered, as if everyone was plotting against him. He acted in a strange way. In one day alone he lost $100,000 at the racetrack." On October 5, 1932, the Hamilton police raided a hose on Concession Street where 26,000 US gallons (98,000 L) of whisky meant for the United States was seized. Charged were Mary Latika, Perri's maid, and Tony Marando, Perri's cousin. The raid costed Perri $28,000 in inventory. On December 5, 1933, Prohibition ended in the United States as the new president, Franklin Roosevelt, shepherded the Twenty-first Amendment to the United States Constitution which made alcohol legal again in the United States. The end of Prohibition ended Perri's main source of income, and led to engage in new crimes such as counterfeiting.

By the 1930s, Perri had become legendary figure in his native Calabria with popular rumor having it that he "was the richest man in Canada." In 1937, Perri returned to Toronto where he purchased a house with his new common-law wife, Annie Newman. To support himself, Perri turned to running a network of illegal gambling houses in Toronto. Between 1937 and 1939, Perri owned a brewery on Fleet Street in Toronto. In 1938, two attempts were made to kill Perri: on March 20, his veranda was destroyed by dynamite that had been placed underneath it, and on November 23, a bomb under his car detonated. Perri was not injured in either attempt. Perri was the prime suspect behind the murder of a Toronto bookie, James Windsor, who was competing with his gambling houses. While interviewing Perri, two Toronto police detectives, Orrie Young and Herbert Witthun, noticed a .25-calibre pistol in the living room. Annie Newman claimed that gun was hers and she was fined $25 on January 12, 1939 for owning an illegal gun.

On August 30, 1939, Perri was charged with the corruption of public officials with the Crown alleging that he had bribed seven customs officers in Windsor to assist with his struggling across the border. One of the Customs officers, David Armaly, had agreed to turn Crown's evidence and testified that Perri had bribed him as he received $25 for every one of Perri's cars that were allowed to cross into the United States uninspected. On the same day that he was arrested, Perri was interviewed by journalists with the discussion turning to the Danzig crisis. Italy signed the Pact of Steel with Germany earlier that year, and several journalists asked what Perri would do if Italy were at war with Britain. Perri replied: "Canada is my country. Canada is part of the British empire. I would fight for it. I left Italy more than twenty-five years ago. I don't remember much about it." The next day, the Daily Toronto Star ran as its headline "War worries Rocco, he's ready to fight." Perri was defended at his trial by Paul Martin Sr., who always so well informed about the Crown's case that it was believed that one of the Crown Attorneys was selling information, but which Crown Attorney was never established. Martin made much of the fact that Armaly had engaged in welfare fraud, which he used to paint him as a man engaged in perjury. On February 1, 1940, Perri was acquitted.

== Internment ==
In 1940, Perri and his brother Mike were arrested and sent to internment at Camp Petawawa as part of the Italian Canadian internment, as potentially dangerous enemy aliens with alleged connections to Benito Mussolini's fascist regime. The Royal Canadian Mounted Police arrested Perri along with Antonio Papalia, Frank Silvestro, Mike Sergi, John Taglerino, and Charles Delcastro of Hamilton along with Domenic Longo and Domenic Belcastro of Guelph. A group of Mounties arrived at Perri's Hamilton house, where he was arrested without incident. One prisoner at Camp Petawaw, Osvaldo Giacomelli, recalled: "Perri never gave himself airs. He played cards often, but he avoided any conversation concerning activities that he was supposedly involved in." Perri was described as a well behaved and polite prisoner who suffered from depression as 1941 turned into 1942 while he became very nostalgic for Calabria.

During this internment, Perri served some time with Antonio Papalia, who was released two years before Perri. When Perri saw Papalia arrive at Camp Petawawa, he shouted at him in Italian: "I should slap you black and blue!" Papalia replied "just try" and only the prompt intervention of the guards stopped a brawl between the two gangsters. When he returned to his tent, Perri swore like he never been seen to do before as he cursed Papalia as a friend who had betrayed him. Perri was greatly angered by the way that Papalia had allied himself with his old enemy, Stefano Magaddino. Upon his release, Papalia then began to expand his enterprise with his son Johnny, who had some relationship with the Buffalo crime family. On October 17, 1943, the Justice Minister, Louis St. Laurent, ordered Perri released. Perri found that Ontario underworld was now dominated by Papalia, Bordonaro, and Silvestro who were serving as the agents of Magaddino, who did not want Perri involved in the underworld again.

== Disappearance and aftermath ==
Rocco Perri was last seen alive in Hamilton on April 23, 1944, at the home of a cousin, Joe Serge, on Murray Street West. According to a Maclean's magazine report from June 15 of that year, Perri was then "working as a doorman in a Toronto theatre." Before lunch, he complained of a headache and went for a walk to clear his head but never returned.

Perri's body has never been found, though it is speculated he was murdered by being fitted with cement shoes and thrown into Burlington Bay—a practice known colloquially as the lupara bianca. It is believed Antonio and Johnny Papalia, along with Stefano Magaddino of Buffalo, played a role in Perri's disappearance to gain better control of the Canadian alcohol market. In 1944–45, the Papalias hunted down and killed all of Perri's allies such as Jouhn Durso and Louis Wernick, which completed Magaddino's control of the Ontario underworld. The Royal Canadian Mounted Police concluded in 1954 that they "won't find his body until the Bay dries up." After Perri's disappearance, three of his former lieutenants, in addition to Papalia and Giacomo Luppino, began answering to Magaddino in Buffalo: Tony Sylvestro, Calogero Bordonaro, and Santo Scibetta, known as the "three dons."

=== Later developments ===
In 1992, evidence into Perri's disappearance was uncovered by Mafia expert Antonio Nicaso. A letter shared with him by Perri's cousin in Italy, dated June 10, 1949, and translated from Italian, read, "Dear cousin, With this letter, I will tell you I am in good health. Let them know I'm fine if you've heard the news." It is signed Rocco Perri. Perri's cousin also claims that the gangster died in 1953 in Massena, New York. In 2018, Perri's relatives from Hamilton and Australia, during an attempt to collect on the late mobster's estate, claimed that he had lived in Massena under the name Giuseppe Portolesi before dying of natural causes in 1953. The group's Andrew Monterosso said that he had made a good living through legal ventures such as the ownership of properties in the United States and in Mexico.

In 1998, a last will and testament from 1930 surfaced; it was purported to be that of Perri, but there is doubt that he was ever declared dead. A CBC News report in 2012 stated that "there's no death certificate out there for Rocco Perri." The group attempting to access the mobster's estate said in 2018 that there was no social insurance number or death certificate, and that the Canada Revenue Agency had transferred the funds from Perri's estate to Italy in 2008.

== In popular culture ==
In July 2014, the first performance of a one-woman play about Starkman's life, Bootlegger's Wife, was staged at Theatre Aquarius in Hamilton, Ontario. The creator and star was Victoria Murdoch; while the Perri character does not appear, "voiceovers" provide his comments. The play was staged again in mid-March 2019 and at intervals between those dates.

Stefano DiMatteo portrays Perri in "Parker in the Rye" (January 6, 2020), episode 10 of season 13 of the Canadian television series Murdoch Mysteries.

== See also ==
- List of people who disappeared

== Books ==
- Nicaso, Antonio (2004). Rocco Perri The Story of Canada's Most Notorious Bootlegger. Toronto: John Wiley & sons. ISBN 9780470835265.
