= Bessie Starkman =

Jewish-Canadian gangster

- Born: Besha Starkman; June 21, 1890 (Note: June 21, 1890, is the birth date according to her headstone, however, April 14, 1889, is another birth date used.); Poland
- Died: August 13, 1930 (aged 40); Hamilton, Ontario, Canada
- Resting place: Ohev Zedek Cemetery, Hamilton, Ontario
- Occupation: Bootlegger
- Spouse(s): Harry Toben (m. 1908; sep. 1913) Rocco Perri (common-law 1913)
- Children: 2

Bessie Starkman (born Besha Starkman; June 21, 1890 – August 13, 1930) was an organized crime figure in Hamilton, Ontario, Canada, in the early 20th century. She and her common-law husband, Italian-born Rocco Perri, established a business in bootlegging after the sale and distribution of alcohol was prohibited in both Canada and the United States. Starkman dealt mainly with the finances of the business.

== Early and family life ==
Bessie Starkman was born in the Kingdom of Poland within the vast Russian Empire on June 21, 1890, to Jewish parents Shimon and Gello Starkman. Starkman immigrated to Canada circa 1900, settled in The Ward, Toronto, Ontario with her parents, and married Harry Toben by the age of 18. The couple were married in Toronto on 15 December 1907. She had two daughters with Toben, Gertrude and Lilly. Starkman found life as a housewife within a traditional Orthodox Jewish household to be unbearable and she longed to escape from her marriage.

In 1912, Starkman met Rocco Perri, an Italian immigrant, while he lived as a boarder in her family home. Shortly after, Perri began an affair with Starkman, and when he got a job working on the Welland Canal in 1913, she left her husband and children to move in with Perri in St. Catharines and begin a common-law relationship. After a few weeks of living with Perri, Starkman attempted to return to her husband, who refused to accept her. Starkman later said of her life with Perri in St. Catharines: "We had no friends. We ate bread and swallowed insults. We were marginalized among those who, as immigrants, were already marginalized". In a letter to his mother in Italy, Perri wrote: "We used to work risking not only our health, but in many cases our lives".

When the Canadian government cut funding to the Welland Canal project due to World War I, Perri became unemployed. After working in a bakery, he was hired as a salesman for the Superior Macaroni Company. However, Perri and Starkman found a better means of income when the Ontario Temperance Act came into effect on September 16, 1916, as it restricted the sale and distribution of alcohol. The couple began bootlegging; using Starkman's business acumen and Perri's connections, they established a profitable enterprise. It was Starkman who suggested bootlegging, but Perri used his network of Italian friends to create the Perri-Starkman gang. Alcohol was still legal in Quebec, and Perri used his network of friends in Montreal to buy alcohol to smuggle into Ontario. By this time the two lived in Hamilton, Ontario, and by 1920, moved into a larger home at 166 Bay Street South. Perri and Starkman also opened brothels in Hamilton, at the time the city with the highest percentage of its women engaged in prostitution in North America. On 9 March 1917, the Hamilton police raided the house at 157 Caroline Street North owned by Perri and Starkman and arrested Starkman for keeping a common bawdy house after the police discovered a prostitute, Mary Ashley, engaged in her trade at the house. Starkman was convicted and fined $50. On 17 November 1917, Starkman gave birth to a son by Perri, but the child died after only two days. On 1 April 1918, the Dominion government banned alcohol everywhere in Canada, a law that remained in effect until 31 December 1919. Perri and Starkman had to smuggle alcohol from the United States into Canada to maintain their business.

In 1918, Perri began an affair with Sarah Olive Routledge, with whom he had two daughters. After his first child was born, Perri had refused to marry Routledge, but he maintained a home for her in St. Catharines and paid child support. Their affair resumed in 1920. Perri's job as a macaroni salesman required travel across Ontario; he also used those trips to arrange the sale of liquor. Starkman, busy running the finances for their organization, did not question Perri's outings. In February 1922, Routledge was falsely told by Perri's lawyer that he was already married to Starkman. Despondent, Routledge committed suicide by jumping from her lawyer's seventh-story office window of the Bank of Hamilton; her parents took custody of their children.

== Criminal operations ==
Perri and Starkman survived financially in the few years after 1915 from his income as a macaroni salesman and their grocery store on Hess Street. After the Ontario Temperance Act was passed in 1916, making the sale of alcohol illegal, the couple started selling shots of Canadian whisky on the side. Their bootlegging was done on a small scale, with their kitchen as the centre of operations. Bootlegging became a much larger and more profitable enterprise when Prohibition was declared in Canada nationwide on April 1, 1918 and the Eighteenth Amendment that prohibited sale of alcohol in the United States in 1920. Prohibition on the federal level ended in Canada on 31 December 1919. However, the only province where alcohol was legal was Quebec with the other eight provinces all being "dry".

Through the 1920s, Perri became the leading figure in organized crime in Southern Ontario and was under constant surveillance by police. The government allowed for numerous exceptions, allowing various breweries and distilleries to remain open for the export market. Starkman was the head of operations and the duo's negotiator and dealmaker. Perri diversified into gambling, extortion and prostitution. The couple were also reported to have taken part in drug trafficking as early as 1922, when the Royal Canadian Mounted Police (RCMP) suspected Perri of "dealing in narcotics on a large scale."

Both Perri and Starkman were friends with William Whatley, the police chief of Hamilton. Whatley, who had been born in rural Somerset in 1878 was a veteran of the Boer War who had settled in Canada in 1907 and joined the Hamilton police force in 1910. A colourful, striking figure who dressed flamboyantly and ran the Hamilton police force in a militaristic style, Whatley was very fond of gambling on horses, and he was so close to Starkman that the tabloids accused them of having an affair. In a heavy-handed attempt to silence criticism, Whatley jailed a lawyer who had accused him along with Starkman of cheating him in a deal involving the sale of Canadian government bonds under the grounds to criticize him indicated insanity. In March 1923, the Attorney General of Ontario ordered an investigation into Whatley's business and possibly romantic relationship with Starkman and only Whatley's abrupt death from pneumonia on 17 April 1923 saved him being charged for corruption.

Starkman realized that to win market share in both Canada and the United States required the gang to sell high-quality and safe alcohol. In 1924, she negotiated the alliance with Harry C. Hatch, the owner and CEO of the famous Gooderham & Worts distillery. Gooderham & Worts had been one of the most popular brands of alcohol in Ontario ever since the firm had been founded in 1832, but the company had forced to relocate to Quebec following the banning of alcohol in Ontario in 1916. Hatch was quite willing to sell alcohol to Starkman and Perri provided the orders were placed though his lawyer, and in exchange Starkman obtained the exclusive rights to sell Gooderham & Worts alcohol outside of Quebec, including in the lucrative American market. Hatch stated about his business relationship with the Perri-Starkman gang: "The Volstead Act doesn't stop us from exporting our whisky south of the border; it does, however, prohibit Americans from importing it. There's a big difference".

Besides Gooderham & Worts, Starkman made deals with the Hiram Walker distillery of Windsor, the Corby distillery of Belleville, the Tayor & Bate Brewery of St. Catharines, the Kuntz brewery of Kitchener and the Seagram's distillery of Waterloo. At the time, many "moonshiners" (home brewers) brewed their alcohol under unsafe conditions and added toxic substances such as formaldehyde, acetone, formic acid, mineral oil, sulfuric acid and creosote to their alcohol to increase their profits by keeping their production costs as low as possible. As such, illness and death from drinking tainted alcohol were major problems in the 1920s in the United States and in the "dry" areas of Canada. The Gooderham & Worts alcohol brewed in Montreal, ostensibly only for sale in Quebec, by contrast was known to be safe to drink and the exclusive contract that Starkman negotiated with Hatch proved to be a major factor in the rise of the Perri-Starkman gang. A report by the Ontario Provincial Police dated 5 August 1926 about the smuggling of alcohol from Quebec into Ontario declared: "One hundred and twenty-five cases is the usual load, three trips weekly being made, although in one week I remember five trips being made. Mrs. Perri [Starkman] appears to be the head of all the Hamilton operations. The orders are all placed by her over long distance telephone...Payments are made in cash in Hamilton...and in no single instance was Rocco Perry's [Perri's] name mentioned".

Starkman who was both more literate and numerate than Perri ran the financial aspects of the Perri-Starkman gang while Perri handled the operational side of the business. "Roc and Bess" as the couple were known appeared to enjoy each other's company and their relationship seemed happy. The Italian-Canadian journalist Antonio Nicaso wrote: "Up to that time, a woman's role in the underworld was relegated to wife and mother, or mistress and prostitute. Until Bessie came along, none had been in a position of authority in a major crime gang-let alone entrusted to manage a massive flow of dirty money". Starkman was known for dressing in a modernist "flapper" style with her hair cut short while wearing expensive clothing and jewelry. She was a great fan of the music of Louis Armstrong, Duke Ellington, Bessie Smith and Scott Joplin and avidly collected the records of their songs. The house she co-owned with Perri at 166 Bay Street South was the first Hamilton home to have a radio. Their house was valued at $6,100, which was the equivalent of what a construction worker could expect to earn after 15 years of working. Starkman had a moody, sullen personality with many considering her to be a "difficult" woman. Unlike Perri, who was known for being generous with money, Starkman was known for being frugal and tight with money. Perri did not oppose Starkman in financial matters, and she was known to impose loans with onerous conditions on Perri's cousins who were also engaged in bootlegging. Starkman became fluent in the Calabrian dialect of Italian that was Perri's native tongue and she usually spoke to him in this dialect.

"Bessie was a somewhat vain woman who was somewhat ruthless but undoubtedly very smart ... Rocco had the network of men they needed for distribution and enforcement, but Bessie understood business. She advised him, encouraged him and facilitated a lot of what he did. She had an innate understanding of how to take advantage of certain situations ... People have a kind of romantic view that Bessie was responsible for much of what they did in bootlegging, but it's certainly clear that she was responsible for the narcotics traffic ... That was her impetus, it was her baby."

— Trevor Cole, author of the book "The Whisky King", on Starkman's role in Perri's enterprises.

One report estimates that in the mid-1920s, Perri and Starkman were generating C$1 million per year through criminal endeavours and had a hundred employees. In that era, Perri was a "big spender" and the couple lived an opulent lifestyle. Nonetheless, Perri paid only $13.30 in income tax based on employment as a macaroni salesman and his "export/mailorder" business in 1926; Starkman, who claimed to be supporting him, paid $96.43. At about that time, some reports indicated that she had between $500,000 and one million in deposits at various banks. In that same year, Perri faced criminal charges in the death of seventeen people who died after drinking illegal liquor, but was acquitted of the charges.

In 1927, Perri was compelled to testify at the Royal Commission on Customs and Excise inquiry, focusing on bootlegging and smuggling, and also at a hearing on tax evasion charges against Gooderham and Worts. Later that year, at the Gooderham and Worts tax evasion hearing, Perri admitted buying whisky from the distiller from 1924 to 1927. Gooderham and Worts was convicted of tax evasion in 1928 and ordered to pay a fine of $439,744. Perri and Starkman were charged with perjury after their Royal Commission testimony, but in a plea bargain, the charges were dropped against Starkman; Perri served five months of a six-month sentence and was released on September 27, 1928.

In 1929, an undercover officer of the Royal Canadian Mounted Police (RCMP), Frank Zaneth, infiltrated the Perri-Starkman gang. On the basis of information gathered by him, on 29 June 1929 the RCMP arrested Nazzareno "Ned" Italiano at his house in Hamilton. Found inside of Italiano's house were $3,500 worth of cocaine, heroin and morphine along with a large quantity of cash. As the Mounties were taking Italiano from the second floor to the ground floor of his house, Starkman happened to walk into the Italiano house. The Mounties searched her and found she had a large quantity of cash on her, but lacking probable cause, they were unable to arrest her. In September 1929, Zaneth under one of his disguises met Starkman with the request that she sell him cocaine, morphine and heroin. Starkman told Zaneth that she needed more time to research his background before selling him anything and on 23 September 1929 Zaneth appeared in court as a witness for the Crown at the trial of Italiano, which put an end to his undercover work. In a report dated 25 September 1929 Zaneth wrote "Mrs. Perri [Starkman] is the brains of the whole gang and nothing is being done without her consent".

On 27 September 1929, Italiano was convicted of trafficking in heroin and sentenced to five years in prison. Italiano was offered a plea bargain by the Crown under which his sentence would be reduced in exchange for testifying against Starkman and Perri, but he literally observed Omertà by saying nothing in response. In a major violation of the Mafia code which calls for a boss to financially support the wife and children of a Mafioso who observes omertà while he is in prison, Starkman refused to support Italiano's wife and children. Italiano was the first cousin to Maria Rosa Italiano, the wife of Antonio Papalia, who was greatly angered at this violation of the Mafia code. Papalia was one of Perri's more important subordinates. Papalia was especially annoyed because the burden of supporting Italiano's wife and children fell upon him in default. Papalia asked Perri as his boss to observe the Mafia code, but Perri told him that he was unwilling to challenge Starkman. Papalia came to hate Starkman whom he felt was too greedy. Likewise, Papalia came to feel a certain contempt for Perri whom he viewed as a weak boss unable to stand up to his common-law wife.

== Death ==
On August 13, 1930, Starkman was ambushed at around 11:15 p.m. as she got out of Perri's car in the garage of the couple's home. Perri ran down the street after the assailants before retreating back to Starkman who had been killed with two shotgun blasts. Police found two double-barreled shotguns and the getaway car without fingerprints. The investigation eventually resulted in no criminal charges being brought despite a $5,000 reward offered by Perri. However, it was thought that Calabrian compatriot Antonio Papalia, leader of the Papalia crime family and father of Johnny Papalia, played a role in the murder. Sergeant Frank Zaneth of the Royal Canadian Mounted Police reported to his superiors that Starkman was in debt to the gambler Arnold Rothstein, and that when Rothstein was killed in 1928, the debt had been assumed by Charles "Lucky" Luciano. Zaneth reported that agents of Stefano Magaddino who in turn was acting on behalf of "Lucky" Luciano had visited Starkman with the warning that she must pay her debts to Luciano or else die.

Perri wanted Starkman's funeral to be a lavish affair and he purchased a $3,000 coffin for her that was a copy of the one that was used to bury the actor Rudolph Valentino in 1926. On August 17, about 20,000 people lined the street for the funeral cortege of hundreds of vehicles; Perri fainted at the gravesite. The Hamilton Spectator noted: "We've never seen such a gathering of so many people". In Canada, Starkman's funeral upstaged the media coverage of the first British Empire games, which were being held in Hamilton at the time. Starkman's former husband, Harry Toben, told a reporter from the Toronto Daily Star: "Seventeen years ago she left me with two small children. She means nothing to me, and I have not seen her since she left me".

On the account of her character, no rabbi in Hamilton was willing to conduct a funeral service for her, and instead a visiting rabbi conducted the funeral for her. At the funeral, the rabbi briefly read out Psalm 121. As the rabbi said kaddish (the prayer for the dead), Perri broke down in tears and fainted. Inspector John Miller of the Ontario Provincial Police, who was assigned to investigate the murder commented that Starkman had many enemies as he noted that the Italiano, Silvestro, D'Agostino and Papalia families all hated her. Miller summarized that the killers must had been familiar with the Perri-Starkman house as the couple owned a German shepherd that barked loudly at the sight of strangers, but on the night of the murder, the dog was silent, which indicated that it knew the killers. The fact that the killers fled in a car whose stolen license plates were taken from a car parked in the auto body shop where Papalia worked led the police to view him as a suspect. Papalia told Miller when questioned: "I've got nothing to do with it. But even if I knew something, I certainly wouldn't tell you about it". Perri told the media about Papalia's possible involvement "If it were true, I wouldn't be surprised". Starkman's headstone in Hamilton's Ohev Zedek Cemetery, commissioned by Perri, referred to her as "Bessie Starkman – Perri", but the "Perri" part was later removed by persons unknown. Part of Starkman's estate went to Perri, and the rest to her children.

== In popular culture ==
- In July 2014, the first performance of a one-woman play, Bootlegger's Wife, about Starkman's life was staged at Theatre Aquarius in Hamilton. The creator and star was Victoria Murdoch; while the Perri character does not appear, "voiceovers" provide his comments. The play was staged again in mid-March 2019 and at intervals between those dates.
- Bessie Starkman appeared as a character on the CBC Television program Frankie Drake Mysteries in Season 2 (2018), portrayed by Natalie Brown, in an episode titled "Dealer's Choice". Another website states that the character runs an "illegal sports betting, and an underground casino" and is described as the "financial brains of the gang".

== Books ==
- Humphreys, Adrian (1999). The Enforcer:Johnny Pops Papalia, A Life and Death in the Mafia. Toronto, Canada: Harper Collins. ISBN 0-00-200016-4.
- Nicaso, Antonio (2004). Rocco Perri The Story of Canada's Most Notorious Bootlegger. Toronto: John Wiley & sons. ISBN 9780470835265.
