= Glenora =

Glenora can refer to:

== Places ==
- Glenora, British Columbia, also Fort Glenora, an unincorporated settlement in British Columbia, Canada
- Glenora, Ontario, a community in Ontario, Canada
- Glenora, Edmonton, a neighborhood in Edmonton, Canada
- North Glenora, Edmonton, a neighborhood in Edmonton, Canada
- Glenora, New York, a hamlet in the town of Starkey, Yates County, New York, United States
- Glenora, Tasmania, a rural locality in Australia

== Other ==
- Edmonton-Glenora, a provincial electoral district for the Legislative Assembly of Alberta, Canada
- Glenora Distillers, a distiller based in Glenville, Nova Scotia, Canada
- Glenora (ship), a vehicle ferry on Lake Ontario
