= Eden (apple) =

Apple cultivar

'Eden_SJCA38R6A74'
- Species: Malus domestica
- Origin: Quebec, Canada, 2024

Eden_SJCA38R6A74 is a firm, crisp dessert apple that does not fall from the tree at maturity and does not turn brown after cutting.

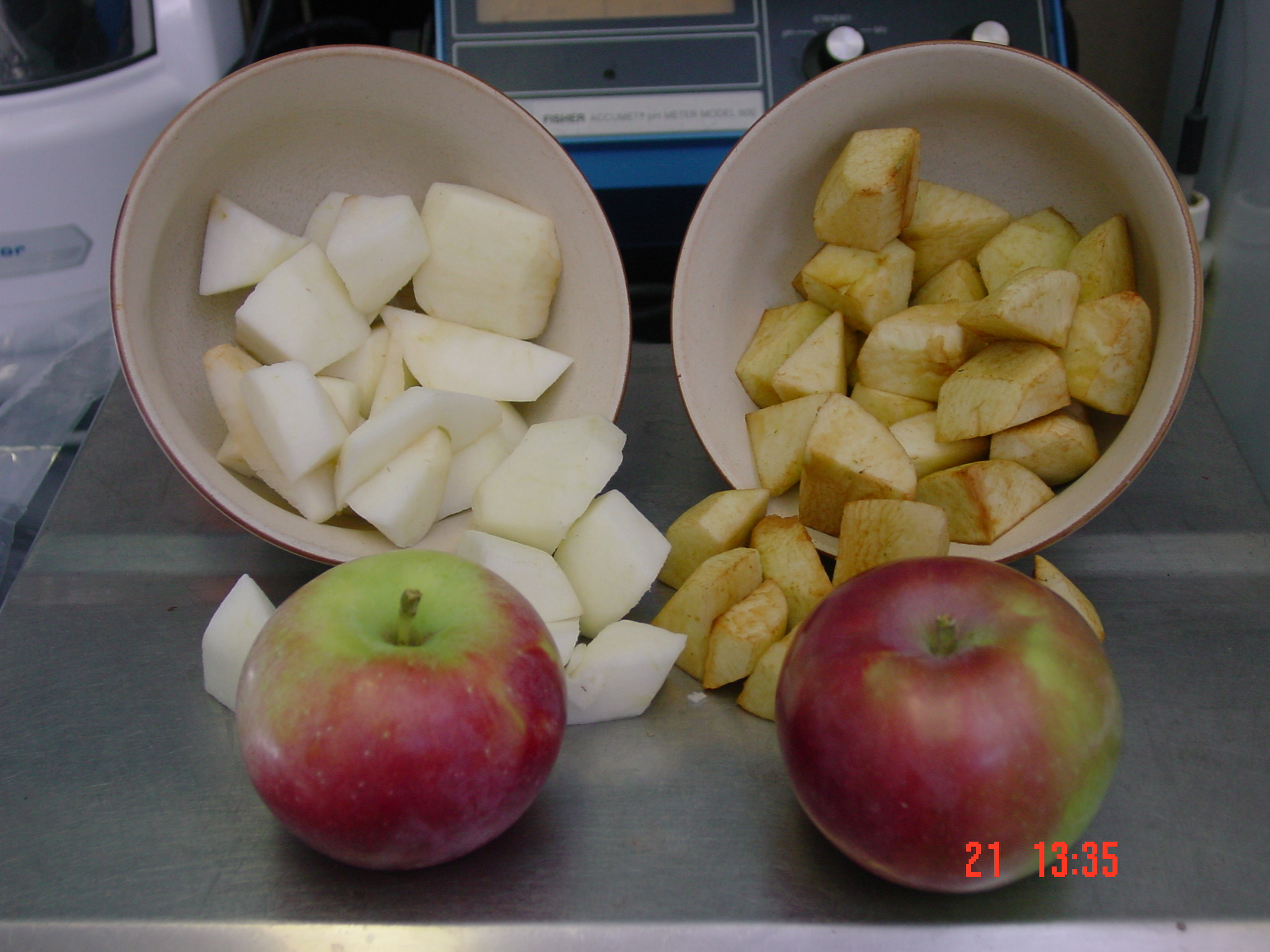
Eden vs Macspur 24 hrs after cutting

== Origin ==
Eden_SJCA38R6A74 was originated from a cross made between 'Linda' and 'Jonamac', at Agriculture and Agri-Food Canada (AAFC), Quebec, Canada.

== Characteristics ==
The trees have upright to upright-spreading shape, semi-vigorous, with wide branch angles. flowering start about a week before 'McIntosh'. Fruits are globose and medium to large in size (~150g). They are resistant to bruising and do not brown after cutting, in contrast to many other cultivars. However, they are susceptible to apple scab, similar to ‘Macspur’, ‘McIntosh’, and ‘Cortland’. The flesh is white, juicy, firm, and crisp, with a highly aromatic flavor that is well-balanced between sweetness and acidity at optimum maturity. The fruit is well suited for fresh consumption, fruit salads, and processing, including fresh-cut use and dried apple chips. It is also a strong candidate for ice cider production, as the fruit can remain on the tree after reaching maturity.

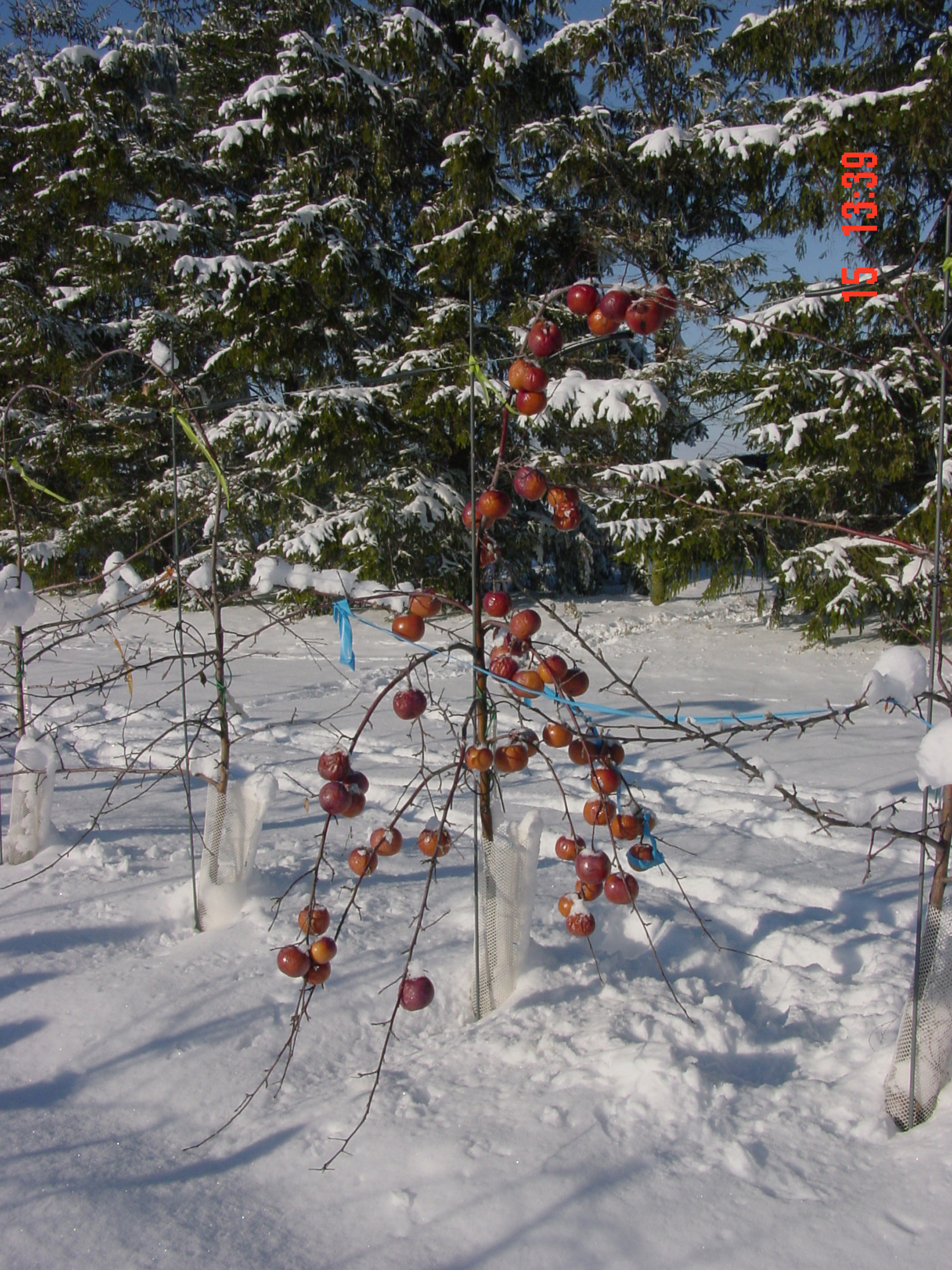
Eden tree with frozen fruit
