= Frank Zaneth =

Frank Zaneth (born Franco Zanetti; 1890–1971) was an Italian-Canadian officer of the Royal Canadian Mounted Police, noted as the first Mountie to ever go undercover in the Mafia.

== Mountie ==
Zaneth was born Franco Zanetti in the village of Gambolò in the Lombardy region of Italy, the son of a cabin maker. In 1899, his family moved to the United States in search of a better life. The Zanetti family settled in Springfield, Massachusetts, where he learned English. In 1910, Zanetti married and in 1911 he and his wife moved to Moose Jaw, Saskatchewan with the intention of buying a farm. In 1912, Zanetti purchased a farm. On 7 January 1915, Zanetti was granted British citizenship (a separate Canadian citizenship did not exist until 1947). In 1917 after his marriage ended, Zanetti applied to join the Royal Northwest Mounted Police. The journalist Trevor Cole stated about Zanetti in 1917: "Frank's wife left him, took their child. His life was a real shambles for a while. But while they were in Moosejaw, Frank had heard about the Mounties."

Upon being accepted in December 1917, he anglicized his name to Frank Zaneth. Zaneth was assigned to undercover work and his first assignment was in Quebec City following the riot that had broken out against conscription on Easter 1918. Zaneth's superiors believed that left-wing "radicals" opposed to Canada taking part in the First World War were behind the anti-conscription riots in Quebec City and had Zaneth pose as an anarchist in attempt to ferret out the "radicals". Zaneth was unable to discover the supposed conspirators behind the riot, but his undercover work resulted in several French-Canadian young men attempting to be avoid being conscripted being arrested. Zaneth was the first undercover RCMP officer and had the codename to his superiors as Operative Number 1.

In September 1918, Zaneth was assigned under the alias Harry Blask to Drumheller to investigate as an undercover officer reports that the left-wing union, the Industrial Workers of the World (whose members were known as "Wobblies") were organizing the miners in Drumheller to take part in an anti-war strike. As a miner, Zaneth earned more than he did as a policeman, but was required to turn over his wages to the RNWP. Cole stated: "Poor Frank — he had trouble with money throughout his career. He was a guy who was trying to do the right thing all the time. So he was scraping by."

In December 1918, still using his Harry Blask alias, Zaneth moved first to Canmore and then to Calgary. In Calgary, Zaneth gained the confidence of the union leader George Sangster and was able to obtain the complete membership list of the Socialist Party of Canada. In March 1919, Zaneth attended the Western Labor Conference in Calgary as a delegate. In May 1919, Zaneth went to Regina, where he gave a fiery speech calling for socialism, which led to his arrest and a week in jail. The arrest was intended to maintain the reputation of "Harry Blask" as a militant socialist. During the Winnipeg General Strike, Zaneth reported on the debates within union circles about whatever to call a general strike in Calgary. In December 1919, Zaneth's cover was ended when he was compelled to testify for the Crown at the trial of Robert B. Russell, one of the leaders of the Winnipeg general strike.

In 1920, the Royal Northwest Police was renamed as the Royal Canadian Mounted Police (RCMP). The same year, Zaneth went undercover in the United States to join the One Big Union movement. Later that year, Zaneth went to Montreal with the new alias of Jacques Leplante, a French-Canadian immigrant to the United States who had been radicalized after working in a New England textile mill who just returned to Canada. In the summer of 1920, Zaneth was identified as an undercover agent in the radical newspapers of Montreal who noted he was the same man who testified against Russell in 1919.

== Against the Mafia ==
Feeling that Zaneth was too well known in the left-wing "radical" community, he was reassigned by his superiors to infiltrate the Mafia, which he was felt to be well suited for because of his Italian origins. Zaneth was the first Mountie to ever go undercover against the Mafia. Zaneth was especially noted for his zealous pursuit of the gangster Rocco Perri of Hamilton, Ontario. Zaneth was a pioneer in investigating money laundering, which was a novel concept in the RCMP in the 1920s. Zaneth's investigation of money laundering and bootlegging took him abroad several times as he went undercover to Chicago, the French islands of Saint Pierre and Miquelon, and the Dominion of Newfoundland.

In 1926, Zaneth was transferred from Montreal to Toronto, where he began his pursuit of Perri, which he called "the Great Hunt". The journalist Antonio Nicaso wrote: "Zaneth, tenacious to the point of being obstinate, understood that the only way to trap Perri was to infiltrate his gang". Zaneth recruited a Toronto criminal, Ernest Tomlinson, who had a criminal record for living off the avails of prostitution and theft, to serve as a his contract with the Toronto underworld. Zaneth under the cover of a drug dealer from Montreal was introduced by Tomlinson to various drug dealers in disputable bars in Toronto.

In 1929, Zaneth went undercover again to infiltrate the Perri-Starkman gang led by Rocco Perri and his common-law wife Bessie Starkman. Posing as a drug dealer from Montreal, Zaneth arrived in Toronto saying he wanted to buy cocaine, heroin and morphine. In Toronto, Zaneth met two members of the Perri-Starkman gang, Tony Defalco and Antonio Brasi. Brasi and Defalco agreed to Zaneth some $40 worth of morphine. On 8 May 1929, another member of the Perri-Starkman gang, Tony Roma arrived at Zaneth's hotel room to hand him 100 white cubes of morphine, all of which weighed between 2 and 2.5 grams. Having gained their trust, Zaneth purchased cocaine, heroin and morphine from Brasi and Defalco three more times in May–June 1929. Zaneth noted that the drugs were always wrapped up in newspapers from Hamilton, which led him to deduce that was the source of the drugs. His suspicions were confirmed when Brasi and Defalco told him that Francesco Rossi of Hamilton, a.k.a. "Frank Ross", was the main distributor of cocaine and morphine in Ontario.

Zaneth reported on 15 June 1929: "...on the 14th instant whilst in Hamilton in connection with another investigation, an Italian whom I have known for some time and who was connected with the Mutual Steamship Agencies, approached me and informed me that Rocco Peri was the big gun in the smuggling and distribution of narcotic drugs in this province. During the conversation, he also mentioned one Frank Ross, residing at 255 Barton St. West, as being the first lieutenant of Rocco Perri, and the distribution of drugs rests with him. I was also advised that Rocco Peri runs a garage at 108 Merrick Street, Hamilton, but the place is used as a blind more than anything else. I may also point that Frank Ross drives very expensive cars, never works and the lives the life of a millionaire".

Having arrived in Hamilton, Zaneth learned that the main storehouse for the drugs was the house of Nazzareno "Ned" Italiano. Zaneth observed that Perri and Starkman visited Italiano several times, but never observed them engaging in any illegal activities. On 29 June 1929, Zaneth ordered Italiano arrested, whom he suspected of being the man who sold cocaine and morphine to De Falco and Roma who "both came from the same area of Calabria as Rocco Perri".

On 30 June 1929, the RCMP raided an illegal gambling house in Toronto owned and operated by Roma. Both Roma and Zaneth were arrested in the raid. On the same day, the RCMP raided Italiano's Hamilton house. The Mounties found cocaine and morphine worth $3,500 in Italiano's house along with a large quantity of cash. As the Mounties were escorting Italiano down the stairs of his house after having arrested him, Starkman arrived at the house. The Mounties searched her and found that she had hundreds of dollars with her. Lacking any probable cause to arrest her, Starkman was allowed to leave.

In another attempt to capture Perri, Zaneth recruited a drug dealer, James Curwood, as his contact. Zaneth adopted a new disguise and alias, namely as Arthur Anderson, a gangster from Chicago who wanted to buy drugs for George "Bugs" Moran, the boss of Chicago's North Side Gang. However, the attempt failed as Perri would not sell drugs to members of the North Side Gang, who were the rivals to the Chicago Outfit led by Al Capone. In another attempt, Zaneth lobbied his superiors to buy him a McLaughlin-Buick (an extremely expensive car in 1929), and again he posed as a drug dealer to James Harris, another member of the Perri-Starkman gang. Through Harris, Zaneth was finally able to meet Starkman. Starkman stated she needed more time to research Zaneth's background before selling him any drugs. Zanath reported on 25 September 1929: "There is no doubt this is the cleverest gang of drug runners in the country and when the liquor racket was exhausted they turned to the narcotic drugs. I may also say that Mrs. Perri [Starkman] is the brains of the whole gang and nothing is being done without her consent". Of his meeting with Starkman, he wrote: "During the conversation I made every effort to press the issue but they informed me that their connections had been lost; that their New York man had flown the coop and that they were not in a position to say when they could resume negotiations with me". He named as the leaders of the gang as Perri, Starkman, Frank Ross, Tony Ross, Frank D'Agostino and Frank Romeo and that the main center of drug distribution in Ontario was the tiny village of Beaverboard near Thorold. Zaneth's cover was blown when he had to testify as a witness for the Crown against the gangsters arrested in June.

On 23 September 1929, the trial of Italiano, Defalco and Brasi for narcotics trafficking began and Zaneth was the star witness for the Crown. On 27 September 1929, all of the accused were convicted. It was hoped by the Crown that the accused would turn Crown's evidence in exchange for testifying against Perri and Starkman, but the trio stayed faithful to Omertà. Roma was also charged with narcotics trafficking, but he jumped bail and fled Canada before the trial began. On 27 July 1936, Roma was arrested by the Federal Bureau of Investigation in Fowler, California and was extradited back to Canada, where he was convicted on 21 December 1936 on narcotics trafficking. Despite the setback, Zaneth continued his pursuit of Perri by recruiting a construction worker named Licastro to go undercover for him. Licastro reported to Zaneth: "Joseph Serianni, the boss of Niagara Falls, is the man who takes care of the drugs on arrival from New York. And Tony Roma was one of the chief agents on this side of the line but...Rocco Perri is the actual man behind the scenes".

Zaneth possessed much information about the Perri-Starkman gang, but not enough to bring about a conviction in court. Nicaso wrote that Zaneth was "one of the most talented investigators" in the history of the Mounties, but he was not able to assemble enough evidence to bring charges. However, Zaneth was aware that Roma had was still involved in drug smuggling from the Los Angeles area. Zaneth reported that a woman in Thorold had heard Roma's wife, Ethel Groves, say to him "What a fine friend [Perri] turned out to be. After he asked you to stop doing business with Jimmy [Frank D'Agostino] and buying from him, in a time of trouble he refused to help you". In pursuit of this line of inquiry, Zaneth discovered that Perri gang had engaged in human trafficking by bringing in illegal immigrants from Italy to Canada to be exploited. One member of the gang, Flavio Masi, fled back to Italy, but was arrested and extradited after Zaneth discovered where he had fled to. Paul Clement, a secretary with the Italian consulate in Toronto was accused of being part of the ring along with a Liberal MP, a number of officials in the Department of Immigration, and the board of directors of two mutual aid societies for Italian immigrants.

== Assistant Commissioner ==
In 1938 as an assistant commissioner of the RCMP, Zaneth prepared the case against the leaders of the Communist Party of Canada for violations of the Foreign Enlistment Act as the Communists had sought to recruit young men of left-wing views to fight in the International Brigades on the Republican side in the Spanish Civil War. In 1937, the government of William Lyon Mackenzie King had passed the Foreign Enlistment Act to expressly stop Canadians from volunteering for the International Brigades following a lobbying campaign by the Roman Catholic Church, which supported the Spanish Nationalists against the "godless" Spanish Republic.

The intention of the RCMP was to indict the entire leadership of the Communist Party, and Zaneth had meticulously prepared the case that the Communist Party of Canada as an institution had been recruiting for the Mackenzie–Papineau Battalion of the International Brigades. Following the expected convictions of the Communist leaders, the government planned to ban the Communist Party of Canada. Shortly before the planned arrests, the government decided not to go ahead with the operation out of the fear of the public reaction.

In 1951, Zaneth retired from the RCMP. When Stuart Taylor retired as the Chief Commissioner of the RCMP, Zaneth was widely regarded as the logical successor because as Nicaso put it he was "the natural choice, given his charisma and ability". However, it was felt that the Italian immigrant Zaneth was an inappropriate choice to be the chief commissioner and instead Leonard Hanson-Nicholson was appointed the chief commissioner. Zaneth took a six month vacation and then promptly retired in late 1951. In 1971, when Zaneth died, his funeral attracted no media attention.
