= Domaine Pinnacle =

Domaine Pinnacle is a family-owned orchard, cidery, and maple-grove located near the village of Frelighsburg in the Eastern Townships of Quebec, Canada.

Founded in 2000 by Charles Crawford and Susan Reid as a cidery, the company distributes its products internationally. Its ciders have received awards in various competitions.

In 2016, the company sold its spirits division to Corby Spirit and Wine. That same year, its cider operations were consolidated into CidreCo, a newly established venture.

== Location ==
The estate is situated near Mount Pinnacle in Frelighsburg, Quebec, and includes century-old apple orchards and a farmhouse constructed in 1859. The farmhouse features an octagonal rooftop lookout turret, which historically served as an observation point for monitoring the nearby Vermont border. According to local accounts, the building may have functioned as a stop on the Underground Railroad during its early years. Later, during the Prohibition Era, the site reportedly became a gathering place for bootleggers.

The property also houses a commercial facility operated by Domaine Pinnacle, which is open to the public. The facility offers product tastings, self-guided tours, and an interpretation center detailing the history and production methods associated with the estate. The estate produces ice ciders and hard ciders.

== See also ==
- Ice Cider
- Cream Liqueur
