= Corbyville =

Community in Ontario, Canada

Coordinates: 44°13′N 77°22′W

Corbyville is a community located within the City of Belleville, Ontario. Its origins begin when Henry Corby immigrated to Canada. Corby had been a baker in England and when he arrived in Belleville in 1832, he set up a small food shop. After serving in the Rebellion of 1837 he bought a Saint Lawrence steamer named the Queen which he operated for four years.

It was customary for farmers to set aside a portion of their inferior grain to be made into whisky, and as Corby was already making whisky for the locals, he became interested in the distilling process. In 1857, Corby built a dam and established a grist-mill on the bank of the Moira River. In 1859 he built a distillery which became more important than the mill.

Ten years after building his first mill, Henry decided to try his hand at politics and was elected mayor in 1867. The following year he served as a member of the Provincial Parliament for the Conservatives.

Henry died on October 25, 1881, at which time his son, Harry, took over the business. Harry began to sell the whisky by the bottle rather than the barrel, seeing it a better business opportunity. In 1905 the company was named the H. Corby Distillery. The distillery was closed in 1989.

== Present day ==
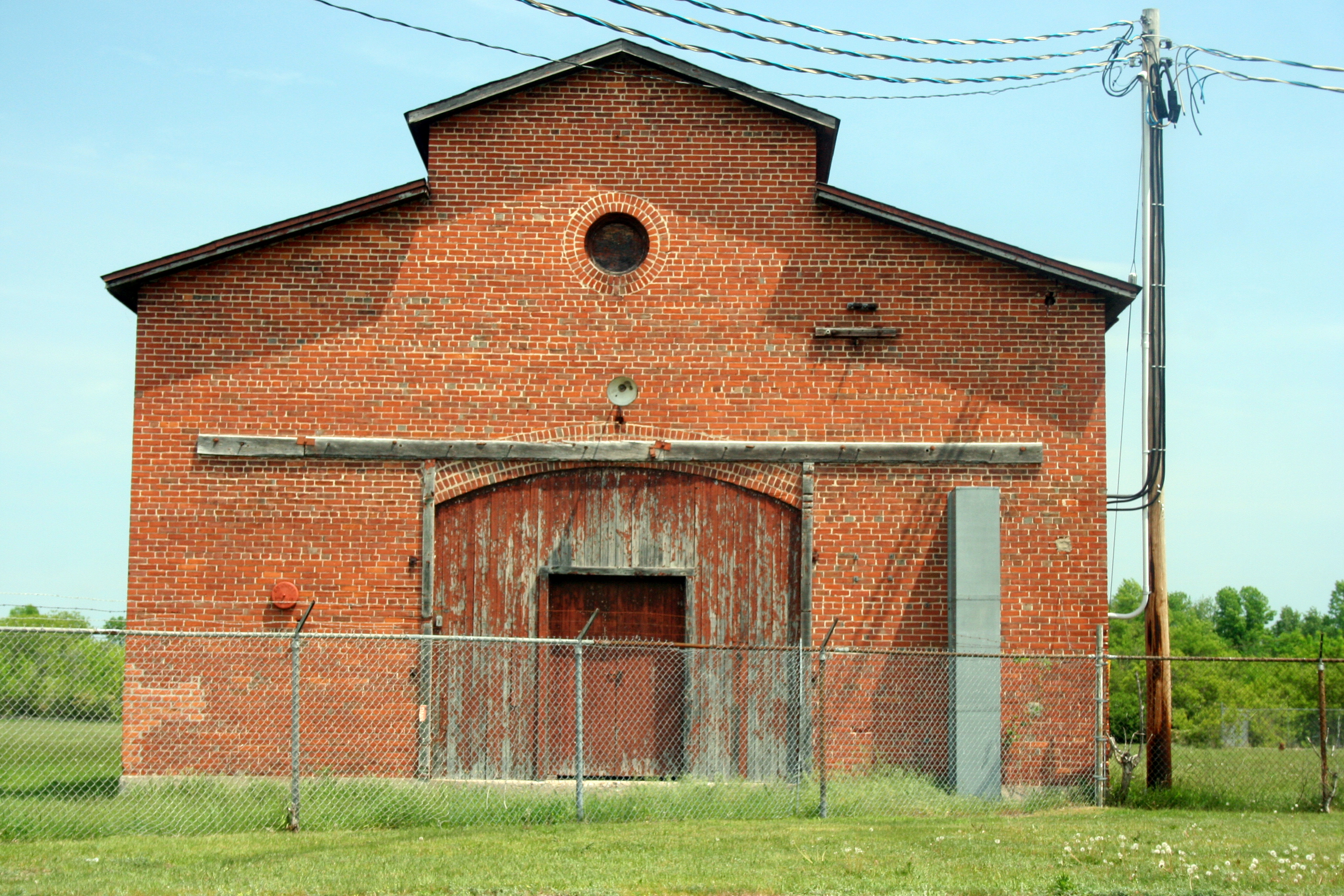
Remnants of the distillery

The hamlet of Corbyville has over 700 households, with many people commuting within the expanded City of Belleville. Corbyville has an elementary school, Harmony Public School, but no high school so teenage students are generally bussed to Eastside High School in Belleville.

On Sunday April 5, 2009, most of what remained of the old Corby Distillery burned down. Arson was suspected.

== Wildlife ==
Because of its rural location and proximity to woodlands, there is an abundance of wildlife in Corbyville. Wildlife sightings include deer, black bear, raccoons, porcupine, squirrels, fox, rabbits, muskrats, groundhogs and coyotes. There is a wide variety of birds found here including wild turkeys, American woodcocks, pileated woodpeckers, great blue herons, Canada geese and kingfishers. The Moira River, which runs through part of Corbyville, is home to many different species of animals including snapping turtles, crayfish and garter snakes.
