= Polar Ice (vodka) =

Canadian vodka brand

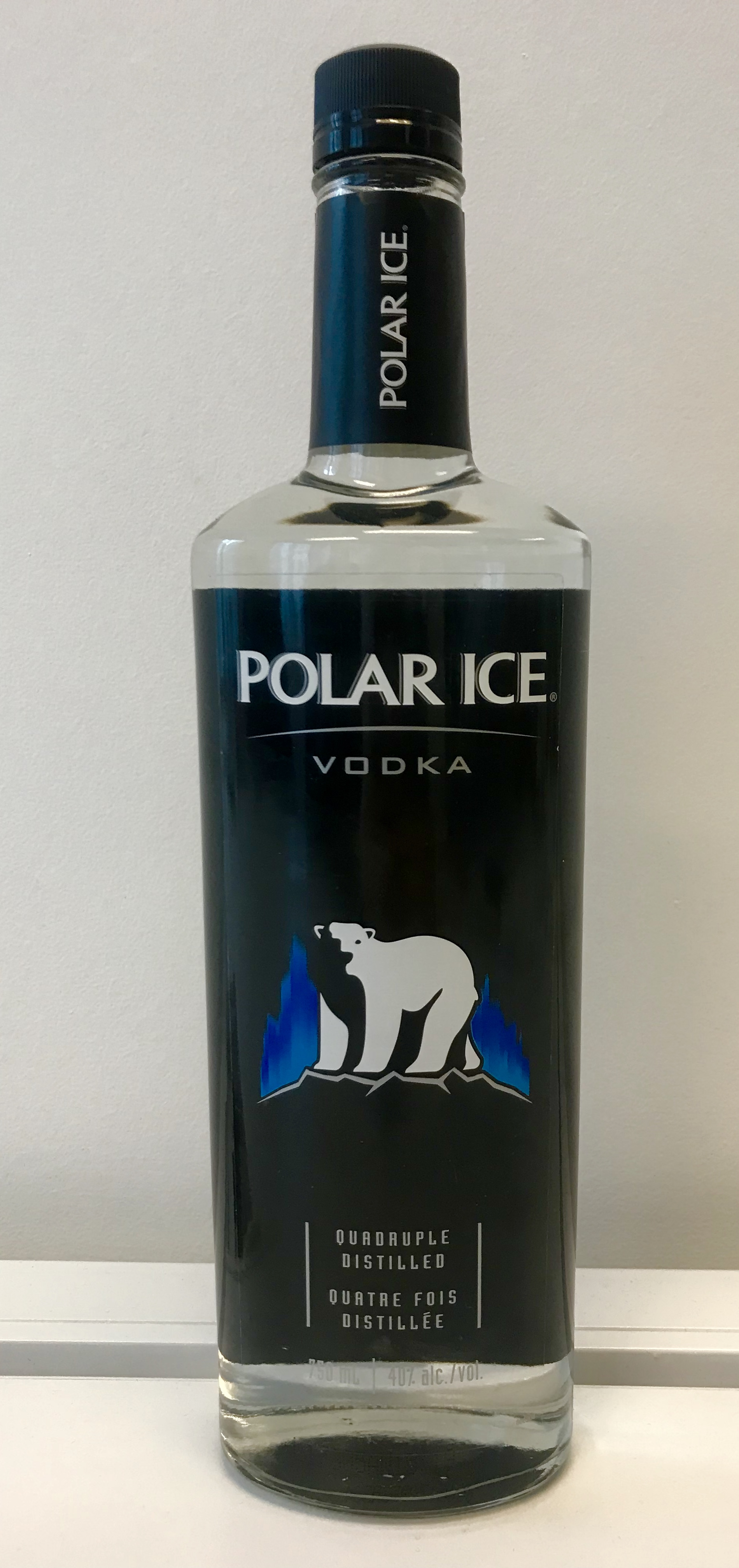
- Polar Ice Vodka Bottle 750ml
- Type: Vodka
- Manufacturer: Corby Distilleries Limited
- Origin: Canada
- Introduced: ca. 1984
- Alcohol by volume: 40%
- Proof (US): 80
- Related products: List of vodkas
- Website: www.polarice.ca

Polar Ice is a Canadian vodka produced by Corby Distilleries Ltd. Produced from Canadian corn, it is quadruple-distilled, which vendors claim rids it of microscopic impurities and gives it a smoother taste. It is an 80 proof spirit. The product line includes various sizes and bottles (plastic and glass) of Polar Ice Vodka (40% alc./vol), Polar Ice Vodka Arctic Extreme (45% alc./vol) and Polar Ice Vodka Ontario Peach. It is sold across Canada and in some cities in the United States of America.

== Awards ==
San Francisco World Spirits Competition

2015: Gold Medal - Polar Ice Vodka
2017: Double Gold Metal - Polar Ice 90 North Vodka Silver Medal - Polar Ice Vodka
2018: Double Gold Medal - Polar Ice Arctic Extreme Vodka
2019: Double Gold Medal - Polar Ice Arctic Extreme Vodka

International Wine & Spirit Competition

2017: Silver – Polar Ice Vodka Silver Outstanding - Polar Ice 90 North Vodka
2018: Silver Outstanding - Polar Ice Arctic Extreme Vodka Silver - Flavored Vodka - Polar Ice Ontario Peach Vodka Silver - Polar Ice Vodka

International Spirits Challenge

2017: Silver- Polar Ice 90 North
2018: Silver - Polar Ice Vodka

SIP Awards

2017: Platinum - Polar Ice 90* North Silver - Polar Ice
2018: Consumer Choice Award – Polar Ice Vodka Silver - Polar Ice Vodka Gold - Polar Ice Arctic Extreme

The Spirit Business: Global Vodka Masters

2017: Master - Polar Ice 90° North Gold - Polar Ice Vodka
2018: Silver - Polar Ice Vodka Gold - Polar Ice Arctic Extreme Gold – Polar Ice Peach
