= J.P. Wiser's Whisky =

Canadian whisky

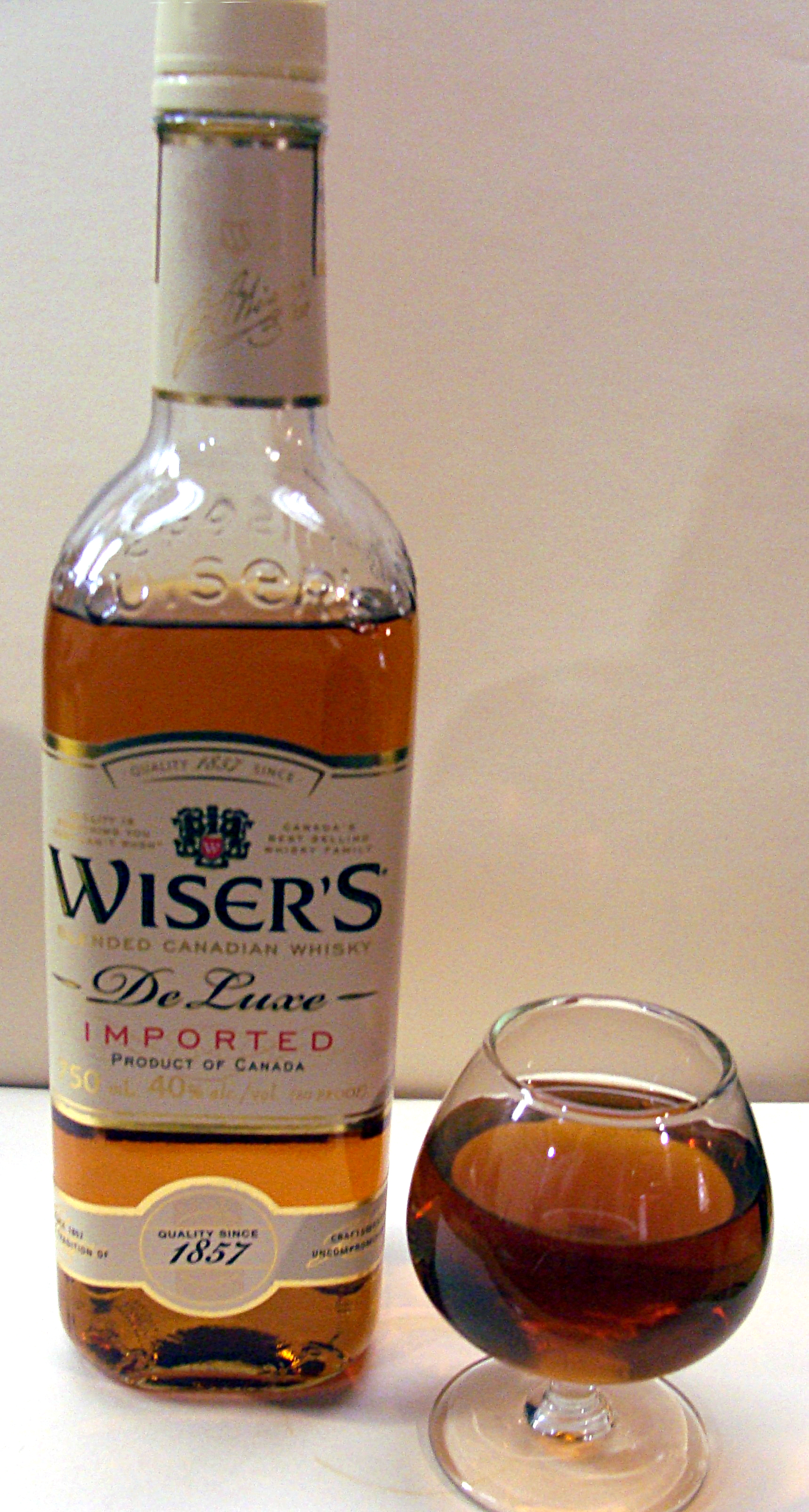
- A bottle of J.P. Wiser's De Luxe, the flagship brand
- Type: Canadian whisky
- Manufacturer: Corby Spirit and Wine (Pernod Ricard)
- Origin: Windsor, Ontario, Canada
- Alcohol by volume: 40.00%
- Proof (US): 80

J.P. Wiser's Whisky is a Canadian whisky producer and one of the oldest in the country, established in 1857. Since 1935, it has held a majority stake in Corby Spirit and Wine. In 2005 the international Liquor company Pernod Ricard took ownership of both companies. Hiram Walker & Sons Limited currently produce J.P. Wiser's Whisky at their Windsor, Ontario, distillery.

== Early history ==
John Philip (J.P.) Wiser was born in 1825 in New York, to Isaac J. Wiser and Mary Egert. In 1857, Wiser began running the Charles Payne Distillery and Farm in Prescott, Ontario, which was owned by his uncle, Charles Egert, and his uncle's business partner, Amos Averell.

Five years after starting as manager of the distillery, Wiser bought out Egert and Averell to become its sole owner. At the time, the distillery produced 116,500 gallons of whisky a year. Wiser introduced his first bottles of whisky at the Chicago World's Fair of 1893. By the time of the U.S. Civil War, J.P. Wiser's Red Letter Rye was sold in Canada, and J.P. Wiser's Canadian Whisky became available for export. Wiser's son, Harlow, operated the distillery to an output of 500,000 gallons a year until he died at the age of 36 from a heart attack in 1895.

By the early 1900s, J.P. Wiser was exporting whisky around the world, and his distillery in Prescott became the third largest in Canada behind Hiram Walker's in Windsor and Gooderham & Worts' in Toronto. When Wiser died in 1911, Albert Whitney, a treasurer who had worked at the distillery for more than 50 years, took over ownership of the company.

The company struggled after the death of J.P Wiser, and at the end of World War I, J.P. Wiser's was sold and merged with Corby, J.M. Douglas and Company Limited and Robert MacNish and Co. Limited of Scotland. In 1935, the company merged with Hiram Walker.

== Recent history ==
Newest Label Launches

Wiser's Spiced was launched in fall 2012. Wiser's Small Batch was also launched to replace Wiser's Reserve, with upgraded packaging and advertising. In September 2013, Wiser's Red Letter was re-introduced to celebrate J.P. Wiser's 150th anniversary.

J.P. Wiser's in the U.S.

J.P. Wiser's Rye and J.P. Wiser's Spiced whisky were introduced to the U.S. market in October 2013.

== Advertising slogan ==
In summer of 2022, J.P. Wiser's website read: "To the people and moments that matter."

The J.P. Wiser's brand is advertised with a quote from J.P. Wiser, saying "Quality is something you just can't rush. Horses should hurry, but whisky must take its time."

== Wiserhood marketing campaign ==
In 2008, Wiser's introduced the "Wiserhood" campaign created by John St. advertising from Toronto. The campaign focuses on The Wiserhood, the "Society of Uncompromising Men", represented by a group of dapper men who recognize a small victory for men everywhere.

The campaign resumed in 2010, introducing a "Slow Clap App" and more TV spots. After three years, the Wiserhood took a hiatus.

In 2013, Wiser's launched a modified version of the campaign with social media components. "Wiser's Wants You!" is a Facebook-hosted contest that encouraged entrants to audition for a role in a Wiserhood TV spot.

An article published by The Globe and Mail on April 7, 2011, described a back-and-forth between Michael Bliss (Order of Canada, Royal Society of Canada) and Corby Spirit & Wine president, Patrick O'Driscoll. Allegedly, Bliss said a Wiserhood commercial (in which a bored man on a date at an art gallery begins touching fine art in order to get kicked out of the gallery) was tasteless and suggested it contravened the Canadian Code of Advertising Standards by encouraging the desecration of art. O'Driscoll replied it was intended to be humorous and outlined Corby's support of Canada's artistic community.

== Distillery ==
Hiram Walker & Sons Distillery

Since the 1980s, J.P. Wiser's Whisky has been distilled and bottled at the Hiram-Walker & Sons distillery in Windsor, Ontario and aged in the Pike Creek area of Lakeshore. Hiram Walker & Sons has the largest distillery capacity in North America with 39 fermenters, producing approximately 55 million litres of absolute alcohol and 60 - 70% of all Canadian whisky. About 75% of this whisky is sold to independent bottlers in Canada and abroad.

The manufacturing process distills 180,000 litres of alcohol every 24 hours and operates 24 hours a day, five days a week and every second weekend to produce a variety of alcohol products. In a year, the facilities handle more than five million cases of spirits. Hiram Walker & Sons holds 1.6 million barrels of spirits in their maturing warehouse, which are blended and eventually bottled on four high-speed lines. The distillery is the only "grain to glass" distillery in Ontario, with over 50 bottle molds available.

In recent years, the distillery has launched environmental initiatives, including reducing the amount of water diverted to waste by 60%, reducing wastewater contaminant by 90% and reducing overall energy consumption by 40%.

== Labels ==
- J.P. Wiser's Deluxe – Wiser's signature blend. Oak, toasted grains and toffee flavours. Five to nine-year-old whiskies in blend. 40% abv.
- J.P. Wiser's Spiced – 100% corn grain. Canadian spiced whisky with a hint of vanilla. 43% abv.
- Wiser's Special Blend – Number one economy whisky in Canada. Fresh wood, spice and vanilla flavours. Three-year-old whiskies in blend. 40% abv.
- Wiser's Small Batch – Canadian whisky using traditional methods. Rich oak, vanilla and spice flavours. 43.4% abv.
- J.P. Wiser's Rye – Developed from the Canadian whisky mash recipe used in 1869. Caramel, honeycomb toffee, vanilla, dried fruits, rye spices, green apple and pear drops flavours. 40% abv.
- J.P. Wiser's 18 Years Old – Blended Canadian whisky aged for minimum 18 years. Mature oak, baked apples, spice, caramel, fresh pine and autumn floral flavours. 40% abv.
- J.P. Wiser's Legacy – Most whiskies in blend are aged 10 years. 33% of the blend is Lot 40. Rich oak, apple, toffee, vanilla, spice and red apple flavours. 45% abv.
- J.P. Wiser's Red Letter – Tribute whisky to J.P. Wiser's 150th anniversary. Aged 10 or more years. Oak, vanilla, toffee, wood spice and dried fruits flavours. 45% abv.

== Production ==
Canada's Food and Drugs Act requires whisky labeled as "Canadian Whisky" be mashed, distilled and aged three years in wooden casks of less than 700 L. Due to the openness of this definition, a Master Blender is free to be innovative in comparison to other whiskies around the world. Today, J.P. Wiser's follows a process similar in tradition to that established from J.P. Wiser's original whiskies:

1. Wiser's production begins with grains sourced from the Great Lakes Region.
2. Using malt purchased from a supplier, J.P. Wiser's cooks, ferments, distills and ages all grains—corn, rye, barley and wheat—separately in a variety of casks, including virgin oak or once-used American Bourbon casks, used wine casks or multiple-used Canadian whisky casks. J.P. Wiser's then blends the components at the end using recipes created by the Master Blender. Canadian whisky is a blended product.
3. Flours are combined and mixed into a pre-mix tank along with cold water, back stillage and nitrogen to make the mash.
4. Mash is cooked at 72 °C or higher using steam to release enzymes that break the starch down into sugar units. Enzymes from the malt help convert the starch to sugar.
5. Using a non-contact method that utilizes plates, mash is cooled with non-contact water from the Great Lakes Watershed to a fermentation temperature of 32 °C — the optimum temperature for yeast.
6. Yeast is added, which converts sugar into equal parts alcohol and carbon dioxide.
7. Mash enters the top of the distillation column and flavor compounds are separated by boiling points to create high wines. High wines can be further distilled using the pot still (batch process) for concentrated flavors, or double distilled in a column still to strip out flavors and create a base whisky.
8. J.P. Wiser's uses white oak American Bourbon, once-used AB casks, or port casks, wine casks or multiple-used casks (depending on the recipe) that have been charred on the inside to age whisky for a minimum of three years. The temperature extremes of the Great Lakes Region have a unique effect on the aging of Canadian whiskies not found anywhere else in the world.
9. Depending on the desired whisky, the solution may be filtered chilled, non-chilled or remain unfiltered.

== Master Blender: Dr. Don Livermore ==
Dr. Don Livermore has been the J.P. Wiser's Master Blender since early 2012. He took over from his mentor, former Master Blender David Doyle—with whom he helped influence the J.P. Wiser's Legacy label. After beginning his career with Hiram Walker and Sons Ltd. as a microbiologist in quality assurance, Livermore worked in research and product development for 11 years. He obtained his BSc in microbiology at the University of Waterloo and earned a MSc and a PhD in Brewing and Distilling at Heriot-Watt University.

== Popular culture ==
Wiser's has used actors in their Wiserhood campaign who have gone on to become celebrities in other roles, including Canadian comedian Gerry Dee (Mr. D, Last Comic Standing, Just For Laughs) and English actor Charles Dance (HBO's Game of Thrones, The Last Action Hero, Alien 3).
