= Lamb's =

Caribbean rum

Lamb's Navy Rum is a sugar-cane based Caribbean rum popular in the UK and Canada.

In 1849, 22-year-old Londoner Alfred Lamb, son of wine and spirits merchant William Lamb, blended 18 different rums from Barbados, Guyana, Jamaica and Trinidad to produce Lamb's Navy Rum. His company took the name Alfred Lamb & Son.

The use of the term "navy rum" dates back to the Royal Navy issuing a daily ration of rum to its sailors. It had previously given its sailors French brandy, but the 1655 conquest of Jamaica gave it access to rum, which it quickly exploited. Lamb's was never an official supplier to the Royal Navy. The 1970 decision of the British Royal Navy to end issuing daily rum rations to its sailors inspired the brand that year to adopt the advertising campaign, "Join the Lamb’s Navy."

Alfred Lamb & Son was bombed out of its London premises on Great Tower Street in World War II. Its competitor, White Keeling Rum Merchants, was bombed out of its premises, too. Portal, Dingwall & Norris took them both into its premises at 40 Eastcheap, London, inspiring the three companies to merge in 1946 to form United Rum Merchants.

In 1952, Canadian company Corby Distilleries signed an agreement with United Rum Merchants to bottle the brand under licence in Canada.

Lamb's became part of the Allied Lyons portfolio in 1984, which itself was acquired (as Allied Domecq) in 2005 by French drinks giant Pernod Ricard. As part of the deal, Pernod Ricard had to sell off some brands, and Lamb's was acquired by Corby, which became an affiliate of Pernod Ricard by virtue of the Allied Domecq purchase.

Corby Distilleries bottles Lamb's in Canada for the North American markets. Outside North America, it is also bottled by Halewood International in England, which distributes it in Europe, Africa and Asia.

In 2009, Halewood International launched a spiced version aimed at international markets. This failed to meet sales expectations, so it was reformulated in 2014.
