= Glenora Distillers =

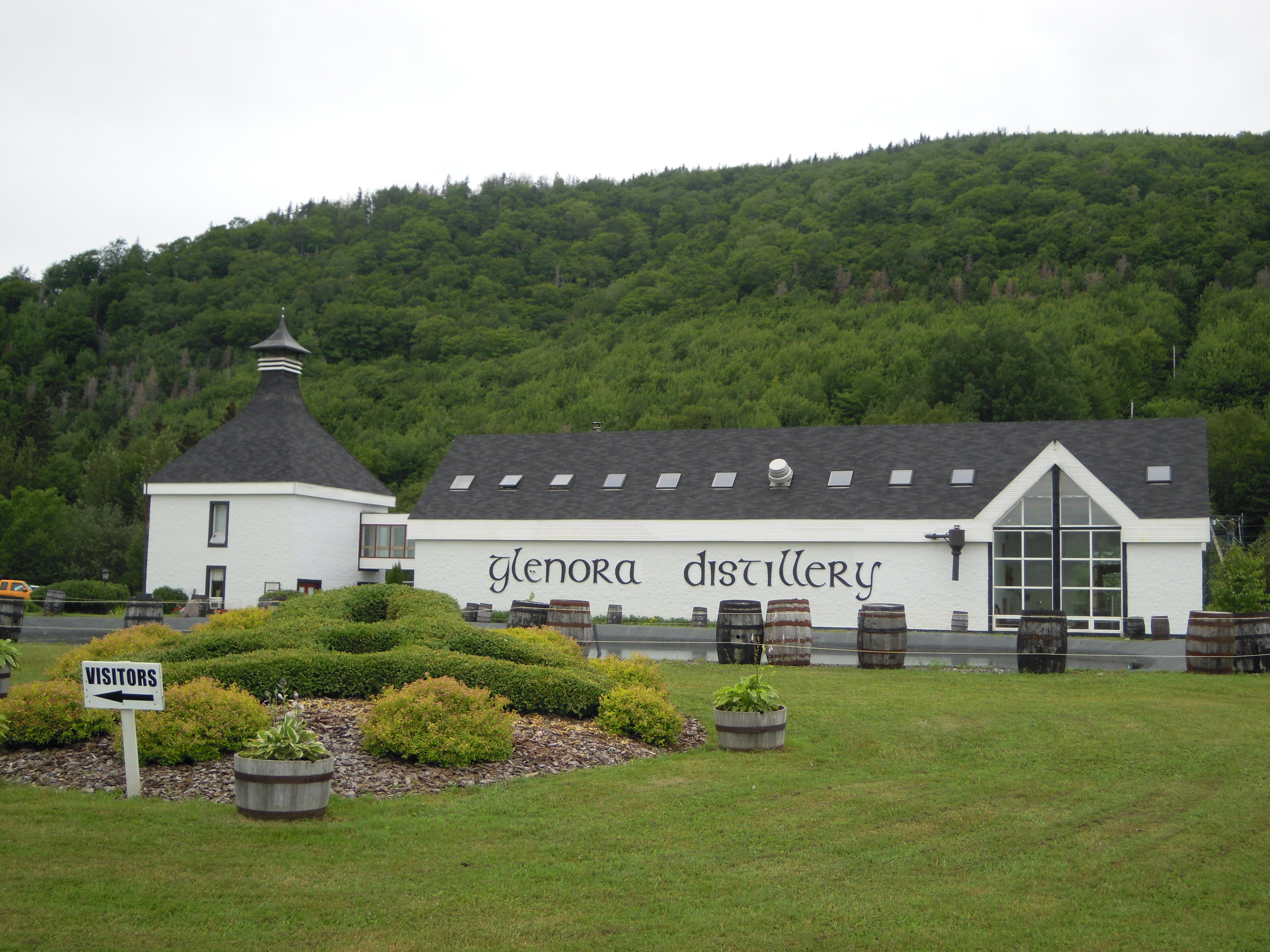
- The Glenora Distillery
- Founded: 1989
- Founder: Bruce Jardine
- Website: http://www.glenoradistillery.com/

Glen Breton Rare
- Type: Single Malt
- Age(s): 10, 14, 19 or 21
- Cask type(s): American oak

Glen Breton Rare Ice
- Type: Single Malt
- Age(s): 10, 15 or 17
- Cask type(s): Oak casks used for ice wine

Glenora Distillers is a distiller based in Glenville, Nova Scotia, Canada, on Cape Breton Island. Their most prominent product is Glen Breton Rare whisky, made in the Scottish-style in that it is a single malt Canadian whisky, not a rye, as is traditional in Canada. The distillery also makes several specialty whiskies and rum, and operates the Glenora Inn & Distillery as a tourist attraction and bed and breakfast.

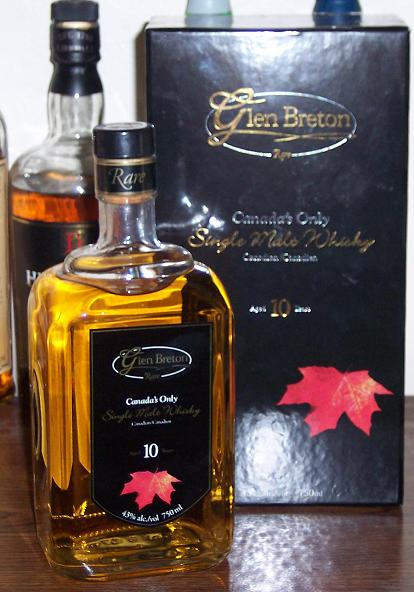
Glen Breton Rare with Collector's Case

== Brands ==
=== Glen Breton single malts ===
Glen Breton Rare is the signature whisky brand of Glenora Distillers. The 10-year-old whisky is aged in American oak casks. It was featured in the book, 101 Whiskies to Try Before You Die. In November 2000, an 8-year-old version of the Glen Breton Rare was released. By 2018, it offered a wide range of whiskies up to 25 years old.

=== Glen Breton Rare Ice ===
Glenora Distillery produces a single malt whisky aged in oak barrels used for Jost Vineyard's Ortega Ice Wine. The Glen Breton Rare Ice is available in 10, 15 and 17-year-old versions.

== Litigation ==
The "Glen Breton" name was put into question before it had ever sold a bottle. The Scotch Whisky Association (SWA), an organization representing 57 different Scotch whisky companies from Scotland, claimed that the whisky was misleading potential international buyers by using the term “Glen” in its name — a term used almost exclusively on Scotch whisky labels. The trademark name "Scotch" does not appear on the bottle anywhere, and the label states it is a product of Canada and clearly displays a red maple leaf.

On January 24, 2007, CBC News reported that the Canadian Trademarks Opposition Board, an arm of the Canadian Intellectual Property Office rejected the arguments of the Scotch Whisky Association, clearing the way for the distillery to continue to use the Glen Breton Rare label. The SWA responded that the ruling was inconsistent with international case law, and that it would file an appeal.

On April 3, 2008, the Federal Court of Canada ruled in favour of the SWA's demand that the word Glen be dropped from the product's name. On December 18, 2008, Glenora Distillers appealed to the Federal Court of Appeal in Ottawa and on January 22, 2009, the court overturned the lower court's ruling.

An application for leave to appeal to the Supreme Court of Canada, filed by SWA on March 23, 2009, was dismissed with costs on June 11, 2009.

In June 2010, a 15-year-old version of the Glen Breton single malt whisky was released. It was named "Battle of the Glen", commemorating the distillery's legal battle over the use of the word "glen".

== See also ==
- Canadian whisky
- Whisky
- Distilled beverage
