= Ice cider =

Fermented beverage made from the juice of frozen apples

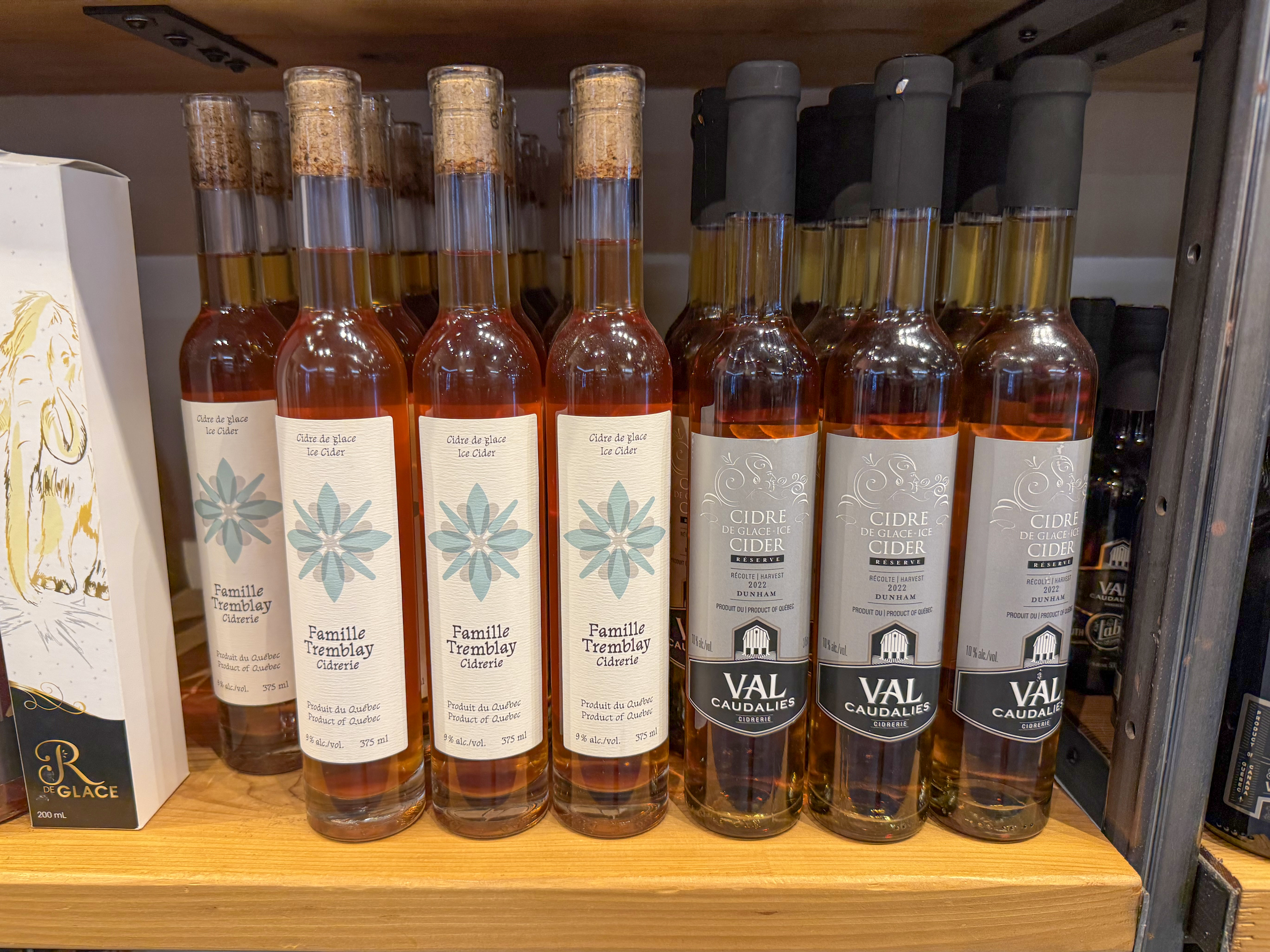
Ice cider from Quebec

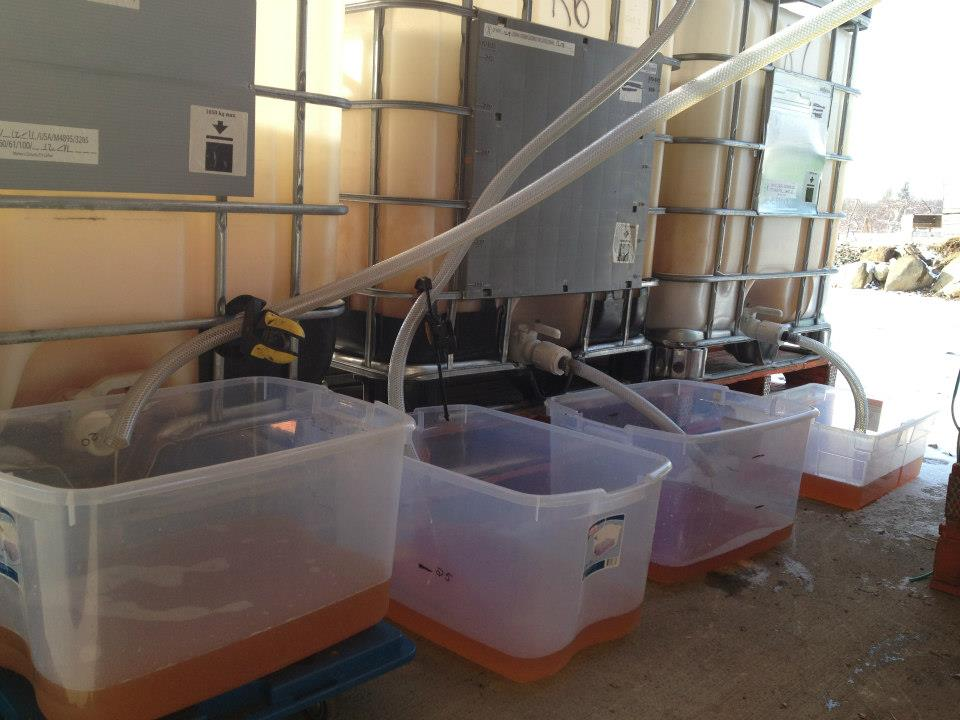
Apple juice fermenting into ice cider through cryoconcentration

Ice cider (also known as apple icewine or cidre de glace in French; sold as ice apple wine in the United States) is the cider equivalent of ice wine: a fermented beverage made from the juice of frozen apples. Similar to ice wine, the use of frozen apples concentrates the natural sugars in the apples, resulting in a higher alcohol content than cider made by traditional methods.

Ice cider was originally created in Quebec, made possible by the region's naturally cold temperatures. It is now also produced in other regions where the climate reaches freezing temperatures and is suitable for apples.

== History ==
Ice cider was first created in Quebec when Christian Barthomeuf, a winemaker from Dunham, considered the "father of ice cider", created a recipe in 1989 inspired by the ice wines of Germany. Quebec's climate is much more suited to growing apples than grapes, and the same techniques can be applied to both fruits. In 1994, at Hemmingford in Montérégie, Barthomeuf worked with Francois Pouliot to refine and develop ice cider in much larger volumes, at the cidery La Face Cachée de la Pomme.

The first bottle sold under the official designation ice cider, from La Cidrerie St-Nicholas, appeared in a Quebec government-run liquor store, the Société des alcools du Québec (SAQ), in 1999. This was also the first year the authorities allowed the use of the term ice cider, having previously disallowed it out of concern that it would be confused with traditional cider. Today, there are over 60 producers of ice cider. This has inspired producers elsewhere, and ice cider production can now be found in Western Canada, Europe, and the United States. Expansion initially occurred in regions bordering Quebec, including the province of Ontario and the U.S. state of Vermont. In 2008, a provincial regulation by the Quebec government defined the conditions of production, and in December 2014, Quebec ice cider obtained a protected appellation (IGP), which establishes international rules and requirements for production.

The Quebec winter allows apples to freeze naturally, which can then be used for ice cider. However, ice cider requires four to five times as many apples as regular cider to produce the same quantity. Currently, there are around 50 ice cider producers in Quebec. The climate requirements have slowed the expansion of production, but production is beginning around the world. The U.S. state of Vermont is one area in particular where cider production is increasing. The continued expansion of ice cider around the world has resulted in the industry winning a number of prizes. In 2007, La Fundación de la Sidra in Spain awarded Christian Barthomeuf its top prize for inventing ice cider and La Face Cachée de la Pomme for contributing to the development and commercialization in Quebec and around the world.

== Production ==
Ice cider can be made using two processes that concentrate the natural sugars in apples at low temperatures: cryoconcentration and cryoextraction. The most common apples used for the production of ice cider are McIntosh, Cortland, Empire, and Spartan. Due to cryoextraction requiring the apples to remain on the branches later than they are typically picked, new breeds of apple have been developed specifically for the production of ice cider.

The process of cryoconcentration is similar to what Indigenous Canadians observed when maple syrup could be concentrated by the cold. After letting it freeze, a piece would be broken off, which would be more concentrated. The process of cryoextraction is directly inspired by the production of ice wine.

=== Cryoconcentration ===
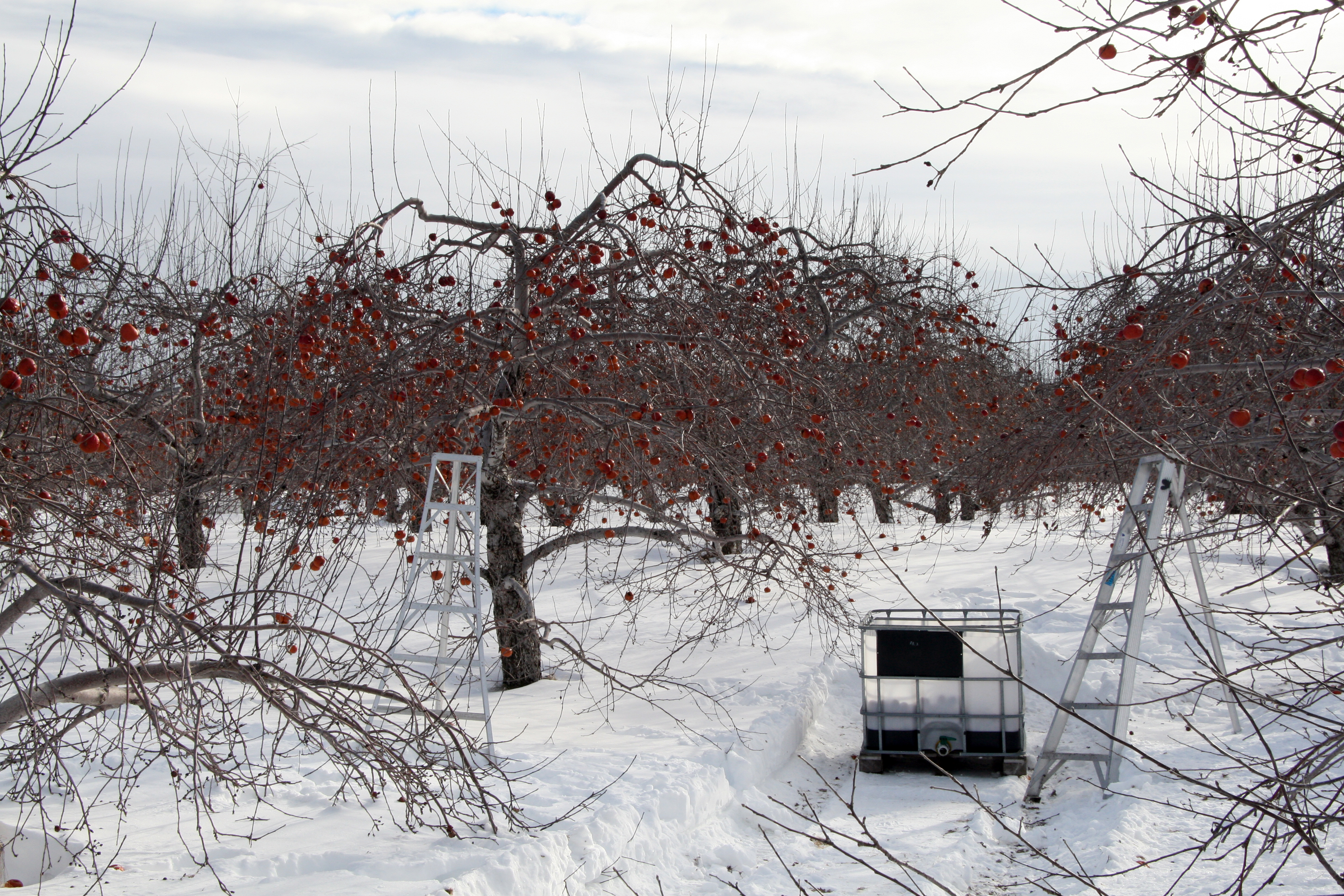
Apples left on the branch through winter

The most common method (close to 95% of ice cider production) involves harvesting apples at maturity in autumn and keeping them fresh until they can be pressed in the winter. The resulting juice is then placed in containers outdoors during winter for approximately 6 months. Slowly, the water freezes, and the sugar separates, and the must is harvested by gravity as the ice crystals rest on the surface due to their lower density.

Certain producers perform a second cryoconcentration to increase the initial sugar level before fermentation. After that, at the lowest temperature, the harvested must is fermented in vats for six to seven months before being bottled. This method gives the producer much greater control and involvement over the production process.

=== Cryoextraction ===
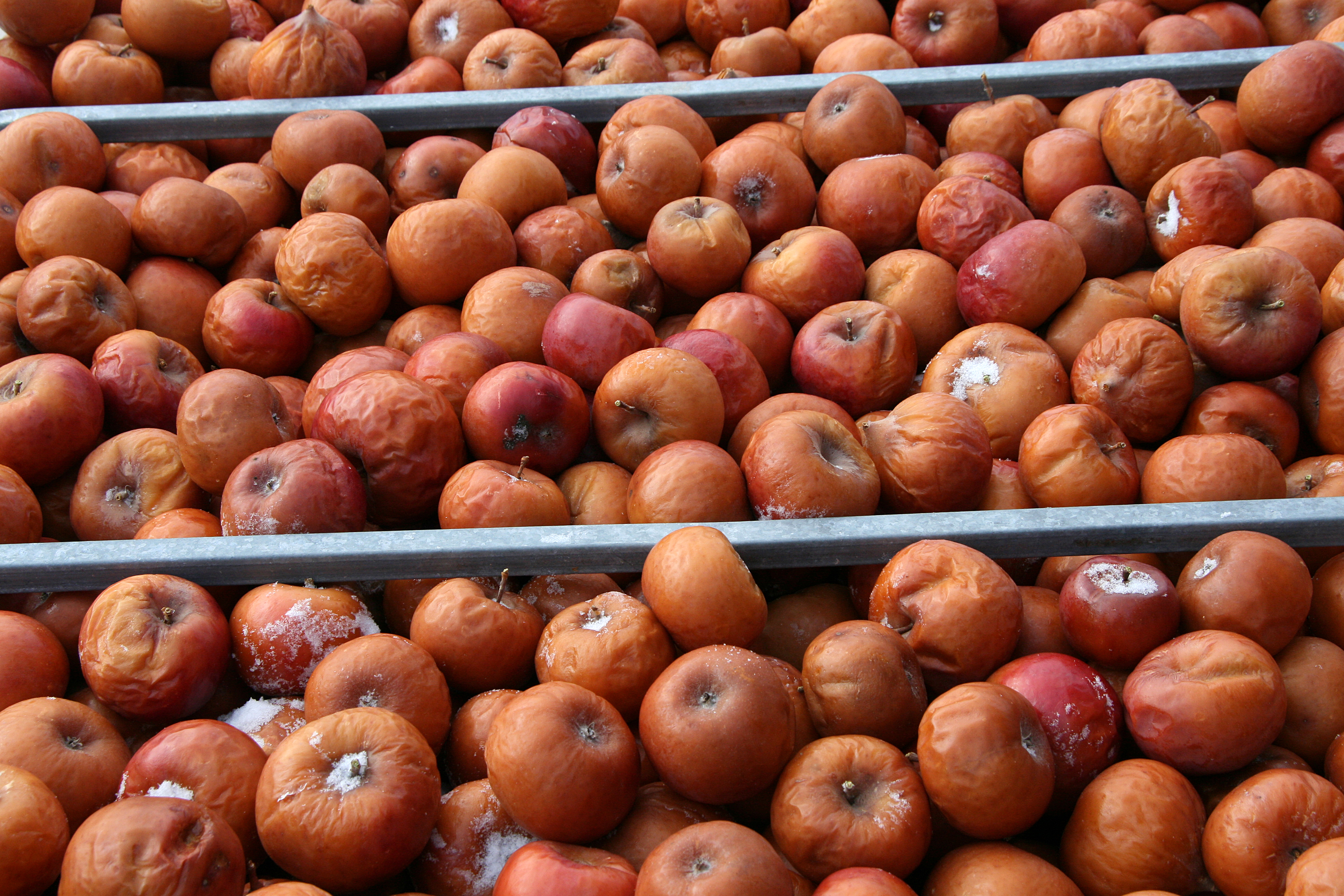
Frozen apples destined to become ice cider through cryoextraction

In this method, frozen apples are left on the branch until the middle of winter, where they are dried out by the cold, the sun, and the wind. They are picked when the temperature is between −15 and −8 °C (5 and 18 °F), usually after three nights at those temperatures. This can require a large amount of labor on short notice and completely determined by the weather, so it is possible to harvest the apples at maturity and leave them outside until the weather is cold enough. This technique is very similar to how Amarone or straw wine is created, and is identical to the production of ice wine.

Therefore, the process of decantation of the water and the juice occurs within the fruit rather than in the juice. The apples are then pressed, frozen further, and the resulting nectar is harvested and fermented at a low temperature for around 8 months. This method is more delicate and greatly increases production costs because more apples are needed to produce the same amount of cider as with traditional methods. It can take 50–100 apples to make one bottle of ice cider. It is also important to note that because this method relies heavily upon the weather cooperating, in some years production is not possible if temperatures do not go low enough.

=== Other methods ===
It is also possible to combine the two methods to make ice cider. It takes on average 1.7 kilograms (3.7 lb) of apples to create 1 litre (0.22 imp gal; 0.26 US gal) regular cider compared with 9.5 kilograms (21 lb) of apples to create 1 litre (0.22 imp gal; 0.26 US gal) of ice cider.

== Definition and requirements ==
Ice cider must meet several requirements set by the Artisan cider producers of Quebec. Drinks must be produced by fermenting apple juice with a sugar concentration of 30 °Bx before fermentation, at cold temperatures caused solely by the natural temperature, and the product must have a residual sugar content of at least 130 grams per litre (0.0047 lb/cu in). Finally, the alcohol by volume must be more than 7% and less than 13%. In addition, these specifics must be met:

1. No chaptalization;
2. No addition of alcohol;
3. No artificial apple juice or grape must;
4. Artificial cold of −4 °C (25 °F) is permitted for malic precipitation;
5. No additional flavours or colouring;
6. No concentration of sugars by methods other than natural cold;
7. No use of concentrated apple juice, regardless of origin, whatsoever;
8. Organoleptic profile of the product corresponds to that of an ice cider as determined by a trade committee;
9. The producer of ice cider cultivates the apples;
10. The pressing, preparation and bottling of ice cider occur at the site of production.

The purpose of these regulations is to protect true ice cider from cheaper replicas that do not follow as rigorous a production process. In addition, the government of Quebec has expressed plans to grant a specific appellation for Quebec Ice Cider to distinguish it from ice cider produced using the same methods but outside of Quebec.

== Characteristics ==
Ice cider is typically served as an apéritif before a meal or, after a meal, with a cheese plate or dessert. Its higher alcohol content and more expensive production process mean it is typically sold in 375 millilitres (13.2 imp fl oz; 12.7 US fl oz) bottles (half the size of a typical wine bottle), but 200 millilitres (7.0 imp fl oz; 6.8 US fl oz) bottles are becoming increasingly popular. It is described as "rich in apple flavours" but the taste can vary greatly depending on the cider's origin and production method. Cryoextraction in particular, being the more expensive of the two, produces a cider with a more complex flavour, including "caramel and spice notes" among others.

== See also ==
- Applejack (beverage)
- Dessert wine
- Fruit wine
- Ice wine
