= Corby Spirit and Wine =

Canadian alcohol company

Corby Spirit and Wine Limited

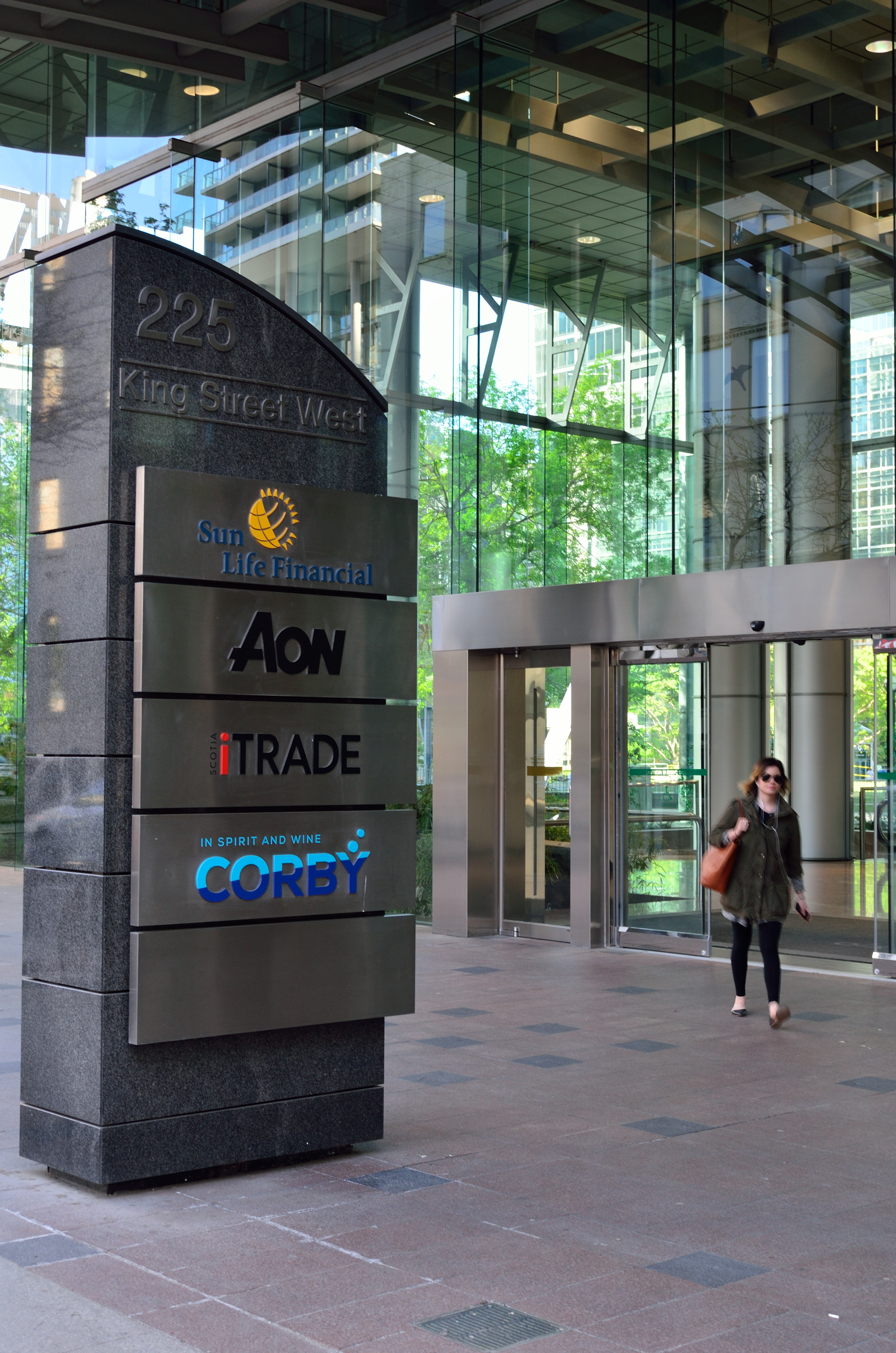
- Corby Spirit and Wine headquarters at 225 King St West, Toronto
- Company type: Public
- Traded as: TSX: CSW.A (voting); TSX: CSW.B (non-voting)
- Industry: Alcohol industry
- Founder: Henry Corby
- Headquarters: Toronto, Ontario, Canada
- Products: Alcoholic beverages
- Owner: Pernod Ricard (46% of total equity, 51% of voting shares)
- Number of employees: 310
- Website: www.corby.ca

Corby Spirit and Wine Limited is a Canadian alcohol manufacturing and distribution company. It was founded in 1859 in Corbyville, Ontario. As of 2008, the company is 46% owned by Pernod Ricard. The company distills several Canadian specialities, as well as marketing Pernod Ricard's products in Canada. Corby is listed on the Toronto Stock Exchange under the trading symbols CSW.A and CSW.B. Corby is known for funding free travel on the TTC on New Years Eve in Toronto.

== History ==
- 1837, Henry Corby sells his bakery and starts buying grain before he opens his distillery in Corbyville, ON, near Belleville
- 1905, sold to Mortimer Davis as "H. Corby Distillery Company Limited"
- 1918, sold to Canadian Industrial Alcohol Company Limited, merged with JP Wiser's Distillery Limited of Prescott, Ontario, J.M. Douglas and Company Limited, and Robert Macnish and Co. Limited of Scotland.
- 1935 Gooderham and Worts acquires 51% share
- 1952, the company wins right to produce United Rum Merchants of London's Lamb's Rum in Canada
- 1954, the company buys stake in Tia Maria
- 1969, the name is changed to "Corby Distilleries Limited – Les Distilleries Corby Limitée"
- 1978, purchases Meagher's Distillery Limited of Montreal and its subsidiary, The William Mara Company of Toronto
- 1985, Corby's parent company is purchased by Allied Lyons PLC
- 1988, Corby divests itself of Robert MacNish Scotch Company, purchases McGuinness Distilling Co. Ltd from Heublein, and the spirits division of Nabisco
- 1989, the distillery in Corbyville, Ontario closes
- 1991, Corby buys Upper Canada Brewing Company, resold in 1995
- 2005, Corby's parent company purchased by Pernod Ricard of France
- 2006, Corby sells stake in Tia Maria to Pernod Ricard and purchases international rights to Lamb's Rum
- 2011, sold 17 of its non-core brands and the Montreal bottling and production facility to Sazerac.
- 2013, Corby changes its name to Corby Spirit and Wine Limited
- 2016, Corby acquires the spirits assets of Domaines Pinnacle Inc., operating as a new Corby subsidiary, Ungava Spirits Co. Ltd.

== Canadian brands ==
Today, Corby owns or represents many of the 25 top-selling brands in Canada and is expanding its sales to the US, Europe and other international markets, such as Australia.

Corby's portfolio includes J.P. Wiser's Whisky, Lamb's rum, Polar Ice vodka and McGuinness liqueurs. Corby also represents leading international brands such as ABSOLUT vodka, Chivas Regal, The Glenlivet distillery and Ballantine's Scotch whiskies, Jameson Irish Whiskey, Beefeater Gin, Malibu rum, Kahlúa liqueur, Mumm Champagne, and Jacob's Creek, Stoneleigh, Graffigna, Campo Viejo, and Wyndham Estate wines.

- Wiser's whisky
- Polar Ice Vodka
- Lamb's Rum
- McGuinness Liqueur Family
- Pike Creek Canadian Whisky
- Lot 40 Canadian Whisky
- Hiram Walker's Special Old
- Royal Reserve
- Cabot Trail
- Ungava Premium Gin
- The Foreign Affair Winery
- Chic Choc
