= Devonshire Lodge =

- Interactive map of the Devonshire Lodge area
- Alternative names: Low–Martin House

General information
- Type: Mansion
- Location: 2021 Ontario Street; Windsor, Ontario, Canada
- Coordinates: 42°18′52.8″N 83°0′22.6″W
- Year built: 1927

Technical details
- Floor count: 2
- Floor area: 450 m^{2} (4,800 ft^{2})

Design and construction
- Architect: George Lawton

The Devonshire Lodge, also known as the Low–Martin House, is a mansion located in the Walkerville neighbourhood of Windsor, Ontario, Canada.

Commissioned by the rum-runner Harry Low in 1927 and designed by George Lawton, likely with input from Low, the mansion and its accompanying coach house were built in the style of a Cotswold cottage and completed in 1928. After Low defaulted on his mortgage, the building was sold in 1938 and again in 1949. It was purchased in 1961 by Paul Martin Sr., the member of Parliament representing Essex East, and he lived there until his death.

By 2008, the Lodge required extensive renovations, which were ultimately undertaken over a two-year period by Vern Myslichuk after he purchased it in 2012. The Devonshire Lodge was designated under the Ontario Heritage Act in 2008.

== Description ==
The Devonshire Lodge is located at 2021 Ontario Street in the Walkerville neighbourhood of Windsor, Ontario, Canada. The 450-square-metre (4,800 ft^{2}) mansion is situated diagonally on the one-half-acre (0.20 ha) property. A coach house, originally designed to house three automobiles and covering an area of 160 square metres (1,700 ft^{2}), is located behind the mansion. This building also previously provided servants' quarters.

The two-and-a-half-storey mansion is built of rusticated stone trimmed in limestone and has a crescent-shaped footprint. The façade is convex and includes numerous asymmetrical bays, with decorations including oriel windows, a recessed balconette, and jerkin-headed gables. The building is topped with an undulating asphalt shingle roof; the original design had used thin wooden shingles. The front entrance, an ornate arched door, is accessed through a winding stone path marked with the words "Devonshire Lodge". The carriage house is built in a similar style.

The interior of the Lodge is replete with plaster ceilings, oak parquet floors, and walnut wall panels. A circular cloister on the main floor has 6.1-metre (20 ft); leaded windows cover 4.9 metres (16 ft) of this space. A spiral staircase of oak provides access to the second storey, which has four bedrooms; each of these has a full bathroom. More bathrooms are located in common areas.

The City of Windsor describes the Devonshire Lodge as a Cotswold-style house, the only such building in the city. In its discussion of the Lodge, the Windsor Public Library describes the mansion as an ostentatious building "in a style (or styles, as it seemed to meld several styles together) like no other". The Canadian Broadcasting Corporation describes the mansion as "so unusual on the outside that it defies any particular style", with a Cotswold-style roof as well as turrets, archways, and rounded rooms.

== History ==
=== Harry Low ===
The Devonshire Lodge was built by Harry Low, a rum-runner active in the Windsor area. Low, a tool and die maker by training, moved to Windsor from Ottawa in 1919 to take advantage of the economic boom that followed the end of the First World War. After the passage of prohibition in the United States, Low became the accredited agent for several Montreal-based breweries. He began smuggling operations and also operated a pool hall with an illegal gambling den. By 1927, Low owned a large warehouse and several vessels. Seeking to build a house that reflected his new wealth, he retained the architect George Lawton to design him a mansion.

The building was designed in the style of a Cotswold cottage, though Low likely provided input into its architectural elements; according to the writer Gary May, Low likely drew inspiration from the architecture he had seen during a trip to Europe several years prior. Construction costs are reported to have been between CA$130,000 and $150,000 (equivalent to between $2,200,000 and $2,600,000 in 2023). The Lows occupied the mansion from 1928. Through his rum-running activities, Low worked with members of the Detroit-based Purple Gang as well as the Chicago-based mobster Al Capone; both were reported to have attended the Lodge while conducting business with Low.

=== Paul Martin ===
In the 1930s, after being suspected of murdering a bookkeeper and committing tax evasion, Low came under increased scrutiny. This, together with several failed investments, ultimately led to his bankruptcy. He and his wife vacated the Lodge in 1934, after it failed to reach its asking price at auction. In subsequent decades, the mansion changed ownership several times. In October 1938, Low's mortgage broker sold the building to Helen Wells for $28,000 (equivalent to $600,000 in 2023); she occupied it until her death in 1949, after which the Lodge was sold to the car dealer Donald Duff for $25,000 (equivalent to $300,000 in 2023).

Devonshire Lodge was purchased by Paul Martin Sr. and his wife Nelly in 1961. Martin was a lawyer who had first been elected to the Parliament of Canada, representing Essex East, in the 1935 election, and had held several Cabinet roles; in 1969, he was made the Leader of the Government in the Senate. Consequently, during their tenure the Lodge hosted the prime ministers Lester Pearson and Pierre Trudeau. Another frequent guest was the couple's son, Paul, who would travel there during university holidays; he became prime minister of Canada in 2003. He recalled that he and his younger sister would frequently, but fruitlessly, search the basement for a tunnel to the Detroit River that Low was rumoured to have used in his bootlegging. The Martins remained occupants of the Lodge until their deaths.

=== Subsequent owners ===
In 1995, Devonshire Lodge was sold to the bingo hall proprietor Wayne Pike and his wife Sharon Ann Romnycia. After deciding to move, the owners intended to subdivide the garage and servants' quarters from the main house and sell each property separately. Their severance application was denied in June 2006 by the Committee of Adjustment following community opposition. In April 2008, the Lodge and its attending coach house were designated under the Ontario Heritage Act through By-Law 58-2008; this by-law was amended in October 2012, removing interior features from the heritage description and adding an exterior feature. After initially seeking $1.2 million for the Lodge in the late 1990s, in 2008 Pike and Romnycia sold it to the pharmacy owner Frank Vella for $460,000 (equivalent to $600,000 in 2023). Vella initially intended to renovate the property, but balked after learning that renovations would be primarily invisible.

The mansion was sold to Vern Myslichuk, the owner of Bettermade Cabinets, in 2012. Myslichuk had desired to purchase the house since the 1990s. In an interview, Myslichuk recalled that he had been warned against buying the dilapidated Devonshire Lodge, but considered his cabinet-making experience sufficient for the challenge. He began the renovation process, with the intent of restoring the building to its original condition. He first salvaged the original materials, including bathroom fixtures, doors, and cabinetry. Where retaining original materials was impossible, he searched for replicas; this included acquiring new tiles for the entranceway from their original manufacturer. Several new features were also added, including blown insulation and forced-air gas furnaces. In 2014, he moved into the building, with the intent of continuing work by acquiring period furniture and renovating the coach house.

In 2022, Myslichuk announced that he would be selling the Lodge, which was listed at an asking price of $3.4 million. He told The Windsor Star that he was "almost hoping it doesn't sell", and that he still loved the mansion, but "it's the right time". Although interest was reportedly high at first, the mansion had yet to sell by mid-2024, at which time its asking price had been reduced to $2.9 million. Myslichuk suggested that the city of Windsor acquire the property, similar to the nearby Willistead Manor, though a city representative noted that the manor had been donated. At the same time, Myslichuk and his realtor Razvan Mag advertised the property with promotional videos and professional dance. One video, which claimed that the mansion had been purchased by a Toronto-based developer and was scheduled for demolition before explaining that the scenario was hypothetical, received backlash; Mayor Drew Dilkens posted in an Instagram response that "the property is designated on the heritage register. No developer can tear it down or make alterations with(out) proper approval under the Heritage Act."
