= Rum-running =

Illegal business of smuggling alcoholic beverages

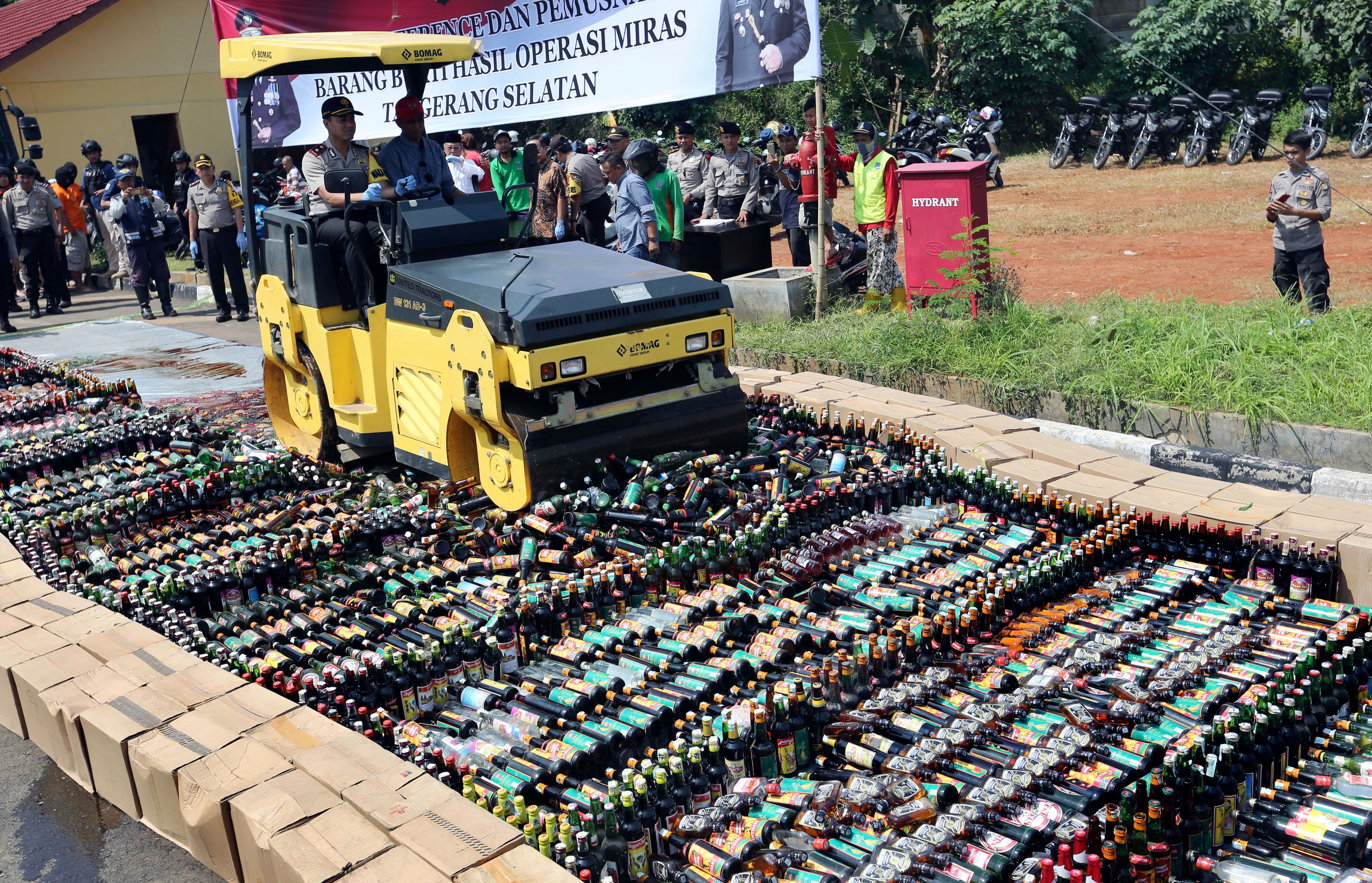
Police use a road roller to destroy bottles of illegal alcohol confiscated in Serpong, out of Jakarta, Indonesia on April 13, 2018.

Rum-running, or bootlegging, is the illegal business of smuggling alcoholic beverages where such transportation is forbidden by law. Smuggling circumvents alcohol taxes and outright prohibition of alcohol sales.

== Alcohol smuggling today ==
In the United States, the smuggling of alcohol did not end with the repeal of prohibition. In the Appalachian United States, for example, the demand for moonshine was at an all-time high in the 1920s, but an era of rampant bootlegging in dry areas continued into the 1970s. Bootlegging still exists, even if on a smaller scale. The state of Virginia has reported that it loses up to $20 million a year from illegal whiskey smuggling.

The Government of the United Kingdom fails to collect an estimated £900 million in taxes due to alcohol smuggling activities.

Absinthe was smuggled into the United States until it was legalized in 2007. Cuban rum is also sometimes smuggled into the United States, circumventing the embargo in existence since 1960.

== Etymology ==
The Oxford English Dictionary records the word-form "bootlegger" as in use from 1889 onwards. According to the 2011 PBS documentary Prohibition, the term bootlegging was popularized when thousands of city dwellers sold liquor from flasks they kept in their boot legs all across major cities and rural areas. The term rum-running was current by 1916, and was used during the Prohibition era in the United States (1920–1933), when ships from Bimini in the western Bahamas transported cheap Caribbean rum to Florida speakeasies. However, rum's cheapness made it a low-profit item for the rum-runners, and they soon moved on to smuggling Canadian whisky, French champagne, and English gin to major cities like New York City, Boston, and Chicago, where prices ran high. It was said that some ships carried $200,000 in contraband in a single run.

== History ==
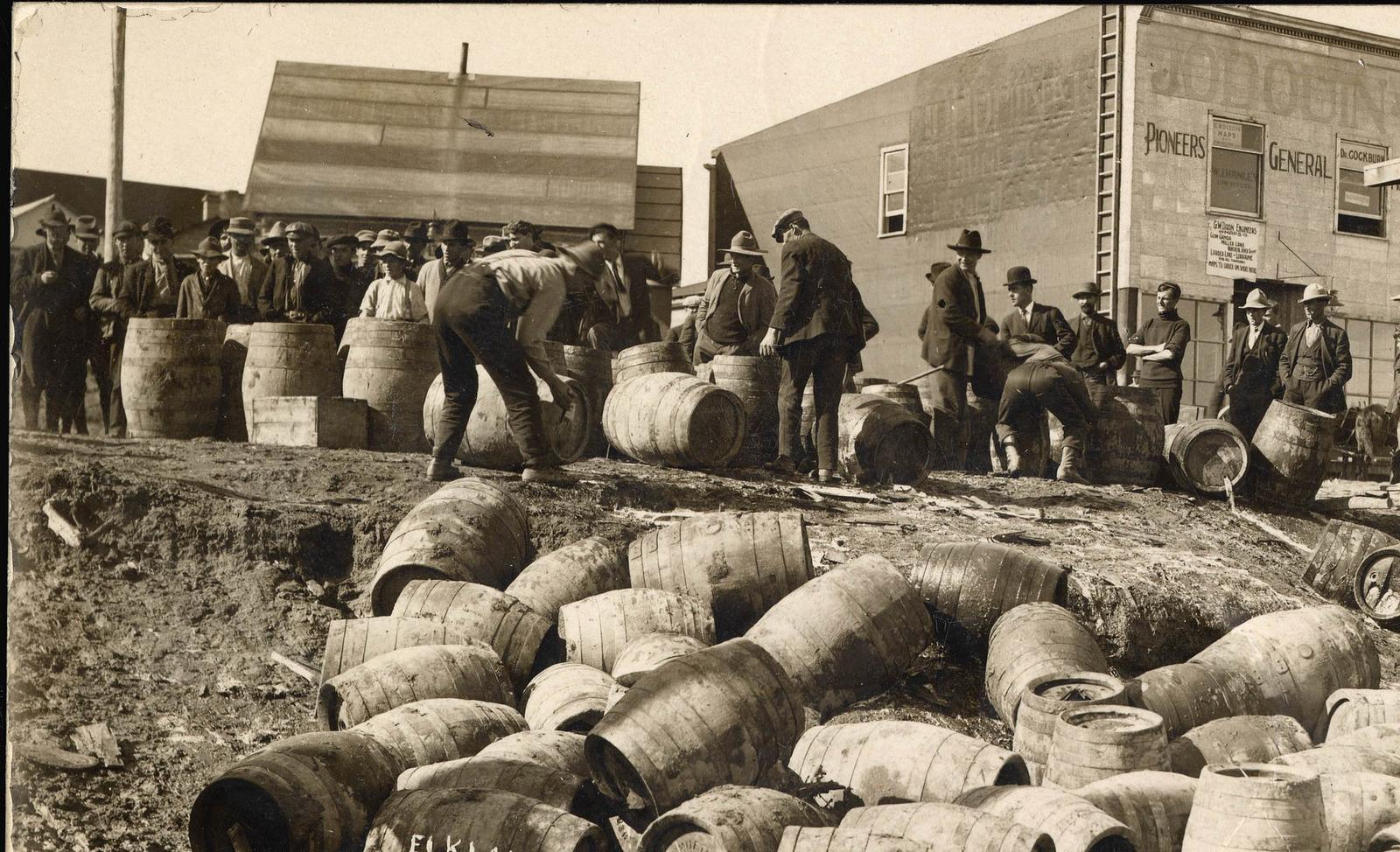
A liquor raid in 1925, in Elk Lake, Ontario

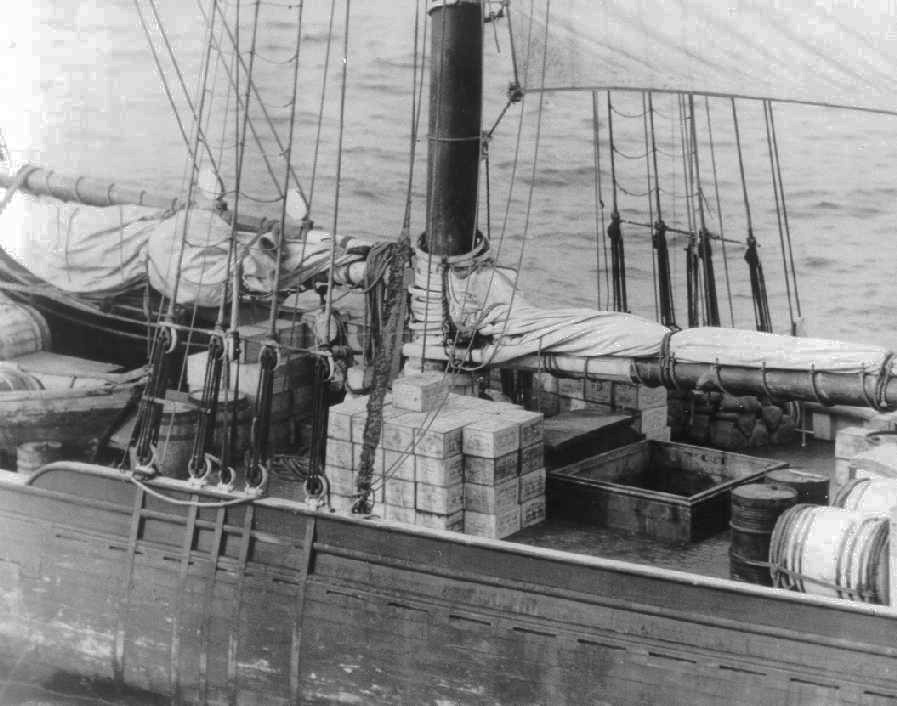
Rum runner schooner Kirk and Sweeney with contraband stacked on deck

It was not long after the first taxes were implemented on alcoholic beverages that someone began to smuggle alcohol. The British government had "revenue cutters" in place to stop smugglers as early as the 16th century. Pirates often made extra money running rum to heavily taxed colonies. There were times when the sale of alcohol was limited for other reasons, such as laws against sales to American Indians in the Old West and Canada West or local prohibitions like the one on Prince Edward Island between 1901 and 1948.

Industrial-scale smuggling flowed both ways across the Canada–United States border at different points in the early twentieth century, largely between Windsor, Ontario and Detroit, Michigan. Out of all of the liquor smuggled into The United States during Prohibition, 75% of it came through Detroit. Although Canada never had true nationwide prohibition, the federal government gave the provinces an easy means to ban alcohol under the War Measures Act (1914), and most provinces and the Yukon Territory already had enacted prohibition locally by 1918 when a regulation issued by the federal cabinet banned the interprovincial trade and importation of liquor. National prohibition in the United States did not begin until 1920, though many states had statewide prohibition before that. For the two-year interval, enough American liquor entered Canada illegally to undermine support for prohibition in Canada, so it was slowly lifted, beginning with Quebec and Yukon in 1919 and including all the provinces but Prince Edward Island by 1930. Additionally, Canada's version of prohibition had never included a ban on the manufacture of liquor for export. Soon the black-market trade was reversed with Canadian whisky and beer flowing in large quantities to the United States. Again, this illegal international trade undermined the support for prohibition in the receiving country, and the American version ended (at the national level) in 1933.

One of the most famous periods of rum-running began in the United States when Prohibition began on January 16, 1920, when the Eighteenth Amendment went into effect. This period lasted until the amendment was repealed with ratification of the Twenty-first Amendment on December 5, 1933.

At first, there was much action on the seas, but after several months, the Coast Guard began reporting decreased smuggling activity. This was the start of the Bimini–Bahamas rum trade and the introduction of Bill McCoy.

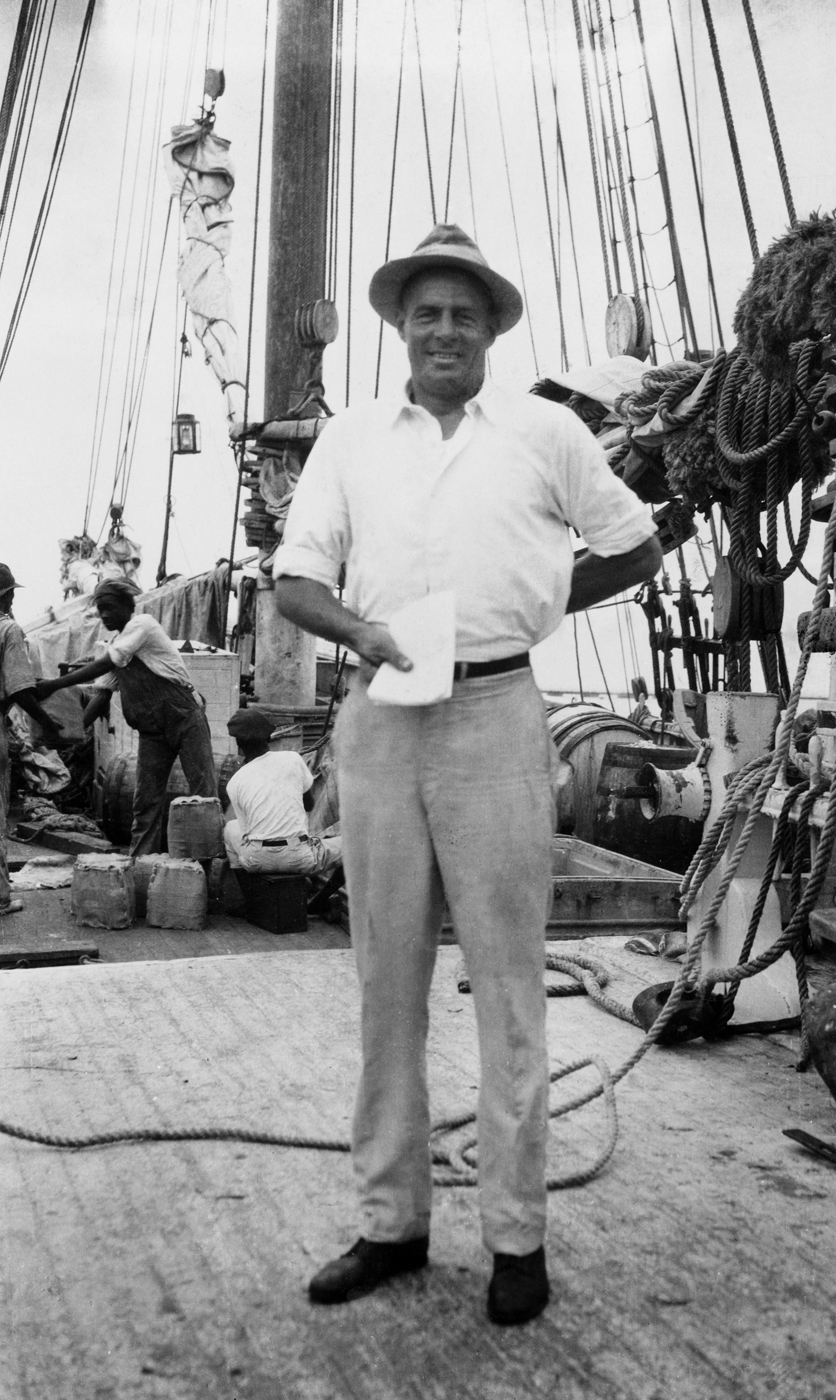
Rum-runner William S. McCoy, Florida area from 1900 to 1920

With the start of prohibition, Captain McCoy began bringing rum from Bimini and the rest of the Bahamas into south Florida through Government Cut. The Coast Guard soon caught up with him, so he began to bring the illegal goods to just outside U.S. territorial waters and let smaller boats and other captains, such as Habana Joe, take the risk of bringing it to shore.

The rum-running business was very good, and McCoy soon bought a Gloucester knockabout schooner named Arethusa at auction and renamed her Tomoka. He installed a larger auxiliary, mounted a concealed machine gun on her deck, and refitted the fish pens below to accommodate as much contraband as she could hold. She became one of the most famous of the rum-runners, along with his two other ships hauling mostly Irish and Canadian whiskey as well as other fine liquors and wines to ports from Maine to Florida.

In the days of rum running, it was common for captains to add water to the bottles to stretch their profits or to re-label it as better goods. Often, cheap sparkling wine would become French champagne or Italian Spumante; unbranded liquor became top-of-the-line name brands. McCoy became famous for never adding water to his booze and selling only top brands. Although the phrase appears in print in 1882, this is one of several false etymologies for the origin of the term "The real McCoy".

On November 15, 1923, McCoy and Tomoka encountered the U.S. Coast Guard Cutter Seneca just outside U.S. territorial waters. A boarding party attempted to board, but McCoy chased them off with the machine gun. Tomoka tried to run, but Seneca placed a shell just off her hull, and William McCoy surrendered his ship and cargo.

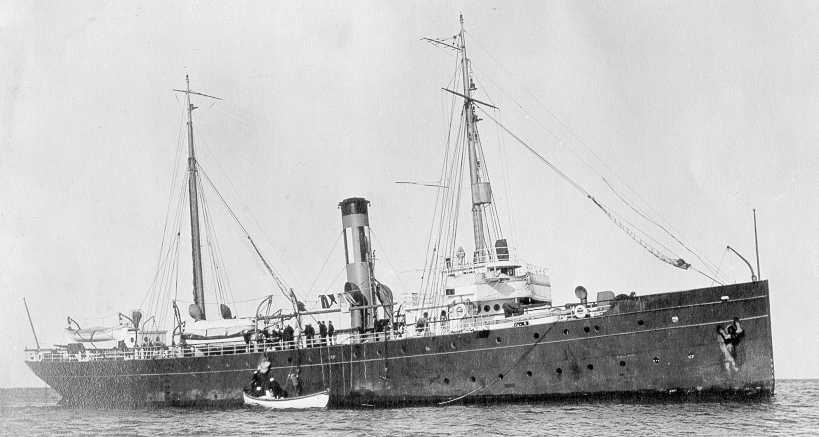
U.S. Coast Guard Cutter Seneca

=== The Rum Row ===
McCoy is credited with the idea of bringing large boats just to the edge of the 3-mile (4.8 km) limit of U.S. jurisdiction and selling his wares there to "contact boats", local fishermen, and small boat captains. The small, quick boats could more easily outrun Coast Guard ships and could dock in any small river or eddy and transfer their cargo to a waiting truck. They were also known to load float planes and flying boats. Soon others were following suit, and the three-mile limit became known as "Rum Line" with the ships waiting called "Rum row". The Rum Line was extended to a 12-mile (19 km) limit by an act of the United States Congress on April 21, 1924, which made it harder for the smaller and less seaworthy craft to make the trip.

Rum Row was not the only front for the Coast Guard. Rum-runners often made the trip through Canada via the Great Lakes and the Saint Lawrence Seaway and down the west coast to San Francisco and Los Angeles. Rum-running from Canada was also an issue, especially throughout prohibition in the early 1900s. There was a high number of distilleries in Canada, one of the most famous being Hiram Walker who developed Canadian Club Whisky. The French islands of Saint-Pierre and Miquelon, located south of Newfoundland, were an important base used by well-known smugglers, including Al Capone, Savannah Unknown, and Bill McCoy. The Gulf of Mexico also teemed with ships running from Mexico and the Bahamas to Galveston, Texas, the Louisiana swamps, and Alabama coast. By far the biggest Rum Row was in the New York/Philadelphia area off the New Jersey coast, where as many as 60 ships were seen at one time. One of the most notable New Jersey rum runners was Habana Joe, who could be seen at night running into remote areas in Raritan Bay with his flat-bottom skiff for running up on the beach, making his delivery, and speeding away.

With that much competition, the suppliers often flew large banners advertising their wares and threw parties with prostitutes on board their ships to draw customers. Rum Row was completely lawless, and many crews armed themselves not against government ships but against the other rum-runners, who would sometimes sink a ship and hijack its cargo rather than make the run to Canada or the Caribbean for fresh supplies.

=== The ships ===
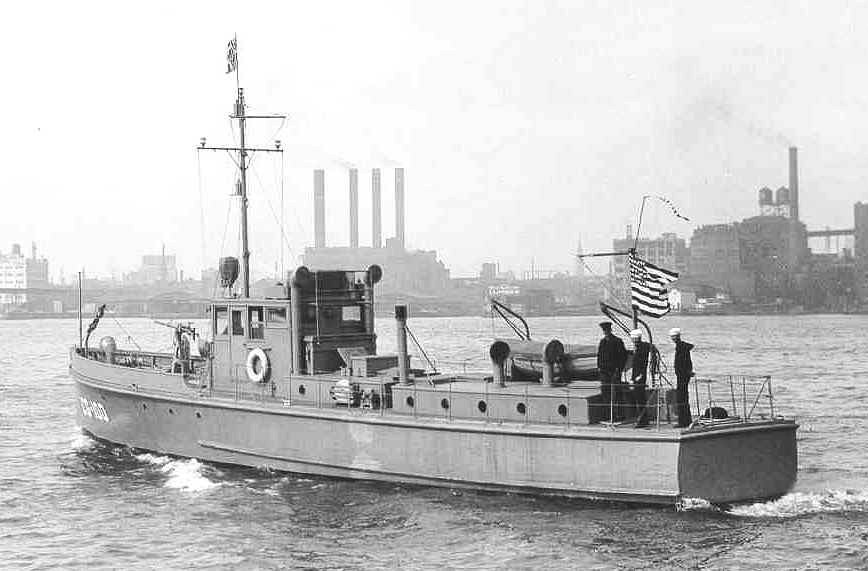
CG-100, a typical 75-foot patrol boat

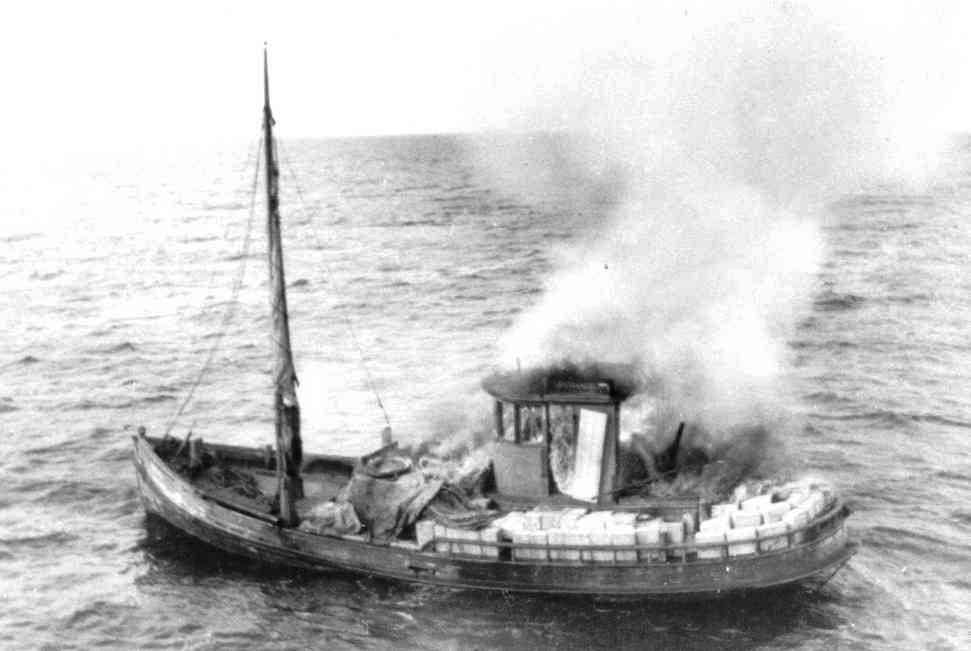
Rum-runner Linwood set afire to destroy evidence

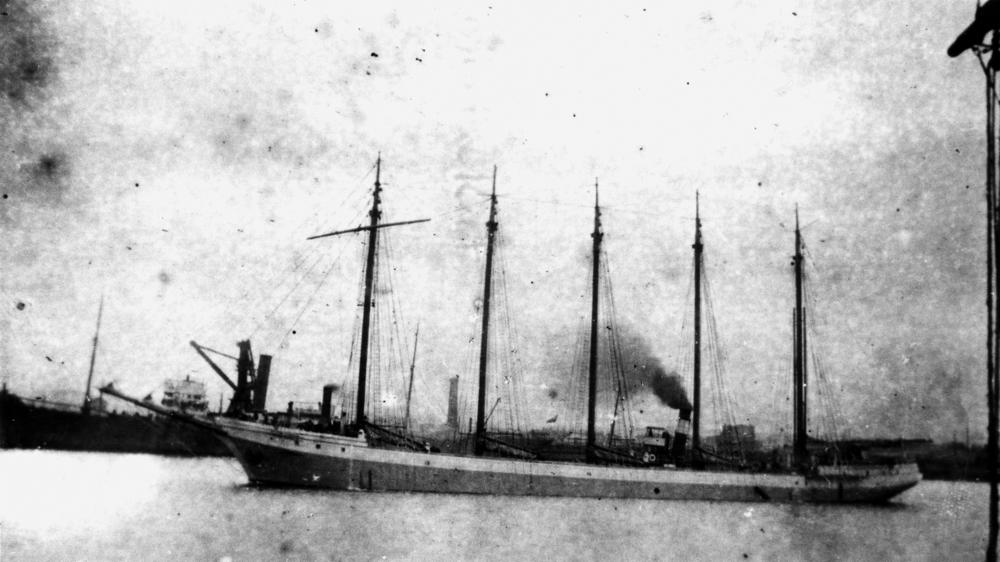
Pacific Coast offshore rum-runner Malahat, a five-masted schooner

At the start, the rum-runner fleet consisted of a ragtag flotilla of fishing boats, such as the schooner Nellie J. Banks, excursion boats, and small merchant craft. As prohibition wore on, the stakes got higher and the ships became larger and more specialized. Converted fishing ships like McCoy's Tomoka waited on Rum Row and were soon joined by small motor freighters custom-built in Nova Scotia for rum running, with low, grey hulls, hidden compartments, and powerful wireless equipment. Examples include the Reo II. Specialized high-speed craft were built for the ship-to-shore runs. These high-speed boats were often luxury yachts and speedboats fitted with powerful aircraft engines, machine guns, and armor plating. Often, builders of rum-runners' ships also supplied Coast Guard vessels, such as Fred and Mirto Scopinich's Freeport Point Shipyard. Rum-runners often kept cans of used engine oil handy to pour on hot exhaust manifolds in case a screen of smoke was needed to escape the revenue ships.

On the government's side, the rum chasers were an assortment of patrol boats, inshore patrol, and harbor cutters. Most of the patrol boats were of the "six-bit" variety: 75-foot craft with a top speed of about 12 knots. There was also an assortment of launches, harbor tugs, and miscellaneous small craft.

The rum-runners were often faster and more maneuverable than government ships, and a rum-running captain could make several hundred thousand dollars a year. In comparison, the Commandant of the Coast Guard made just $6,000 annually, and seamen made $30/week. Because of this disparity, the rum-runners were generally willing to take bigger risks. They ran without lights at night and in fog, risking life and limb. Shores could sometimes be found littered with bottles from a rum-runner who sank after hitting a sandbar or a reef in the dark at high speed.

The Coast Guard relied on hard work, reconnaissance, and big guns to get their job done. It was not uncommon for rum-runners' ships to be sold at auction shortly after a trial – ships were often sold back to the original owners. Some ships were captured three or four times before they were finally sunk or retired. In addition, the Coast Guard had other duties and often had to let a rum-runner go in order to assist a sinking vessel or handle another emergency.

=== Rum-running in Northern Europe in the 1920s and 1930s ===
Prohibitive alcohol laws in Finland (total ban of alcohol from 1919 to 1931), Norway (liquor above 20 per cent abv 1917–1927) and the Swedish Bratt System which heavily restricted the sale of alcohol made these three countries attractive for alcohol smuggling from abroad. The main product used for smuggling were rectified spirits produced in Central Europe (Germany, Poland, Netherlands etc.). Alcohol was legally exported on large ships as tax-free produce via ports like Hamburg, Tallinn, Kiel and particularly the Free City of Danzig. Similar to the Rum Row near the U.S. coast, these ships usually did not leave international waters and the alcohol was clandestinely loaded onto smaller boats that illegally brought it into the destination countries. Despite various efforts led by Finland to fight contraband (Helsinki Convention for the Suppression of the Contraband Traffic in Alcoholic Liquors of 1925), the smugglers managed to bypass anti-smuggling laws, e.g., through the use of flags of convenience.

== See also ==
- Alcohol laws of the United States
- Alcohol in Colonial America
- American gangsters during the 1920s
- American Whiskey Trail
- Bootleggers and Baptists
- Bureau of Prohibition
- Bureau of Alcohol, Tobacco, Firearms and Explosives (ATF)
- Dry state
- Govenlock, Saskatchewan
- History of stock car racing
- Iron law of prohibition
- Izzy Einstein and Moe Smith
- Nellie J. Banks
- Organized crime
- Prohibition
- Prohibition in Canada
- Prohibition in the United States
- Repeal of Prohibition
- Shebeen
- United States Customs Service
- Volstead Act
- Webb–Kenyon Act
