= Sherwood v. Walker =

American contract law case

- Court: Michigan Supreme Court
- Full case name: Theodore C. Sherwood v. Hiram Walker et al.
- Decided: July 7, 1887
- Citations: 66 Mich. 568, 33 N.W. 919 (Mich. 1887)

Case history
- Prior actions: Wayne Co. Cir. Ct., first trial, jury verdict for plaintiff
- Appealed from: Wayne Co. Cir. Ct.
- Subsequent actions: Wayne Co. Cir. Ct., on remand, jury verdict for plaintiff

Court membership
- Judges sitting: James V. Campbell; John W. Champlin; Allen B. Morse; Thomas R. Sherwood

Case opinions
- Allen B. Morse (majority); Thomas R. Sherwood (dissent)

Keywords
- Contracts; Sale; Mistake; Rescission

Sherwood v. Walker, 66 Mich. 568, 33 N.W. 919 (Mich. 1887), was a case that has played an important role in the evolution of American contract law involving the doctrine of mutual mistake. One of the main issues in the case was whether the remedy of rescission is available if both parties to a contract share a misunderstanding about an essential fact. Commonly referred to as the "Pregnant Cow Case," the case is a staple of first-year law school contract law class discussions and textbooks and has been briefed extensively online.

== Background ==
This case was an action in replevin for possession of a polled Angus cow, which are bred most commonly for the production of beef as opposed to dairy products. The suit was originally brought in a justice's court, a state court within the jurisdiction of Michigan, and appealed to the circuit court of Wayne County, Michigan.

The substance of the appellate decision, which was rendered by the Michigan Supreme Court after the defendant and appellants set out 25 assignments of error, involves a transaction between Hiram Walker et al., importers and breeders of polled Angus cattle (and grocers and distillers), and Theodore Sherwood, a farmer and banker from Plymouth, Michigan. Sherwood sought to purchase cattle. On May 5, 1886, Sherwood called upon the Walkers at their farm and adjacent pasture land in Walkerville, Ontario, but did not find a cow that suited him. Thereafter, the Walkers invited him to visit their farm in Greenfield, Michigan, where they kept a few head of cattle that were "probably barren, and would not breed."

A few days after visiting the Walkers' farm, Sherwood informed them that he wished to purchase the cow known as "Rose 2d of Aberlone." The parties agreed upon a price of 5 1/2 cents per pound live weight, a price that was much less than the value of a fertile Angus breeding cow. Soon thereafter, the Walkers discovered that the cow was in fact with calf and not barren, unlike what they had believed when they entered the agreement with Sherwood. When Sherwood returned to the farm several days later, the Walkers refused to accept payment or to deliver the cow. In turn, Sherwood brought suit in the Justice Court of Plymouth, Michigan, and obtained a writ of replevin for possession of the cow. The Walkers then filed an appeal in Wayne Circuit Court, which conducted a jury trial. During the trial, among other things, the court instructed the jury that "it was immaterial whether the cow was with calf or not." With those instructions, the jury decided in Sherwood's favor and the Walkers appealed.

The appeal was heard in 1887 by the Supreme Court of Michigan. There, the Walkers contended that the contract for the cow was "executory" and claimed that both parties had been mistaken as to the nature of the cow as barren or fertile and able to bear calves. At trial, the Walkers argued that they had mistakenly agreed to sell the cow at the price of a barren cow, which was $80. They also argued that because the cow was in fact with calf, she was actually worth between $750 and $1000. The issue (under Michigan contract law) was whether the defendants (Walkers) could refuse to deliver the cow because, as a factual matter, the parties entered their contract with the shared and mistaken understanding that the cow was infertile.

== Judgment ==
The Michigan Supreme Court held that the trial court's jury instructions were incorrect, and granted the Walker defendants' request for a new trial. On remand, the trial court was to instruct the jury that the defendants had a right to rescind the contract "if they found that the cow was sold ... upon the understanding of both parties that she was barren, and useless for the purpose of breeding...."

Ultimately, after a second trial, the jury entered another verdict for the plaintiff. If it is assumed that the trial court proceeded in accordance with the appellate decision, the second jury's verdict indicates a factual finding that any mistake concerning the cow's fertility was not mutual. Thus, in the end, the contract was able to be rescinded, and Sherwood (the buyer) kept the cow.

== See also ==
- Mistake
- Meeting of the minds
- Lenawee County Board of Health v. Messerly
