= Gotfredson Truck Corporation =

Defunct American motor vehicle manufacturer

- Type: Truck and Car Company
- Industry: Manufacturing
- Founded: 1920; 106 years ago
- Founder: Benjamin Gotfredson
- Defunct: 1948; 78 years ago
- Headquarters: Detroit, US
- Products: Trucks cars

The Gotfredson Truck Corporation of Detroit, was a truck and car manufacturer.

== History ==
In 1909, Benjamin Gotfredson founded the American Auto Trimming Company in Detroit.The company, with 3,000 employees, was the biggest in the world, specialized in painting and trimming. The factory was located at 3100 Meldrum Avenue in Detroit. Alongside Benjamin Gotfredson, R.B. Gotfredson served as vice president.

In 1920, the first Gotfredson trucks were made in Walkerville, Ontario, Canada. Besides Montreal and Toronto, there was also a branch in London, England. Gotfredson quickly became the biggest truck manufacturer in Canada. The company first started in the USA in Detroit in 1923. The factory was located at 3601 Gratiot Avenue. In February 1923, Gotfredson was able to buy the Harroun Motor Factory in Wayne, Michigan.

In 1924, Gotfriedson owned four factories. Two of them were in Detroit, one in Cleveland, and one in Wayne. However, the sales figures for complete trucks were rather low compared to other manufacturers of the era. In 1929, only 189 trucks could be sold.
