= Vincent C. Ziegler =

- Born: 1911
- Died: 1979
- Occupation: Business executive
- Years active: 1946-1979 (Gillette)
- Employer(s): Gillette Company, Chrysler Corporation, Hiram Walker Inc.
- Known for: Chairman and CEO of Gillette Company; Introduction of Trac II razor and Cricket Lighter.
- Title: Chairman and CEO
- Term: 1966-1979

Vincent C. Ziegler (1911–1979) was an American business executive who served as a chairman and CEO of the Gillette Company.

== Career ==
Ziegler joined Gillette Company in 1946 and became its head in 1966. His tenure saw Gillette's revenues rise from $340 million to over $1 billion by 1973, marking the company's most successful financial period. Under Ziegler's leadership, Gillette introduced the Trac II razor and the Cricket Lighter. He also led the acquisition of non-toiletry companies. Prior to Gillette, Ziegler was employed by Chrysler Corporation and Hiram Walker Inc.
