= James Trager =

James Garfield Trager (May 27, 1925 – February 29, 2012) was an American writer.

== Early life and education ==
Born in White Plains, New York, and raised in Scarsdale, he pursued a degree in history from Harvard University, graduating in 1946.

== Career ==
Trager wrote ads for Canadian Club whisky, before transitioning to historical writing. In 1975, Trager invested in an early-generation computer for $10,000 to facilitate the organization of his research. This technological adoption led to the creation of The People’s Chronology, a work significant enough for Microsoft to acquire its rights for digital distribution.

Trager authored ten books, among them Letters From Sachiko: A Japanese Woman's View of Life in the Land of the Economic Miracle (1982), which was noted for its depiction of Japanese life and partly inspired by his second wife, Chie Nishio.

The People's Chronology stands out in Trager's bibliography for presenting a timeline of human events starting from 3 million B.C., based on fossil evidence. The work includes diverse historical facts, from the introduction of Heroin by Bayer in 1898 to the commercial debut of cornflakes by the Kellogg.

Trager expanded his chronology series with The Women's Chronology, The Food Chronology, and The New York Chronology, each focusing on specific themes and their historical significance.

His approach to history emphasized the incremental nature of knowledge and the delayed recognition of events' significance. Trager's works are used as reference materials in libraries and newsrooms, reflecting his dedication to documenting and analyzing historical events and trends.

== Personal life ==
Trager's first marriage was to Olivia A. Hirsch, which ended in divorce in 1967. After his death in 2012, he was survived by his second wife, two sons, a daughter, and three grandchildren.
