= Lenawee County Board of Health v. Messerly =

Lenawee Board of Health v. Messerly
- Court: Supreme Court of Michigan
- Full case name: Lenawee County Board of Health v. Messerly
- Decided: December 23, 1982
- Citation: 331 N.W.2d 203; 417 Mich. 17

Case history
- Appealed from: Lenawee County Circuit Court (1979), Michigan Court of Appeals (295 N.W.2d 903, 1980)

Court membership
- Judges sitting: John W. Fitzgerald, Thomas G. Kavanagh, G. Mennen Williams, Mary S. Coleman, Charles Levin, James L. Ryan (Note: Justice Dorothy Comstock Riley did not take part in the case.)

Case opinions
- Majority: Ryan, joined by Fitzgerald, Kavanagh, Williams, Levin, Coleman

Keywords
- Contract law; Rescission

Lenawee County Board of Health v. Messerly, 331 N.W.2d 203 (1982) is a US contract law case decided by the Supreme Court of Michigan. It used a risk of loss analysis to justify the denial of rescission as a contract remedy despite the presence of mutual mistake.

== Facts ==
The Pickles bought a 600-square-foot (56 m^{2}) three-unit dwelling for use as a rental property from the Messerlys, only to discover that an illegal septic tank had contaminated the ground.

Raw sewage was seeping out of the ground. Lenawee County condemned the property, making it worthless to the buying party Pickles. So, Pickles sought rescission and Messerly sought a deficiency judgment.

== Judgment ==
The Supreme Court of Michigan backed away from the precedent of Sherwood v. Walker in favor of the Restatement (Second) of Contracts, and relied on an "as is" clause in the land contract to deny rescission.

== See also ==
- US contract law
- Toxic asset
