= Nellie J. Banks =

1910 cod fishing schooner

History

Canada
- Name: Nellie J. Banks
- Owner: Alfred Banks
- Operator: Alfred Banks (1910), Captain Edward Dicks & Ray Clarke (1938), Captain Maguire (1941)
- Builder: Howard Allen and Company
- Launched: September 1910
- Completed: 1910
- Renamed: 1941 Leona G. Maguire
- Home port: Registered: Shelburne, Nova Scotia
- Captured: Seized: 1927 Seized: August 1938
- Fate: Burnt on shore of Murray Harbour, PEI 1953

General characteristics
- Class & type: Cod Fishing Schooner
- Tonnage: 35 GRT
- Length: 57 feet 3 tenths
- Beam: 17 feet 8 tenths
- Propulsion: sail until 1916 when an engine was put in

Nellie J. Banks was a 35 GRT cod fishing schooner turned "rum runner", built in 1910. She was one of the last rum runners seized off the coast of Nova Scotia in 1938. Nellie J. Banks was renamed Leona G. Maguire in 1941.

== Description ==
Nellie J. Banks was a schooner with two masts (the usual foremast and two top masts), and a black hull. The ship was 57 feet 3 inches long, with a beam of 18 feet, and a depth of 7 feet. She had a GRT of 35 and was propelled by sail until 1916, when an engine was brought aboard. Nellie J. Banks was constructed by Freeman Pyzant of Lockeport, with the objective of speed, as she was built for the cod fishing industry. It has been said that she looked more like a yacht than a fishing schooner, given her neat rigging and sheer.

== Brief history ==
The ship was built by Alfred Banks from Nova Scotia in 1910 and launched 21 October 1910, from the shipyard of Howard Allen and Company of Allendale Nova Scotia. Her port of registry was Shelburne, Nova Scotia. She was used for fishing until 1926.

In September 1926, Ray Clarke and Captain Edward Dicks bought her for about $2,000. They decided to buy her because they thought she was the perfect vessel for smuggling booze to Prince Edward Island, the province mostly affected by the 1901 prohibition.

In 1927, she was seized by the coastguard ship Bayfield. That was only a small setback for Nellie J. Banks and crew; the boat continued smuggling until she was finally seized in August 1938 by the R.C.M.P cutter Ulna. She was then towed back to Charlottetown, Prince Edward Island.

In 1941, Nellie J. Banks was renamed Leona G. Maguire, after her new captain's daughter. In the early part of 1943, a sea Captain named Roberts lived aboard her in Murray Harbour, Prince Edward Island. In 1947, she was permanently tied up in Murray Harbour, PEI. Around 1950, when she had become too old and an eyesore, Maquire decided to pull the schooner out of the water and rebuild her. John MacDonald was selected as the right man to do this, but once she was pulled up near his home in Murray Harbour, PEI, the money did not come fast enough to effect the necessary repairs, and the ship's condition worsened. Finally, she became an eyesore, a pitifully lonely sight on the edge of the water. The land on which she was propped up was sold.

The new landowner, Joe Bell, convinced William Harris that he had permission from Captain Maquire to burn the boat. One night in 1953, he went with oily rags, newspapers, and matches to put her out of her misery. He stood back from the heat as the flames from the burning timbers consumed her dry bones, having no inkling that a wealth of Prince Edward Island history was disappearing in front of him. The big timbers that Howard Allen had so tenderly laid out in his shipyard took more than a night to burn.

== In popular culture ==
- Nellie J. Banks is the ship that smuggled Agnes Jemima/Aunt Victoria and Daisy/Nicole out of Gilead, to Canada, in Margaret Atwood's novel, The Testaments (2019), Book Index 91, and the escapees' witness testimonies were compiled in the Annals of the Nellie J. Banks: Two Adventurers
- The Nellie J. Banks is the title of a song by McGinty based on the true story of the ships rum smuggling days. It is track 2 on the Album Sea Songs published in 2000.

== See also ==
- Rum-running in Windsor
