= Willistead Manor =

Historic house in Ontario, Canada

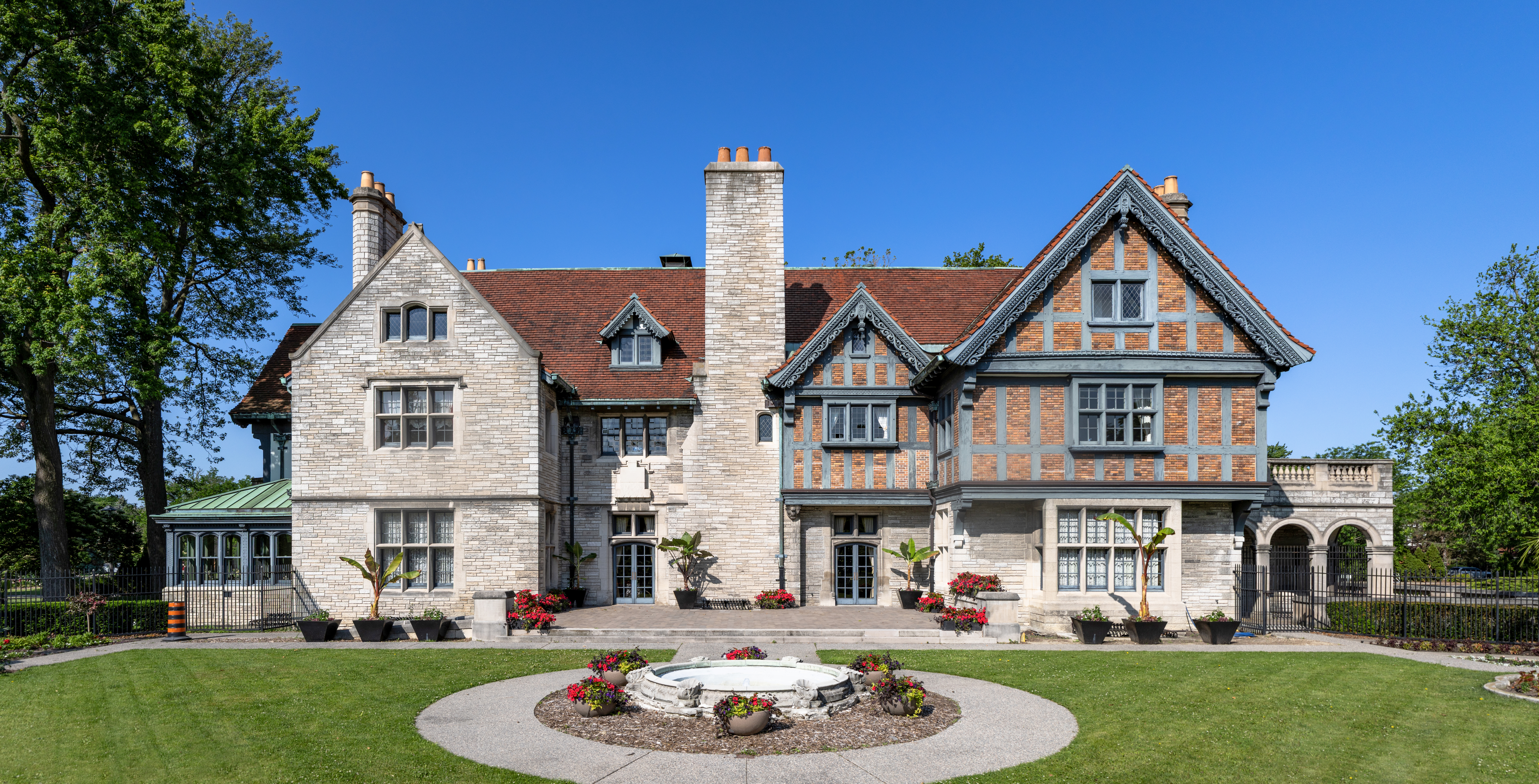
- Established: 1935
- Location: 1899 Niagara Street; Windsor, Ontario, Canada; N8Y 1K3
- Coordinates: 42.31823°N 83.01044°W
- Type: Historic House
- Website: Willistead Manor

Willistead Manor is a historic house located in the former town of Walkerville, Ontario, Canada, now part of Windsor. Designed by Albert Kahn for Edward Chandler Walker and built between 1904 and 1906, the manor was ceded to the community in 1921, a few years after Walker's death. Having served as the Walkerville Town Hall, Art Gallery of Windsor and as a public library branch, it is currently used as a banquet hall. The manor is designed in the Tudor Revival style, and the grounds also include a coach house and a gate house of similar design.

== Description and location ==
Willistead Manor is located at 1899 Niagara Street in the Walkerville district of Windsor, Ontario. The property sits atop a 6.2 hectares (15 acres) plot of parkland and consists of the manor proper, a coach house, and a gate house. The property is surrounded by an iron-and-limestone fence and also features a fountain commissioned to celebrate the Diamond Jubilee of Queen Victoria in 1897.

The 36-room manor stands two and a half storeys tall, along an L-shaped plan. It is built in a Tudor Revival style, showing features from both Elizabethan and Jacobean architecture. The façade features a combination of half-timbering, brickwork, and stucco. The gable dormers are steeply pitched, while the vergeboards are hand-carved. The red clay tile roof is adorned with multiple chimneys, each in a different style, while the walls feature various windows. Similar materials and designs are used for the coach house and the gate house.

The interior of the manor is heavily adorned. Most rooms include marble fireplaces and quarter-cut panelling. The Great Hall, accessed through a large oak door, includes extensive carvings by Joachim Jungwirth. In the south wing are the dining room, drawing room, and conservatory, all of which are also heavily adorned; the dining room also includes a hidden walk-in safe. The manor's north wing, meanwhile, contains the billiard room, morning room, and library.

== History ==
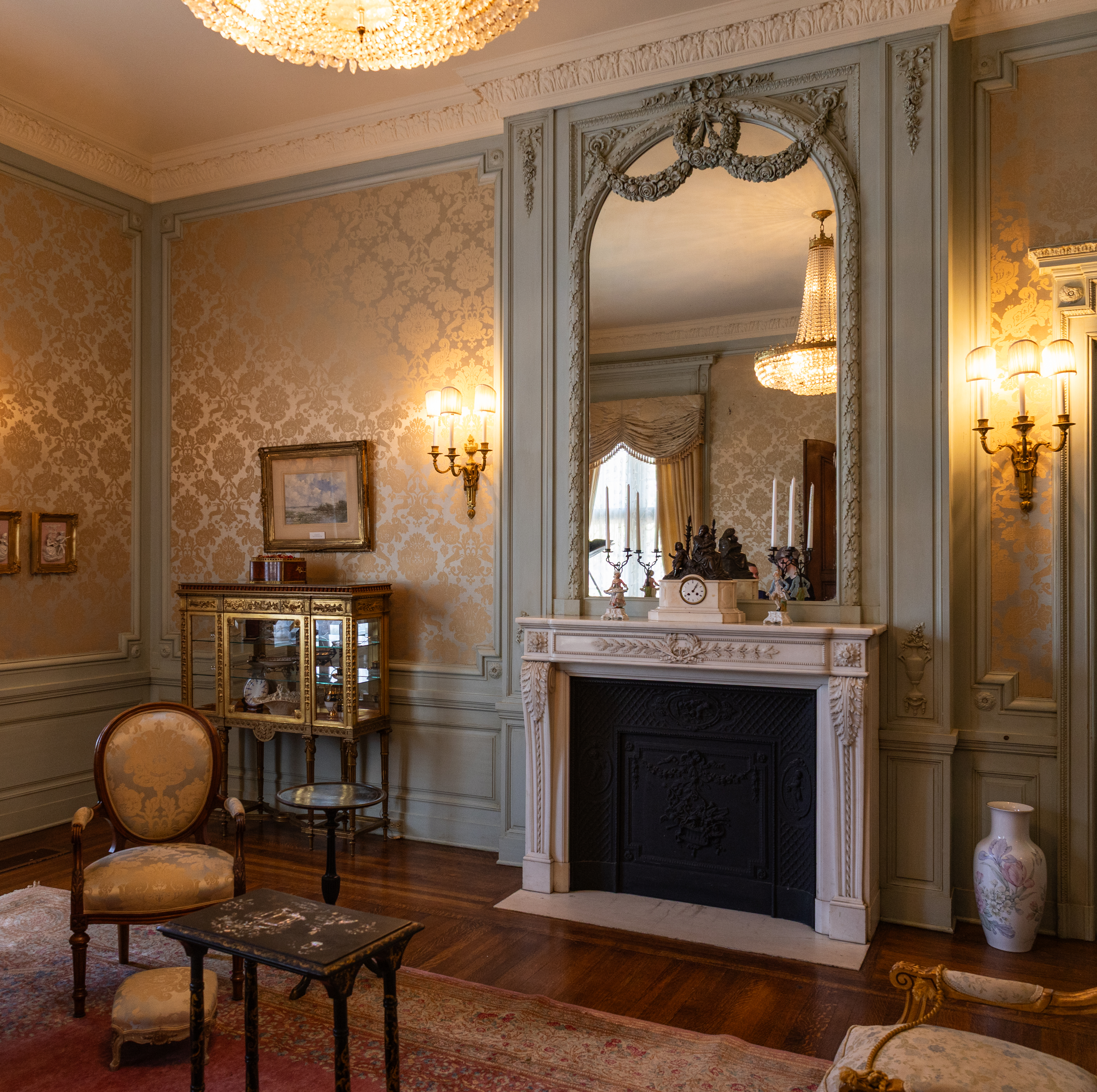
The drawing room

Willistead Manor was designed by renowned architect Albert Kahn in the 16th-century Tudor-Jacobean style of an English manor house. It was built between 1904 and 1906, using grey limestone quarried outside of Amherstburg and worked by Scottish stonemasons.

The building was commissioned by Edward Chandler Walker, the second son of Hiram Walker. It is named after the first son, Willis Walker, a lawyer in Detroit, Michigan, who died young. Contrary to popular belief, Hiram Walker never lived in the home. Edward and his wife never had any children. After Edward died in 1915, his wife Mary moved out of the house and she eventually moved back to the United States, deeding the house and grounds to the town of Walkerville in 1921.

When Walkerville was amalgamated with Windsor in 1935, it obtained ownership of Willistead. In the years after its use as a residence, Willistead served as the Walkerville Town Hall, Art Gallery of Windsor and as a public library branch. In the late 1970s early 1980s, the City of Windsor, afraid of the repairs and upkeep on the mansion, wanted to demolish the structure. Preservationists stepped in and the home was saved. In 1976, Windsor City Council designated Willistead Manor and Park as a heritage property through Bylaw 5334. A memorial garden on the grounds was dedicated to Paul Martin, a member of parliament who served several cabinet roles, in 1996.

Today the manor is used as a banquet hall, and the grounds are incorporated in a larger public park. The house can be rented for occasions such as weddings, corporate meeting and private parties. The house is also decorated for the Christmas holiday.
