= Rum-running in Windsor, Ontario =

Alcohol smuggling in 20th century Canada

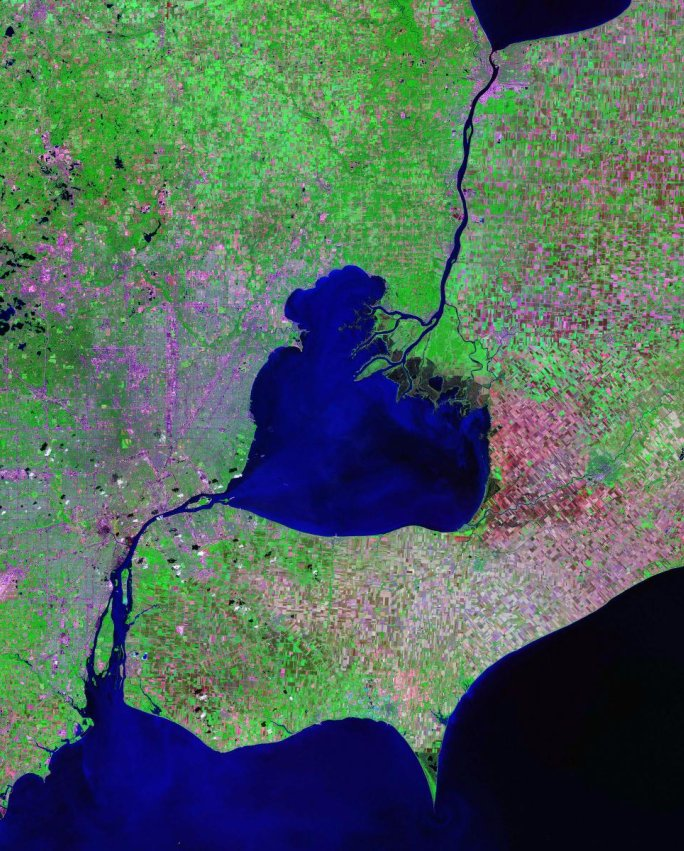
The many islands of the Detroit River made smuggling between Windsor and Detroit difficult to detect during Prohibition.

The Canadian city of Windsor, Ontario and the United States city of Detroit, Michigan, are located on opposite banks of the Detroit River. The river separates them by about 0.6 kilometres (0.37 miles) at the narrowest point, but there were no bridges between the two cities until 1929.

In 1916, the State of Michigan banned the sale of alcohol, followed three years later by nationwide prohibition. Windsor became a major site for rum-running — alcohol smuggling — and gang activity.

The Canadian federal government regulated the manufacturing, importation, and exportation of alcoholic beverages in all the provinces. When the Wartime Prohibition Act, which prohibited the manufacturing, sale, or consumption of alcoholic beverages expired on January 1, 1920, new legislation authorized each province to decide whether to continue the enforced bans on alcohol. Like most provinces in Canada, Ontario chose to continue to ban the production and sale of alcohol. This decision led to an upswing in organized crime activity along the Detroit-Windsor borders.

== The Eighteenth Amendment, Volstead Act and near beer ==
On January 16, 1919, the American Government passed the Eighteenth Amendment to the United States Constitution. It had three sections:

Section 1. After one year from the ratification of this article the manufacture, sale, or transportation of intoxicating liquors within, the importation thereof into, or the exportation thereof from the United States and all territory subject to the jurisdiction thereof for beverage purposes is hereby prohibited.

Section 2. The Congress and the several States shall have concurrent power to enforce this article by appropriate legislation.

Section 3. This article shall be inoperative unless it shall have been ratified as an amendment to the Constitution by the legislatures of the several States, as provided in the Constitution, within seven years from the date of the submission hereof to the States by the Congress.

Congressman Andrew John Volstead was one of the main promoters of the Eighteenth Amendment. The Volstead Act of 1920 defined intoxicating liquor as any liquor containing more than 0.5% alcohol. It permitted the manufacture of non-intoxicating cider and fruit juices for home use, as well as permitting households to ferment wine for private consumption; and it allowed the sale of alcoholic beverages for medicinal, sacramental, and industrial purposes. The Volstead Act allowed breweries to produce "near beer" with an alcohol content of up to 0.5%. To make the near beer, distilleries produced beer and then let it sit to allow most of its alcoholic content to evaporate. This allowed breweries to produce virtually unlimited amounts of beer. Even though Ontario had their own prohibition, called the Ontario Temperance Act, which lasted from 1916 through 1927, it was still legal to manufacture and export alcohol. This loophole led to a great deal of alcohol smuggling via the Detroit River between Windsor and Detroit, the largest U.S. city on the Canada–U.S. border.

== "Joe sent me" ==
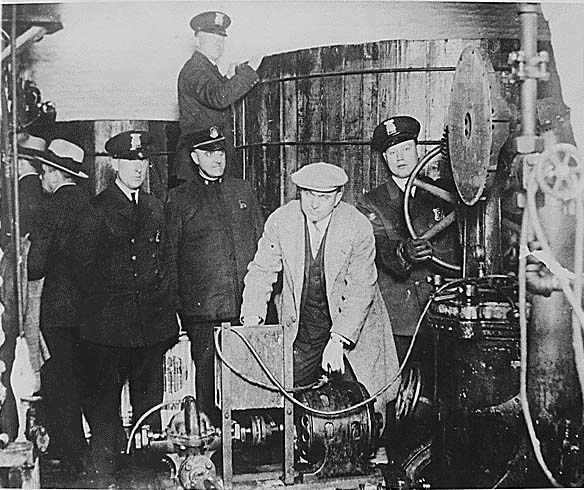
Detroit police inspecting equipment found in a clandestine underground brewery during the Prohibition era

The popular saying, "Joe sent me", was used to gain entry to speakeasies, blind pigs, clubs or joints. By 1928, there were from 16,000 to 25,000 speakeasies and clubs in the Windsor-Detroit area, located in slums as well as in some of Detroit's most prestigious neighborhoods. Popular drinks of the time varied depending on the club, distinguishing one club from another. Criminal gangs either owned the clubs or protected from police and other gangs.

Some clubs and speakeasies offered food, at times for free with the purchase of a beverage to encourage customers during prohibition. Police were often bribed to protect against raids, however, they would intervene if a club was prone to violence or cases of food poisoning.

The lure of speakeasies during prohibition is not difficult to understand. Gambling played a significant role — slot machines, poker, blackjack, and roulette were popular in higher-class blind pigs — giving clubs a social and economic benefit. The commonly accepted attitude and minimal penalties for drinking were not much of a deterrent. The thrill of violating prohibition laws appealed to the young, who were rarely embarrassed to have their names in the paper. Blind pigs generally went unnoticed, although those near churches and schools were often targeted. Drinking on campuses was usually concentrated among sororities and fraternities. The Volstead Act allowed people to obtain liquor for "medicinal purposes" by a physician's prescription, this often was then diluted and sold for huge profits.

Many Americans came to Windsor to enjoy a good time while drinking. There were several places for Americans to drink and party simply by crossing the Detroit River, including roadhouses. One of the most popular was the Island View Hotel, off the shore of the Detroit River with its own dock. Today, Island View Hotel known as Abars, is closed and the building was torn down.

== Drys vs. Wets ==
The term "Drys" referred to those who were in favor of prohibition, who were generally well-financed and organized, and included figures such as Billy Sunday, organized civic groups, some religious denominations, and many leaders of the Progressive movement which also supported social causes such as women's suffrage. Supporters of prohibition argued that it helped the American family, churches, schools, workers, and the American political system. The losers, in this view, were seen as criminals, drunks and corrupt politicians.

The "Wets" were those who opposed prohibition and were, for the most part, poorly organized, especially in the early years. Saloon keepers, brewers, and distillers were viewed as corrupting influences, and many people who enjoyed consuming alcohol in private were constrained from doing so, or supporting its legal use, by social, political, or religious considerations in public.

The entrance of the United States into World War I provided opportunities to win broader support for prohibition. Rationing was widely accepted as a necessary ingredient of the American war effort. The use of grain for alcohol production, which could otherwise have been used in the production of necessary agricultural products, was seen as wasteful.

== Methods ==
Rum runners found several ways to smuggle alcohol from Windsor to Detroit. One of the most significant methods was for large vessels docked in Windsor on the Detroit River to have documentation for South America, but would then simply drop off its shipments in Detroit. The only stipulation being a B-13 clearance document had to be issued from federal customs officials with the destination stamped on it. For example, rum runners would unload a boxcar into a boat at the docks in Windsor. The boat driver would have a permit, stamped by a bribed customs officer, allowing him to export his cargo to Venezuela. Instead of Venezuela, the driver would simply take his cargo to Detroit. A day's work could net the driver approximately $200. Harry Low was one of the first people to take full advantage of this opportunity by purchasing large vessels to deliver alcohol to Michigan while having papers saying his shipments were to Cuban or West Indian ports. Rocco Perri, a bootlegger from Hamilton, Ontario, also sold trainloads of liquor into Detroit and Chicago through Niagara Falls and Windsor.

In wintertime, when the Detroit River froze, rum runners drove across the river, often taking lighter cars with smaller engines. These lighter vehicles were called "whiskey sixes" by the smugglers because of the vehicle's six-cylinder engine.

Criminal gangs developed sophisticated methods to signal across the border to avoid raids and arrests; timed like clockwork, one group arranged the purchase of liquor on Windsor's docks while another team transported it across. A third team would transport it to a warehouse where a final team organized the distribution. Gangs with strong financial backing would often bribe federal, state, and local officials. Eventually airplanes were used after the prohibition navy became effective, and railways were also used extensively. Railways were responsible for around 800 cases of beer daily. Customs officers noticed that after the Volstead Act there was a sharp increase in the application of motorboat licenses.

There were not a lot of locally organized groups involved with rum running, but The Purple Gang was one, dealing with criminal activity from Grosse Pointe to Wyandotte. The Purple Gang's main rivals were the Licavoli Squad, who ran their smuggling operations on the upper Detroit River, virtually seizing control over the bigger east side businesses in the city. The Purple Gang became a major supplier to Al Capone and his Chicago Empire. The Purple Gang fell in 1929 after many leaders were either arrested or murdered.

Italian mafiosi (Licavoli, Vitali, and Giannolo families; see more at Detroit Partnership) divided the waterways into sections and if crossed, all-out warfare would follow. Gangs were financially stable and it allowed them to control state officials and police. They would hire anyone to transport alcohol: families, men, women, and young teenagers.

== Blaise Diesbourg ==
Blaise Diesbourg, also known as "King Canada," was a major figure in the liquor smuggling and bootlegging business around Windsor during the American prohibition period. His success brought him in contact with Al Capone, who arranged a deal with Diesbourg to supply him with the regular shipment of booze by plane. Diesbourg took the name "King Canada" at this time as an alias to hide from legal authorities.

Due to the ease and proximity of smuggling across the Detroit River to the United States, it was an obvious choice for Diesbourg to expand his operations across the border. Farming or fishing wages of $35 a month could not compete with monthly rum-running salaries of $400 a month for a captain. Seventy-five percent of all illegal liquor brought into the United States was transported across the Detroit River from Canada, mainly along the thirty-five mile stretch from Lake Erie to the St. Clair River. In fact, the city's two major industries during this time were the manufacturing of automobiles and the distribution of Canadian liquor.

King Canada would smuggle liquor into the United States either by ship or plane, as well as used cars across the frozen Detroit River during the winter. He was one of the few bootleggers to utilize planes in his smuggling operations.

== Harry Low ==
Harry Low was one of Windsor's most famous rum runners during the prohibition era, leaving behind one of Windsor's most treasured historic sites Devonshire Lodge. Low was a machinist by trade and worked in the industry for many years before opening up his own pool hall on Sandwich Street (now Riverside Drive) in Windsor. As prohibition came to fruition in the 1920s, Low witnessed an opportunity to make quick money by smuggling booze from Windsor, Ontario. Low borrowed $300 from a friend to help him along with setting up a bootlegging business for his pool hall customers. Through the profits he made from this operation he was able to close his pool hall and move on to bigger bootlegging businesses, starting small by running liquor from Windsor across the Detroit River into Detroit. This proved to be so successful that soon Low had to purchase two cargo ships, most notable of which was the World War I minesweeper named The Vedas, which was used mostly for the movement of alcohol from Montreal to the docks of Windsor.

With all of his accomplishments, there were also downfalls. In 1928, Carling Brewery, which Low was CEO of at the time, was sued by the Government of Canada for tax evasion. Low and his associates were also linked to the murder of a former employee whose body was found in southern Michigan near the Ohio state line. By the end of the Great Depression most of Low's fortune had dried up in legal fees fighting charges in both Canada and the United States, as well as investing in his own promotions company, which ultimately failed. Low came full circle when he returned to Quebec to work as a toolmaker in a shipyard, leaving his now failed empire behind him in Windsor. He would eventually return to Windsor, where he died in 1955 at the Hotel Dieu Hospital.

== Outcome ==
Customs officers and police officials were overwhelmed by the smuggling; not only by the sheer number of people engaged in it, but also due to a miscalculation regarding Canada's commitment. The prohibition enforcement agencies lacked organization and smugglers often had better routes and better technology than the police. The police responded by introducing new equipment. Once the "prohibition navy" was established, rum runners began using aircraft. Canada was reluctant to close distilleries because of tax revenues and the potential loss of thousands of jobs, thus making alcohol easily available.

The American government had several agencies attempting to stop smuggling from happening along the Detroit River. There was the Detroit Border Patrol, the Detroit Police, the Federal Prohibition Bureau, as well as other forces. The Detroit Border patrol was not very successful in their attempts to stop alcohol smuggling. The Federal Prohibition Bureau claimed that four-fifths of the nation's supply of contraband alcohol came from Detroit. At the start of prohibition the American forces trying to stop rum-running to Detroit were very impotent. But by 1922, they developed a powerful speedboat loaded with heavy weaponry, which would be the beginning of the "prohibition navy."

The United States was growing tired of the violence involved with smuggling; the unemployment rate was a staggering 46% in 1931. In 1933 it was argued that the legalization of liquor would reduce crime, lawlessness, and gangs. The 18th amendment was repealed by the 21st amendment on December 5, 1933.

== References and further reading ==
- Davis, Mark C. (1985). "Atlantic Canada's Rum Running Tradition." Acadiensis 14 (2): 147–56.
- Gervais, C. H. (Marty). (1980) The Rumrunners: A Prohibition Scrapbook. Thornhill, Ont: Firefly Books. pages 51–63.
- Mason, Philip P. (1995). Rumrunning and the Roaring Twenties: Prohibition on the Michigan-Ontario Waterway. Detroit: Wayne State University Press. ISBN 0814325831
- Rennie, Gary. (9 September 2010). "'Grand Bend' visions for Belle River; Councillor sees tourism possibilities." The Windsor Star, A5.
- Spence, B. H. (1923). "Prohibitory Legislation in Canada," Annals of the American Academy of Political and Social Science, 109: 230–64.
