= Canadian Club =

Brand of Canadian whisky

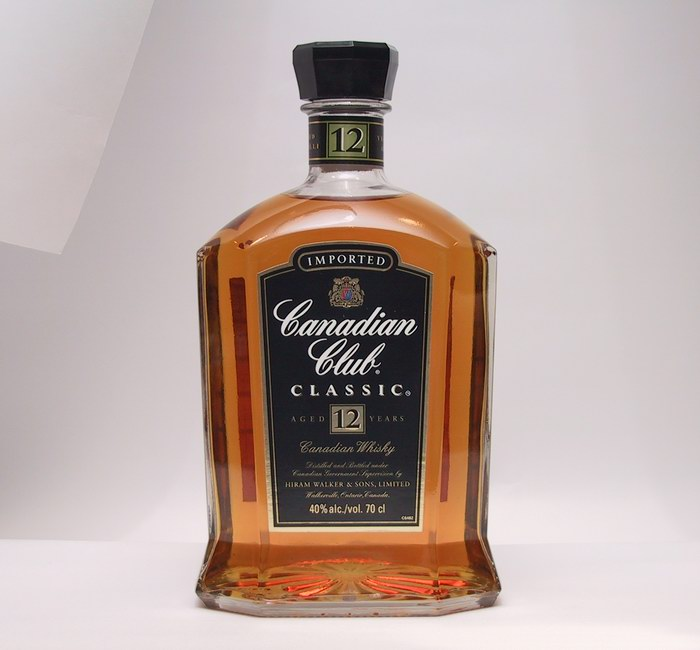
- Canadian Club
- Type: Canadian whisky
- Manufacturer: Suntory Global Spirits (2011–present): Hiram Walker & Sons 1854–1926; Hiram Walker-Gooderham & Worts Limited 1926–1987; Allied Domecq 1987–2005; Fortune Brands 2005–2011 (sold by Pernod Ricard in 2005)
- Origin: Canada
- Introduced: 1858
- Proof (US): 80
- Website: canadianclub.com

Canadian Club (French: Club Canadien) is a brand of Canadian whisky produced by Suntory Global Spirits. Popularly known as CC, Canadian Club was created by Hiram Walker and Sons, an evolution of a brand around a product that took place over the second half of the nineteenth century. Hiram Walker merged with Gooderham & Worts, Ltd. in 1926, yielding Hiram Walker-Gooderham & Worts, Ltd.

== History ==
Hiram Walker founded his distillery in 1858 in Detroit. He first learned how to distill cider vinegar in his grocery store in the 1830s before moving on to whisky and producing his first barrels in 1854. However, with the Prohibition movement gathering momentum and Michigan already becoming "dry," Walker decided to move his distillery across the Detroit River to Windsor, Ontario. From here, he was able to export his whisky and start to develop Walkerville, a model community that Walker financed to provide housing and services for his employees.

Walker's whisky was particularly popular in the late 19th century gentlemen's clubs of the United States and Canada; hence it became known as "Club Whisky." Walker originally positioned the whisky as a premium liquor, pitching it not only on its smoothness and purity but also its five-year oak barrel aging.

Club Whisky became very popular and American distillers petitioned for the inclusion of the word "Canada" on the bottle to distinguish it from their competing whiskies, thinking it would hamper the popularity of Walker's. This backfired, only making Club Whisky more exclusive. Walker saw this and changed the label again in 1889 adding the word "Canadian" to the top of the label, distinguishing Walker's recipe for his whisky from the other processes of the time. In 1890, the word "Canadian" was moved down from the top of the label and incorporated into the name of the whisky.

Walker's distillery passed to his sons upon his death in 1899. At one point, the Walkers employed almost the entire population of Walkerville, where they built police and fire stations, brought in running water and installed street lights. In 1890, the Canadian government acknowledged Walkerville as a legal town. It was incorporated into Windsor in 1935.

During the years of Prohibition, one of the distillery's most important clients was Chicago gangster Al Capone, who smuggled in thousands of cases of Canadian Club via a route from Windsor to Detroit.

Canadian Club has received the royal warrants of Queen Victoria, Edward VII, George V, George VI, and Elizabeth II. Hiram Walker & Sons is the only North American distiller to have been granted a royal warrant.

The Walker distillery remains in production in Windsor. Canadian Club is now part of the Jim Beam portfolio. It is its number four–selling alcoholic product, behind Jim Beam bourbon whiskey, Sauza Tequila, and DeKuyper cordials.

During the Whisky War between Canada and Denmark, Canadian Club was the usual bottle left by the Canadians.

== Advertising ==
=== "Hide A Case" campaigns ===
In 1967, Hiram Walker & Sons launched their "Hide A Case" advertising campaign that enticed drinkers to seek out cases of Canadian Club hidden at exotic locations throughout the world, including Mount Kilimanjaro, Angel Falls, Mount St. Helens and the Swiss Alps. The campaign hid a total of 22 cases, and would release clues in their advertising between then and 1981. As of 2024, 16 of the 22 cases have been found; hunters would often receive media attention when they managed to locate one. These include:

- 1968 — David and Diana Mattoon redirect their honeymoon to travel to Venezuela and find one underneath Angel Falls.
- 1969 — A group of boy scouts stumble across the Yukon case before the ad had been published. A second case was therefore hidden elsewhere in the Yukon which remains unaccounted for.
- 1977 — A case on Mount Kilimanjaro is accidentally found by Dutch journalist Peter Juul.
- 1978 — John Blewett locates one in a skyscraper in Manhattan in a race contested by thousands of hunters.
- 1979 — A group of prawn fishermen find the Great Barrier Reef case which was hidden in 1968.
- 2010 — Kristina Beall locates the Tonga case.

The 2010 hunt for the Tonga case was part of a brief revival of the campaign by the company, which offered a $100,000 cash prize to anyone who could locate it. A contest was held and eight consumers were flown from the US and Canada to the Tonga to hunt for the case. It remains the most recent discovery; the other 15 were all found before 1980. The purchase of the brand by Suntory Global Spirits in 2011 ended the advertising campaign, potentially over legal concerns with encouraging consumers to travel to remote and sometimes dangerous locations. The company indicated that they had no plans to revive the campaign in 2018.

The six unrecovered cases are in Yukon Territory, Loch Ness, Robinson Crusoe Island, Tanzania, the North Pole, and Lake Placid. Local liquor store owner Tim Robinson searched for the Lake Placid case unsuccessfully in 2020. He took Whisky Advocate on a tour of the site later that year- suspecting that the case may have sunk into the swampy terrain in the intervening decades. He was still searching occasionally as of 2023, having also made contact with a local who recalled the visit from the company when they hid it in 1979. The North Pole case is likely impossible to find given decades of ice movement and snowfall, it may be lost deep below the ice.

The missing cases were a plot point in the horror fiction podcast Welcome to Night Vale in 2017. A short story arc was focused on a fictitious case hidden at Night Vale Radio.

=== Other campaigns ===
A print ad for the drink would serve as inspiration for the pre-title sequence of the 1977 Bond movie, The Spy Who Loved Me.

In the 2007 IndyCar Series season, they were the main sponsor for Andretti Green Racing #27 driver, Dario Franchitti during their championship winning season, which also included winning the 2007 Indianapolis 500.

Canadian Club was a frequent product placement in the AMC show Mad Men, often being the drink of choice for the main character Don Draper.

== Types ==
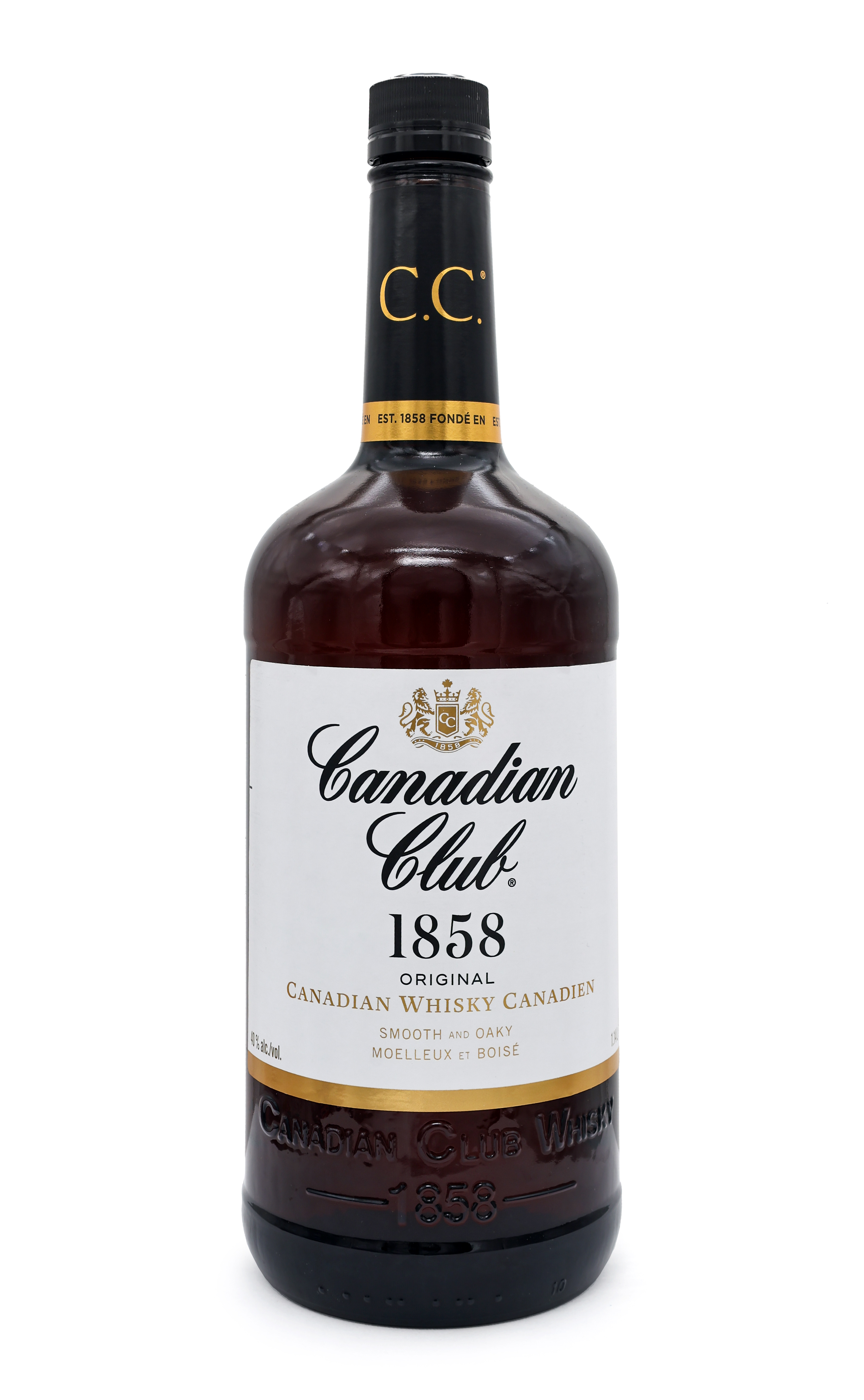
Bottle of Canadian Club 1858

Canadian Club whisky comes in seven versions, and as a straight rye. All are 80 proof (40% alcohol by volume) except where noted otherwise.

- Canadian Club 1858

The base version, does not carry an age statement. Sold in more than 150 countries, it is the most popular line of Canadian Club and is often used as a mixer. In Australia and New Zealand it is 74 proof (37% abv).

- Canadian Club Reserve

Aged 9 years.

- Canadian Club Classic

Aged 12 years.

- Canadian Club 100% Rye

Crafted entirely from single-grain rye.

- Canadian Club Apple

Canadian Club 1858 with added apple flavour.

- Canadian Club Dock No. 57

Canadian Club 1858 with added blackberry flavour.

- Canadian Club Mixed & Ready

Launched in Australia in April 2001, Canadian Club Mixed & Ready is a ready-to-drink (RTD) mix consisting of a 4.8% ABV pre-mixed blend of six-year-old Canadian Club with dry ginger ale, cola, soda and lime, or lemon crush. It is sold in 330 mL bottles and 375 mL cans. All flavours are also available in New Zealand. An Australian advertising campaign to pitch Canadian Club to those who were "over beer" was hugely successful, and launched internationally.

6% ABV "Premium Strength" is available only in 375mL cans and is mixed with dry ginger ale.

=== Limited edition / Discontinued ===
- Canadian Club Premium
- Canadian Club Reserve

Aged 10 years.

- Canadian Club Limited Edition

Aged 20 years.

- Canadian Club Chronicles 41, 42, 43, 44 and 45

Aged 41, 42, 43, 44 or 45years.

- Canadian Club 100 Proof

Aged six years and bottled at 100 proof (50% abv).

- Canadian Club Sherry Cask

Double-matured, first in white oak barrels for at least eight years; then casks from the Sherry wine region (Spain). It is 82.6-proof (41.3% abv).

Canadian Club is also produced in limited quantities in older agings (15 years and up) for special markets. For the whisky's 150th anniversary in 2008, a 30-year-old version was released in a very limited bottling.

== See also ==
- Gooderham and Worts Distillery
- Hiram Walker
- Harry C. Hatch
- Distilled beverage
