= Hiram Walker =

American entrepreneur (1816-1899)

- Hiram Walker, in a painting that hangs in Willistead Manor, Windsor, Ontario
- Born: July 4, 1816; East Douglas, Massachusetts, U.S.
- Died: January 12, 1899 (aged 82); Detroit, Michigan, U.S.
- Known for: Founder of Canadian Club whisky
- Spouse: Mary Abigail Williams (m. 1846)

Signature
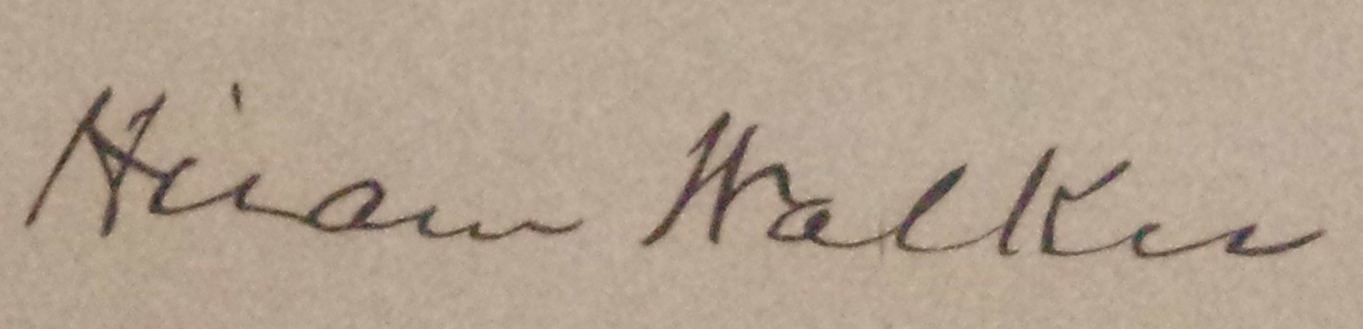

Hiram Walker (July 4, 1816 – January 12, 1899) was an American entrepreneur and founder of the Hiram Walker and Sons Ltd. distillery in Windsor, Ontario, Canada. He was born in East Douglas, Massachusetts, and moved to Detroit in 1838. He purchased land across the Detroit River, just east of what is Windsor, Ontario, and established a distillery in 1858 in what would become Walkerville, Ontario. He began selling his whisky as Hiram Walker's Club Whisky, in containers that were "clearly marked". He used a process to make his whisky that was vastly different from all other distillers.

It became very popular, angering American distillers, who forced the US government to pass a law requiring that all foreign whiskeys state their country of origin on the label. From this point forward, Hiram Walker's Canadian Club whisky was Canada's top export whisky. He established and maintained the company town that grew around his distillery, exercising planning and control over every facet of the town, from public works to religious services to police and fire control.

The Hiram Walker & Sons Distillery remained in the Walker family until 1926 when they sold it to Harry C. Hatch for $15,000,000, equivalent to $272,791,353 in 2025. While the company has gone through several owners and is now part of Pernod Ricard, the Canadian Club brand is owned by Suntory Global Spirits, a subsidiary of Suntory Holdings of Japan. Canadian Club whisky is still produced at the distillery site Walker founded.

== Early life ==
Hiram Walker was born on July 4, 1816, on a family farm in Douglas, Massachusetts. He was the sixth generation of English immigrants; his father was a reputable schoolmaster. His ancestors can be traced back to Thomas Walker of Boston, who emigrated to America from England. His father died when he was aged 9. Douglas, Massachusetts was a small town, with a population of 1,800, and very few businesses, which include a planing mill, a machine shop, cotton factory and forge. He received a "common" school education in Boston, and began working as a dry goods clerk. He left for Detroit, Michigan, in 1838, at the age of 22 years. Detroit was a vast change from Boston at the time, as Detroit had a smaller population, where Walker was able to find employment. His first employment in Detroit was as a grocery clerk at a store owned by Augustus Gardner, east of Woodward Avenue. His general tasks were to order, receive, check and price out all the goods in which the company dealt. Through this, he gained knowledge and experience of the business world. At this time, Boston was the major metropolis of New England. Walker, as well as many other youthful New Englanders, were drawn to the opportunity of the midwest and beyond, largely due to the expansion and development of the railway.

== Marriage and family ==
On October 5, 1846, at age thirty, Walker married Mary Abigail Williams. Mary Williams and Hiram Walker had seven children, five boys and two girls, but one of the girls died at age 13.

His wife was the daughter of Ephraim Smith Williams and Hannah Melissa Gotee of Silver Lake, Michigan. Mary Abigail, like Walker, was the descendant of new England pioneers, whose familial roots traced back to Massachusetts in 1638. On her mother's side, Mary Abigail was the descendant of French merchants.

He had two daughters, Julia Elizabeth and Jennie Melissa, and five sons, Willis Ephraim, Edward Chandler, Franklin Hiram, Alfred (infant), and James Harrington. Edward Chandler, his second son, commissioned the development of Willistead Manor.

== Adult life ==
Throughout his life, Walker remained an American citizen. For a period of five years from 1859 until 1864, he lived in Windsor in a residence named the "Cottage" on land that was part of the Labadie holdings which Walker originally purchased. The "Cottage", a large home for the period, had a third story as well as a large verandah.

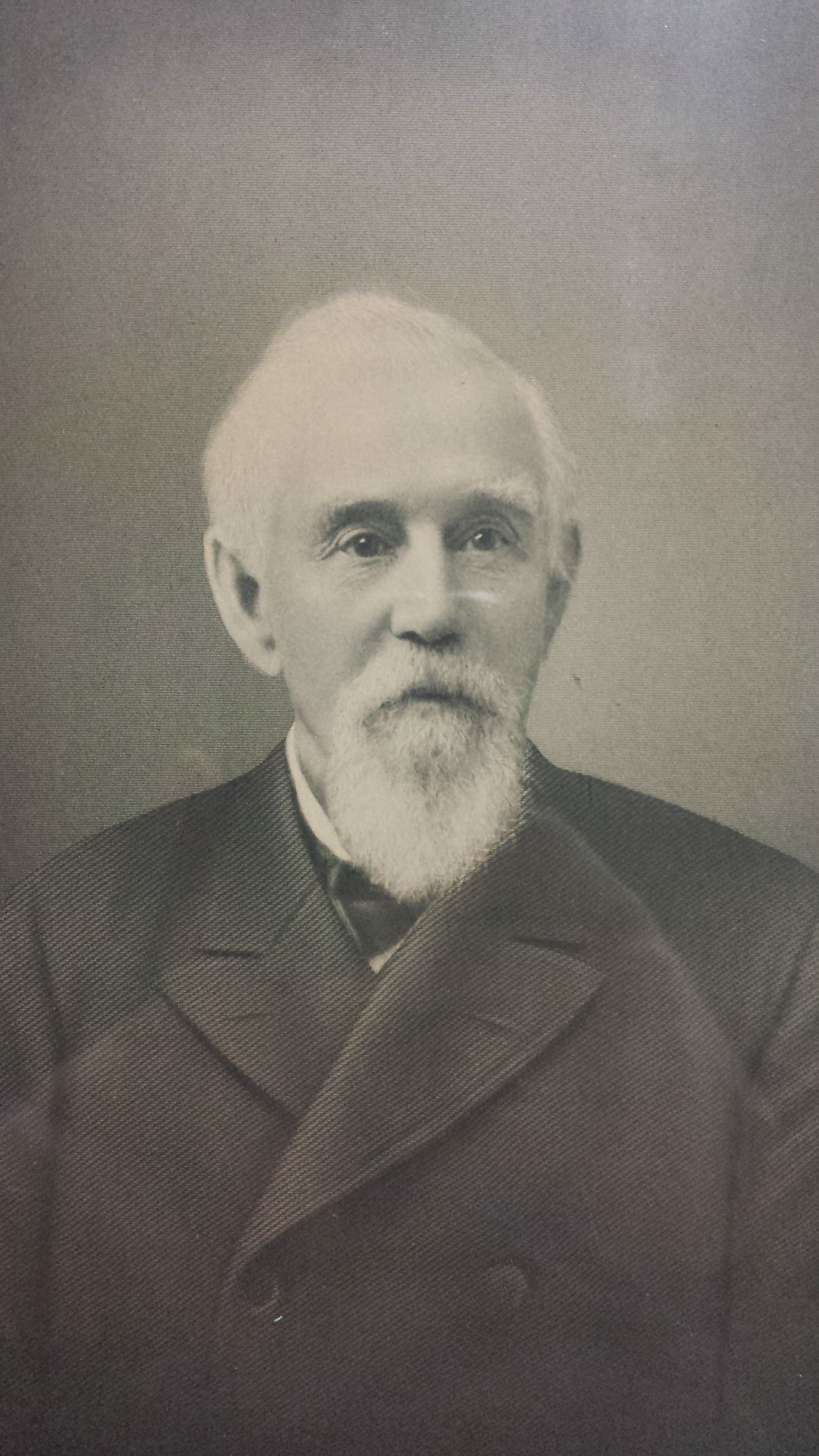
Hiram Walker, from a picture located in the archives of Hiram Walker and Sons

== Business history ==
=== Early years ===
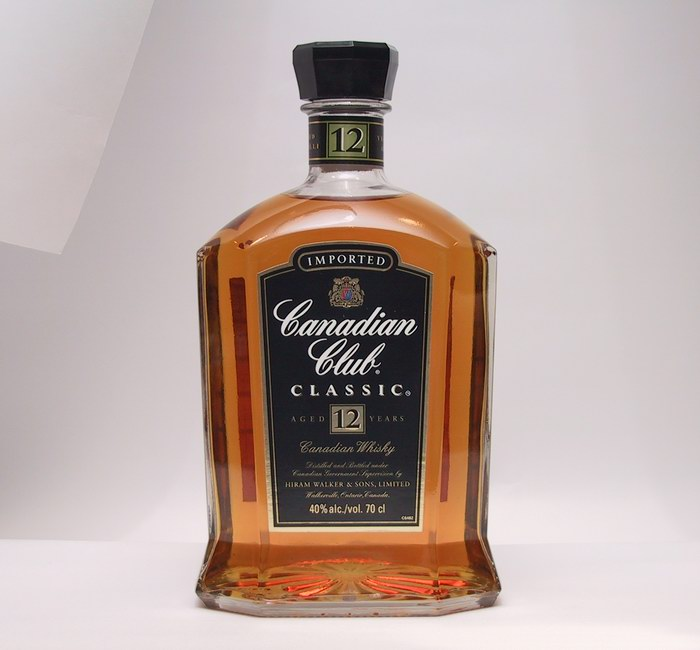
Canadian Club whisky, originally made by Hiram Walker & Sons, today a property of Suntory Global Spirits

Walker was not new to the world of business. Since his migration to Detroit he had been involved in several different projects. In his earlier days he worked as a grocery clerk from 1838 until 1845 for several different employers. Eventually, after being involved in the grocery business for several years, he took it upon himself to begin operating a grocery store of his own in 1846 which did not last. Following his work as a clerk, Walker was employed at the firm of Ingersoll and Kirby, a leather and leather goods business. Through this, he gained his first knowledge into the business world. By 1845, he had saved enough money as a clerk to invest in a business, the firm of Walker and Parker, which specialized in tanning and leather sales. However, this partnership dissolved in 1846, and Walker returned to the grocery business. The tannery business burned down in 1848.

Walker was well-regarded as a proficient businessman, noted for his involvement in a wide range of different businesses and industries. Some associate his success with his ability to dabble in multiple business opportunities as well as jump quickly on prospective businesses. This can be seen, for example, during his grocery business between 1849 and 1858 when Walker had the idea to produce his own vinegar. His beginnings in the distillery business have been traced to January 1849, where an advertisement in a Detroit newspaper publicized Walker's "barrels of cider vinegar" and "wheat whisky". It was advertised for 10 cents per gallon. Through this business, he began to distill his own vinegar, which became popular in the area because of its consistency, low price, and high quality. He then sold it at his grocery store, to other grocers as well as across the River in Windsor via door-to-door sales. Thus, the vinegar factory became another successful business venture for Walker which, after years of success in Detroit, he sold in 1858.

It is true that it was the manufacturing of vinegar led to Walker's eventual shift to the manufacturing of whisky. However, he had been selling alcohol since 1849 and continued to at the time he actually began to distill. He also was involved in the grain business, through serving as a supplier to the local flour mills in the Detroit area.

=== Development of Walker's distillery ===
Through his work in the grocery business, as well as his cider and wheat sales, he had nearly $40,000 saved, which he then used to purchase additional space in Detroit and inexpensive land across the Detroit River, in what is now Windsor, Ontario, in order to expand his business. He did have interest in distilling his own liquor, but at the time, there were strict prohibition laws which prevented him from doing so. Walker distilled his first barrel of whisky in 1854, despite the instability of prohibition laws. After 5 years of distilling in Detroit he ended that particular business there.

Walker was considered one of the largest landowners in Ontario, and over his entire lifetime, his land possessions measured around 10,000 acre, most of which along the Walkerville and Detroit River Railroad. The location of Walker's property, on what was originally considered part of the Labdie farm, was extremely valuable because the Great Western Railway was in close proximity and enabled Walker to move products from his distillery and cattle yards.

Whisky makers before Walker ran spirits and whisky through charcoal, until around 1855, but Walker's method of utilizing a barrel to "create colour" and a pleasing flavor was unprecedented.

A huge demand for Walker's whisky and flour originated through the Civil War. It was at this time, that smuggling became common via the Detroit River. There is a legend that Walker built a "liquor pipeline" under the Detroit River for smuggling purposes.

Being an entrepreneur, Walker looked at every venture possible, to expand his business. Since Detroit was only a boat-ride across the river to Windsor, Canada, he began to weigh his options in expanding into foreign territory. Canada had much to offer entrepreneurs and business risktakers. The population was increasing gradually, communications were advancing, and real estate was cheaper compared to that from across the river. Labor and materials also cost less in Canada than in the States. Walker looked into expanding to Canada. With the expansion of America through the Great Western Railroad, trade opportunities opened up for businessmen like Walker. He ventured into Canada across the border from Detroit into what is currently known as Essex County. At this time, the population in this area was considerably smaller than that of Detroit, consisting of small village settlements under the Township of Sandwich, such as the villages of Windsor and Sandwich. Most of the land in this area was vast farm land.

In 1856, he bought his first piece of land from the Labadie family through grandson Eugene Hall for £300. This transaction took place on December 22, 1856, using the British currency system that Canada was still employing. A month later, on January 24, 1857, he acquired another 300 acres of land for which he paid £750. Also on this day, he purchased another 104 acres for £250. The remainder of 1857 involved building on much of this land. Walker, still a resident of Detroit, often crossed the border to oversee the construction. His plan was to open a steam-powered flour mill, which did not exist in the area, and a distillery, in which he had very little serious competition. He also had his hands in the agricultural industry, with owning cattle and hogs, as well as farming.

In 1857, Walker bought more property near the farm he already owned, increasing his holdings to 468 acres. He began construction of the flour mill and distillery in the same year, which he visited every day during construction even though he still resided in America. He continued his grocery business in the meantime, helping him become the leading commission merchant in Detroit.

The year 1858 marked the completion of the flour mill and distillery that Walker was building in Canada and at this time business could begin. During this time he still maintained his very successful grain business in the United States. The flour that would be produced in his flour mill would prove to be popular not only in Canada but also in the United States and Britain. His introduction of a large steam flouring mill benefited the County of Essex's farming community, which at this time made up most of the population, by encouraging farming practices. Wheat farmers from all around would go and use the flour mill as it gained in popularity.

The distillery was also becoming quite popular with the locals at this time. Mid-summer 1858 marked the opening of Walker's whisky operation. The same process which he had used in Detroit was now used in Windsor to distill his alcohol. Spirits were leached through charcoal, a process widely used at the time.

His Canadian industries quickly took precedence over that of his grain business still located in Detroit. It was because of this that Walker found himself traveling by ferry to Canada from his home in Detroit on a daily basis. This trip was a lengthy process as the ferry that brought him to Canada dropped him off in Windsor, which left a long ride via horse and buggy to his flour mill and distillery. At this time in March 1859, Walker moved to Canada in order to save time traveling to and from his Canadian businesses. He moved out of the home he had been in since 1851 and into a house located near the flour mill, which he altered and called "The Cottage".

The Cottage was a home that previously had been owned by the Labadie family, from whom Walker had purchased much of the land on which his industries were now located. This framed house was built in 1839 and resembled the French style of residences prevalent in the area. Walker made several modifications to the home including two large additions at each end of the home, the addition of a third floor as well as servants dwellings. In the few years that Walker lived in Canada he remained at The Cottage.

The new Canadian business helped spur other ventures for Walker. He tried hog farming for a while, until cholera broke out, when he switched to cattle farming instead.

In 1859, Walker hired John McBride, one of his workers from Detroit, to be his traveling salesman. His job was to solicit orders from vendors who might be interested in purchasing the product. Taken from Walker & Sons Ltd. Archive The year of 1860 saw some of the highest production because both his mill and distillery were running almost non-stop. 1861 and 1862 marked the first years of paying back many expenses and seeing the beginning of profits. Operations became larger and more continuous as farmers, salesmen, and office staff would find themselves very busy. In 1863, Walker made McBride his partner, changing the name of the business to Hiram Walker and Company.

A massive source of profits for Hiram Walker was actually the Civil War in the United States. The U.S dollar plummeted during this time, and Americans turned to smuggling in Canadian beverages. It is reported that Hiram Walker and Company loaded jug after jug of whiskey onto American ferries, carrying them across the Detroit River, leading to Walker making massive profits. Jealous competitors constructed a story of Walker creating a lead pipe that led right from the distillery, under the Detroit River, and into Detroit. By 1863, Walker had named James Ellis in charge of his mill, William McManus as his distiller, and John McBride in charge of managing. While a majority of his business did take place on the Canadian side of the border, he did prefer to live in Detroit. In 1863, he bought a home within Detroit. Walker also attempted to construct and run a vinegar factory in 1864, but was unsuccessful and closed down two years later due to his other commitments. Up until 1865, Walker's distillery was the only one to exist in Essex County, however, Walker found himself with competition with Rolph and Melchers. During this time, Walker's partner McBride was anxious to move up the chain within the company. Two years later, John McBride and two of his friends bought Rolph and Melchers. After discovering what McBride had done, his employment was terminated and Walker lost his business partner. Ironically, McBride and his partners would end up having to sell their property to Walker because they were going out of business and it was operated by Hiram Walker as a second plant until 1876. John McBride would go on to become a tax collector and grocery store owner in Detroit.

=== Involvement with Detroit newspapers ===
Walker became heavily involved with Detroit newspapers during the mid-1860s and 1870s. He bought $10,000 worth of stock in the newspaper known as the Advertiser and Tribune. Their largest competitor of the time was the Daily Post, which proved to be a fierce rival. Walker constantly put forth suggestions of a merger, but his requests were constantly denied. By 1872, Walker purchased another $10,000 in shares, becoming the primary shareholder in the newspaper. The following year, the senior editor of the Advertiser and Tribune had resigned, and Walker immediately bought the stock he had in the company. J.E. Scripps, the former senior editor of the Advertiser and Tribune, soon opened his own newspaper, the Evening News. This divided the competition even further. In 1877, the Advertiser and Tribune merged with the Daily Post under the name the Post and Tribune, as Walker had wanted. Two years later, a fire burned down the offices of the newspaper and Walker was estimated to have lost $30,000. Walker lost interest in the newspaper business soon after and sold the Post and Tribune to James McMillan.

=== Walkerville ===
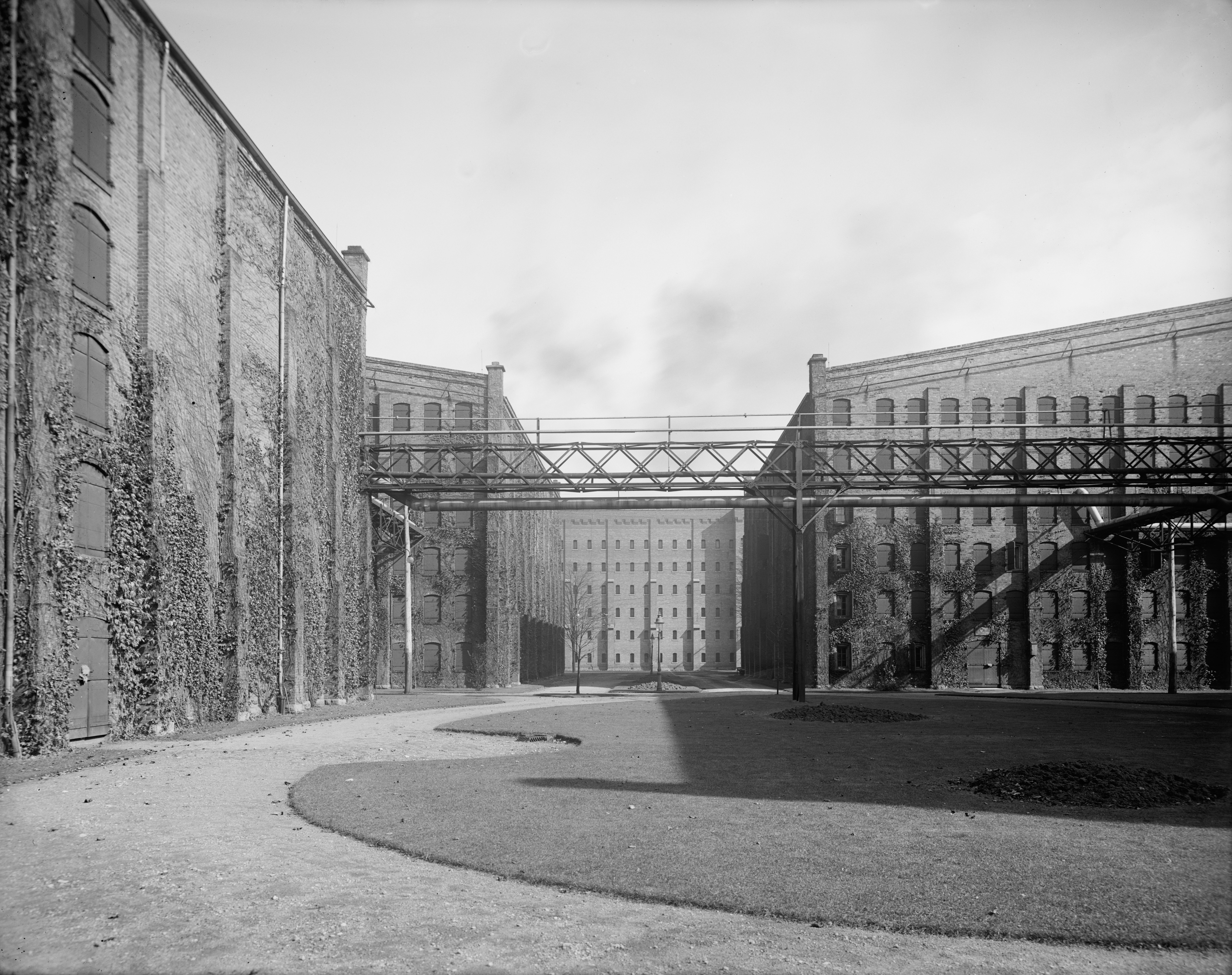
Distillery buildings in Walkerville (now part of Windsor, Ontario) c. 1910

Walker started his milling and distilling business in the town of Sandwich, near Windsor, Ontario. Farmers and other people who worked in Windsor aided Walker with his distilling business. The economic growth that encapsulated the Township of Sandwich started with Walker transforming his property (Labadie Farm) into one with new industrial buildings. These buildings, like the "Walker Mill" and the "Walker Pens" were places people living in the area could bring their wheat and pigs, creating a connection between Walker and his community. Eventually, the name for the section where Walker and his business peaked was called "Walkerton" but there was already a town in the province of Ontario with that name, so Walker and the other citizens settled with "Walkerville" but often referred to it as "Walkers Town".

With the growth of the distillery and the flour mill, Walker expanded the business in many ways. He began to build Walker Road in 1860, and hire many employees, such as salesmen, office workers or skilled trade workers. With this developed an increase in population in the area, especially in respects to it being centralized around the mill and distillery. On March 1, 1869, Walker’s Town established its first post office. This is when the government recognized the small hamlet as the name it is known by today, Walkerville.

Walker is recognized as the man who gave momentum to such aspects that benefited the community like trading, agricultural work, stock raising, building industries, and most importantly, inspired those who surrounded his perseverance and progressive attitudes. Walker build homes for his employees and rented them out at reasonable prices, and also created public utilities, paved the streets, and paid for and encouraged people to get an education. One of the most popular institutions Walker erected was a Methodist church in 1870. It was converted into an Anglican church in 1874, and renamed St. Mary’s, in honor of Walker’s late wife, Mary.

As mentioned, the heart of Walkerville was Walker’s distilling business, "Hiram Walker and Sons" which was established in 1858. Walker’s business created an expansion of the town that included, malt houses, cooperage, copper shop, planning mill, lumber yard, brick yard, and a ferry between Walkerville and Detroit. The trip from his house in Detroit to his businesses in Walkerville took approximately an hour and a half. Due to this, Walker decided to invest in a ferry that would travel between Detroit and Walkerville as to save time and be of assistance to the public. In 1880 he finally decided to rent a ferry that would travel from Detroit and Walkerville. The ferry he would lease was called "The Essex" which was a steam ship built in, 1858 in Walkerville. He installed a dock system on his land in Walkerville that would allow people to board the ferry. In its beginnings the ferry was not very useful for the people of Walkerville as it mainly served as a personal transportation service for Walker himself. It did not follow a set schedule and did not make very many trips on any given day. However, in the following year of 1881, a set schedule was developed and the ferry as a public service began. It was also during this year that another ferry, called "Ariel", replaced "The Essex" due to the termination of the lease.

Furthermore, with the construction of a railway by the Essex and Detroit Railway Company, which ran through Walkerville until Kingsville, encouraged many businesses to move from Windsor to the Township of Walkerville because of transportation opportunities. The amount of new industries and people in Walkerville because of these transportation opportunities led to the creation of good roads that could sustain heavy traffic, traffic lights, police and fire fighters, proper sanitary measures. All of these necessities for a town to properly function could not be afforded by the rural municipality of Sandwich East (what Walkerville was called before its official name) so Hiram Walker and Son’s funded everything. Walker paid for the following: water, 52 fire fighters, the fire appliances, two police officers that rotated shifts, repairs of streets and sidewalks, the night watch service, and the electric lighting of the streets, the Music Hall, the Anglican Church, and some privately owned houses. Walker’s efforts to make Walkerville a legitimate town, no weaker than any other, led to his title as Walkerville’s mayor. Walker created a town council that included, the mayor (Walker), councilors, clerks, treasurers, medical health officers, collectors, assessors, auditors, solicitors, and the chief of police and policeman. The town council’s first meeting was held May 12, 1890, in a building near Walker Road, owned by Walker and Sons. The first major act done by the Walkerville’s council was to create an event honoring the efforts of the creator of Walkerville (Walker) that would fall on his birthday, July 4. A bronze emblem was created by New York's Tiffany and Co. that displays three Cossack foragers on horseback returning from an expedition, with an inscription that reads, "Presented to Hiram Walker, on the 74th anniversary of his birthday, by his friends in the County of Essex, a token of respect and gratitude for Hiram’s efforts with the creation of the Town of Walkerville."

The Walkerville community received a large reward in 1890. Through heavy petitioning, especially by the Walker family, the community became an incorporated town. This released the burden of paying for many services from the Walker company. The City of Windsor was developing around this time, and by Walkerville becoming incorporated, it also helped the town ward off annexation with Windsor. Walkerville became a town on April 7, 1890. In honor of the incorporation and in gratitude to its founder, Walker received a bronze statue made by Tiffany’s. The ceremony took place on Walker’s birthday, July 4, which was declared by town council to be a public holiday.

One of Walkerville’s great concerns was to be annexed with Windsor. The town tried and tried, yet eventually efforts failed and the two communities amalgamated, with Walkerville becoming a neighbourhood near East Windsor. Although Walkerville is a neighbourhood within the larger city limits, it still holds distinct historical significance.

== The Pregnant-Cow Case ==
Walker was also a cattle breeder and was party to a famous contracts case, Sherwood v. Walker, known as "The Pregnant-Cow Case". (33 N.W. 919 (Mich. 1887).) According to the majority opinion, Walker agreed with Theodore Sherwood, a banker, to sell him a cow of distinguished ancestry known as "Rose 2d of Aberlone". The price was $80, both parties believing Rose to be sterile. When Walker discovered that she was pregnant and worth between $750 and $1,000, he refused to deliver her. Sherwood sued and prevailed in the trial court, but lost on appeal. This case illustrates the contract law rules of rescission of contract by mutual mistake. Because both parties believed they were contracting for a sterile cow, there was a mutual mistake of fact, and therefore ground for rescission. However, the dissent in the case, written by unrelated Justice Thomas Sherwood, notes that Theodore Sherwood believed that Rose "might be made to breed" and purchased her on that chance.

== Philanthropy ==
Walker was a charitable man and donated his money throughout Detroit and the Windsor/Walkerville area. Walker spent 25 years in the church of St. Paul’s in Detroit as a vestryman. As a member of the church, he is often remembered for having donated large amounts of money to the parish community and refused to be recognized in any way. He never took any public position within the church, but continued to be the prominent fundraiser in the church for any task the community was trying to accomplish. Walker enjoyed his work within the church, and saw the community as a place that could do a lot of good work. During his time there, he met and befriended all kinds of influential people including other businessmen, doctors, and even judges. In 1874, he donated approximately $5000 worth of bread to families in Walkerville, Windsor, and Detroit. In 1887, Walker made a financial gift to found Children's Hospital of Michigan, part of the Detroit Medical Center. He donated nearly $125,000 to the Children's Free Hospital Association, and undertook the responsibility of constructing a suitable building for the Children's Hospital of Michigan. In Walker's will of 1896, he donated seven eighths of all his Detroit property "of which he might be possessed at the time of his death" to Children's Hospital of Michigan, and the remaining one eighth to Harper Hospital.

Walker built a railway costing him $20,000 because of weak transportation in the South, which had to be approved by the Detroit River Railway Company that eventually led to the laying of the railways steel in 1888. The railway extended from Walkerville, to South Harrow, to the outskirts of Kingsville. The railway had a distance of 27 miles and on April 6, 1888, the Government of Canada granted a subsidy of $118,400, beginning the construction of the railway. The expansion of this railway led to Hiram Walker and Sons business and other businesses being able to branch out as far as Ruthven, further expanding the success of Walker’s distilling company.

He also contributed towards the founding of the Detroit Art Museum.

== Death ==
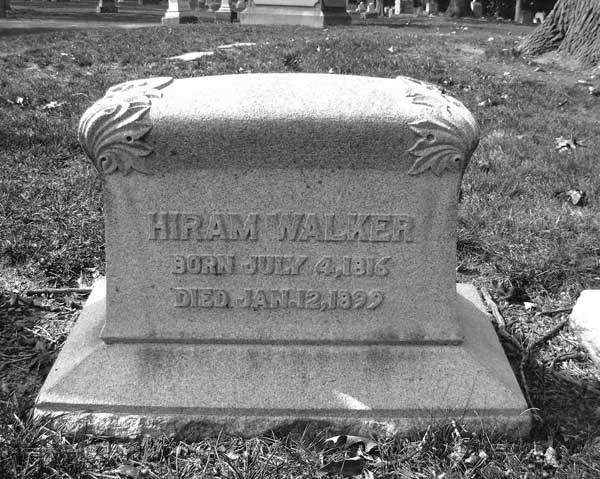
Hiram Walker's Grave, Elmwood Cemetery, Detroit, Michigan

Walker had fallen ill many times since 1883. Due to his illness, he spent a lot of time at home, and on the water in Lake Erie. He often went to an island he owned, known as the Ile Aux Peche, which he sold to his daughter. He lost feeling in his right leg around 1890 due to his rheumatism and walked with a cane. In 1895, he suffered a severe paralytic stroke and lost the feeling in his legs two years later. From April 1898 until his death, he suffered two cases of congestive apoplexy. His second attack was on January 10, 1899. Walker died two days later in Detroit, Michigan, January 12, 1899. He is buried at Elmwood Cemetery in Detroit. His direct descendants are of the Julia Elizabeth (Walker) Buhl, Franklin MacFie Walker and Elizabeth Talman (Walker) Paterson families.

The news of the death of Walker took a large toll on the town. Flags were lowered, and mayor Robert Kerr made a public statement. Walker's casket remained in his residence in Detroit until the funeral took place. The Detroit News reported that family, friends and fellow co-workers visited for hours prior to the funeral service on January 14, 1899. The casket was made entirely of metal, but covered with black and massive floral decorations, which was incredibly rare for the time. The flowers were donated by Hiram Walker & Sons, along with the Children's Free Hospital.

In July 2022, in honor of Walker's 206th birthday, Windsor Mayor Drew Dilkens unveiled a bronze statue of Walker at Hiram Walker Parkette (Devonshire Road at Riverside Drive East).

== See also ==
- Gooderham and Worts Distillery
- Canadian Club
- Sherwood v. Walker
