= Walkerville, Ontario =

Former town in Ontario, Canada

Coordinates: 42.32°N 83.01°W

- Town
- Interactive map of Walkerville, Ontario
- Incorporated: 1890
- Annexation: July 1, 1935
- Founder: Hiram Walker

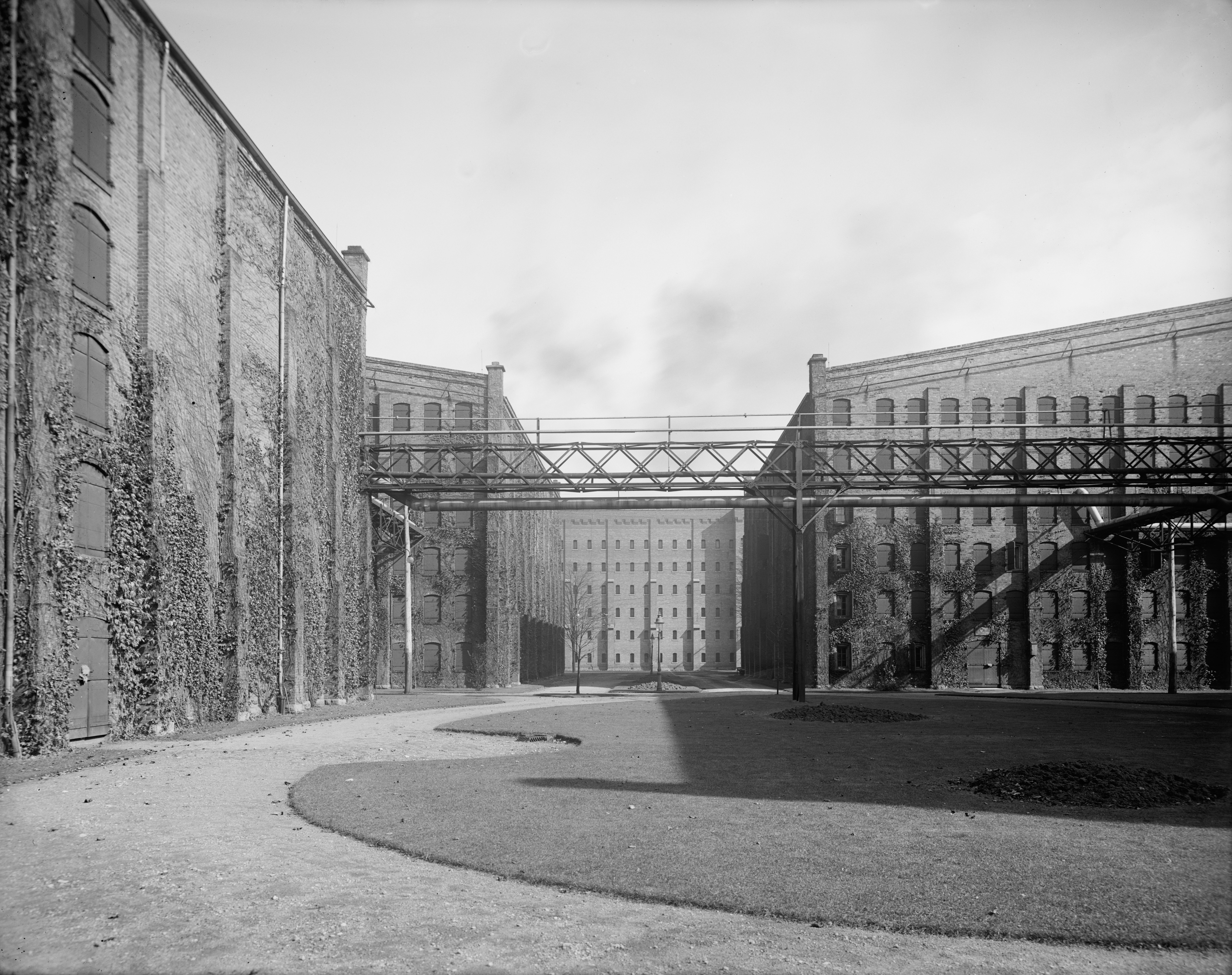
Distillery buildings in Walkerville circa 1910

Walkerville, Ontario is a former town in Canada that is today a heritage precinct and neighbourhood of Windsor, Ontario. It is not technically considered a Heritage Conservation District by Ontario law, but studies and discussion done in March of 2025 evaluated whether this status can be altered in the future.

Walkerville uses its own 'Walkerville Dollars' to boost the success of local business and increase appreciation for the history. This currency is only available as cash, and is equivalent in value to Canadian Dollars (CAD).

== History ==
Although was incorporated in 1890, Walkerville's history dates several decades beforehand. Hiram Walker, owner and producer of Canadian Club Whisky and founder of the town, began purchasing land in the area as early as 1856.

Walker planned it as a 'model town' (originally called 'Walker's Town'), that would be the envy of both the region and the continent. He established a distillery on the Detroit River and grew his business by growing grain, milling flour, and raising cattle and hogs. Though this success, Walkerville became a village in 1870 and eventually incorporated a decade later.

Transportation also improved in Walkerville due to Walker's planning, and a street railway as well as a railway hotel were constructed. Then, with the goal of increasing accessibility of transport of goods such as liquor and produce, Walker organized the creation of the Lake Erie, Essex, and Detroit River Railway. There was also ferry access to the town.

Later, the town supported other major industries, notably automotive manufacturing. It was annexed to Windsor on July 1, 1935.

== Architecture ==
Walker established homes for his workers, a church dedicated to his late wife, and a school. The town, which developed outward from the distillery, included buildings designed by Albert Kahn. This notably included the Willistead Manor, a 36-room mansion that was also the home of Walker's second son, Edward Chandler Walker. Upon Walkerville's eventual amalgamation with Windsor, the Manor became heritage-protected property of the city, being used as an art gallery and, currently, a function venue.

The neighbourhood is characterized by large houses, wide streets and abundant greenery. A three-story high school carrying the name 'Walkerville' stands next to Willistead Manor. Other structures include Devonshire Lodge, the home of former prime minister Paul Martin's family, Kahn-designed houses; the distillery (now belonging to Wiser's) and the Via Rail station. The Tivoli Theatre (recently reopened Old Walkerville Theatre) is of 1920s art-deco design by C. Howard Crane (who would also design the Fox Theater in Detroit, Michigan). A large performance stage, ornate fixtures, balconies, and grating-lattice hint at the community's grandeur in those days.

Additionally, Walkerville is home to the Dr. Charles W. Hoare House, which is listed on the register of Canada's Historic Places. It is noted for its Tudor Revival style. Despite being built in 1928 - only a few years before Walkerville became part of Windsor - the building has been mostly preserved. The Former Walkerville Post Office, a Beaux Arts style building, and Former Walkerville Town Hall of Renaissance Revival and Classical Revival styles, are also on the register.

In 2014, a project began to improve Walkerville's infrastructure and refurnish it to become more modern. The construction costed $3 million and was completed by J&J Lepera Infrastructures.

In 2024, the historic Strathcona Building was redone and unveiled to the public, being met with support.

The City of Windsor offers an online walking tour of Walkerville.

== Social and industrial growth ==
Historical population
Year	Pop.	±%
1901	1,595	—
1911	3,302	+107.0%
1921	7,059	+113.8%
1931	10,105	+43.2%

Divided into three sub-precincts, Walkerville was an amalgam of business, commercial, and residential land use, at times all nestled together. This cohesive character gave the community its uniqueness as compared to surrounding cities. Walker acted as self-appointed overseer of everything, including the police, fire and church facilities.

During the period of Prohibition in the United States, Walkerville became a principal source of cross-border alcohol exportation.

Hiram Walker favoured diversification, and Walkerville welcomed many industries, including the automotive industry. The Ford Motor Company of Canada opened its factory there in 1904, followed by the E-M-F Company whose plant was acquired by Studebaker in 1910 and which became the assembly line for right-hand-drive vehicles exported to the UK and British Empire. In 1929, the Financial Post reported that 500 of the town's families were supported by Studebaker,

"only one of its activities being the manufacture of motor cars. During the world war, great quantities of war material was produced for the Canadian and Imperial governments. Today, [the plant] manufactures a line of 59 models of six- and eight-cylinder passenger motor cars, trucks, ambulances, and funeral coaches".

Chrysler, General Motors and Seagrave were other manufacturers with plants in Walkerville. Somerville Limited also had a plant there which, when Walkerville became a part of Windsor, produced plastic conversion for the auto industry.

Currently, Walkerville is a popular alternative to downtown Windsor for many residents, with many citing the diversity of restaurants and businesses that are present as a reason for its success.

== See also ==
- Walkerville Collegiate Institute

== Gallery ==
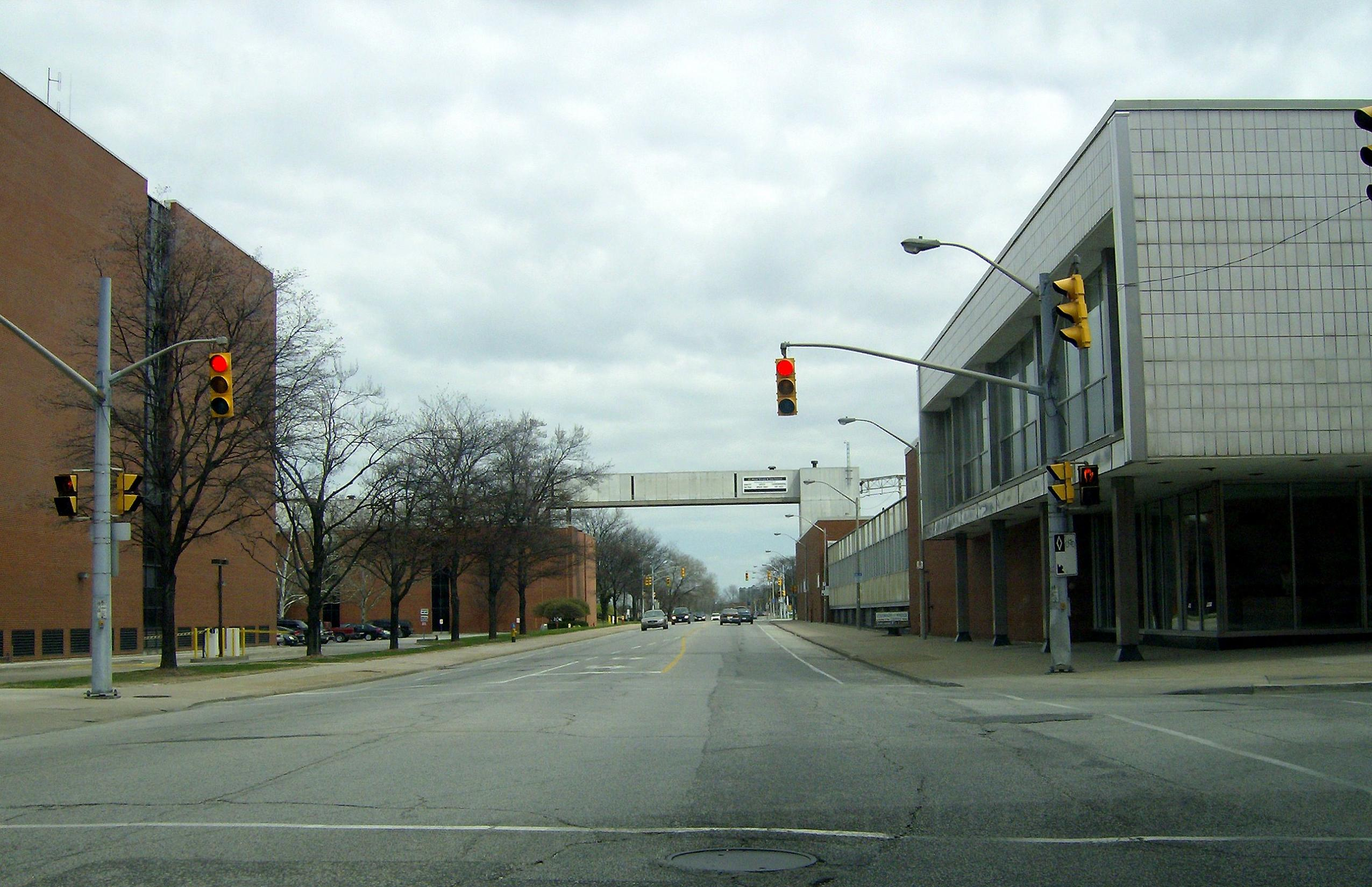
The corner of Riverside and Walker Road where the distillery still operates.

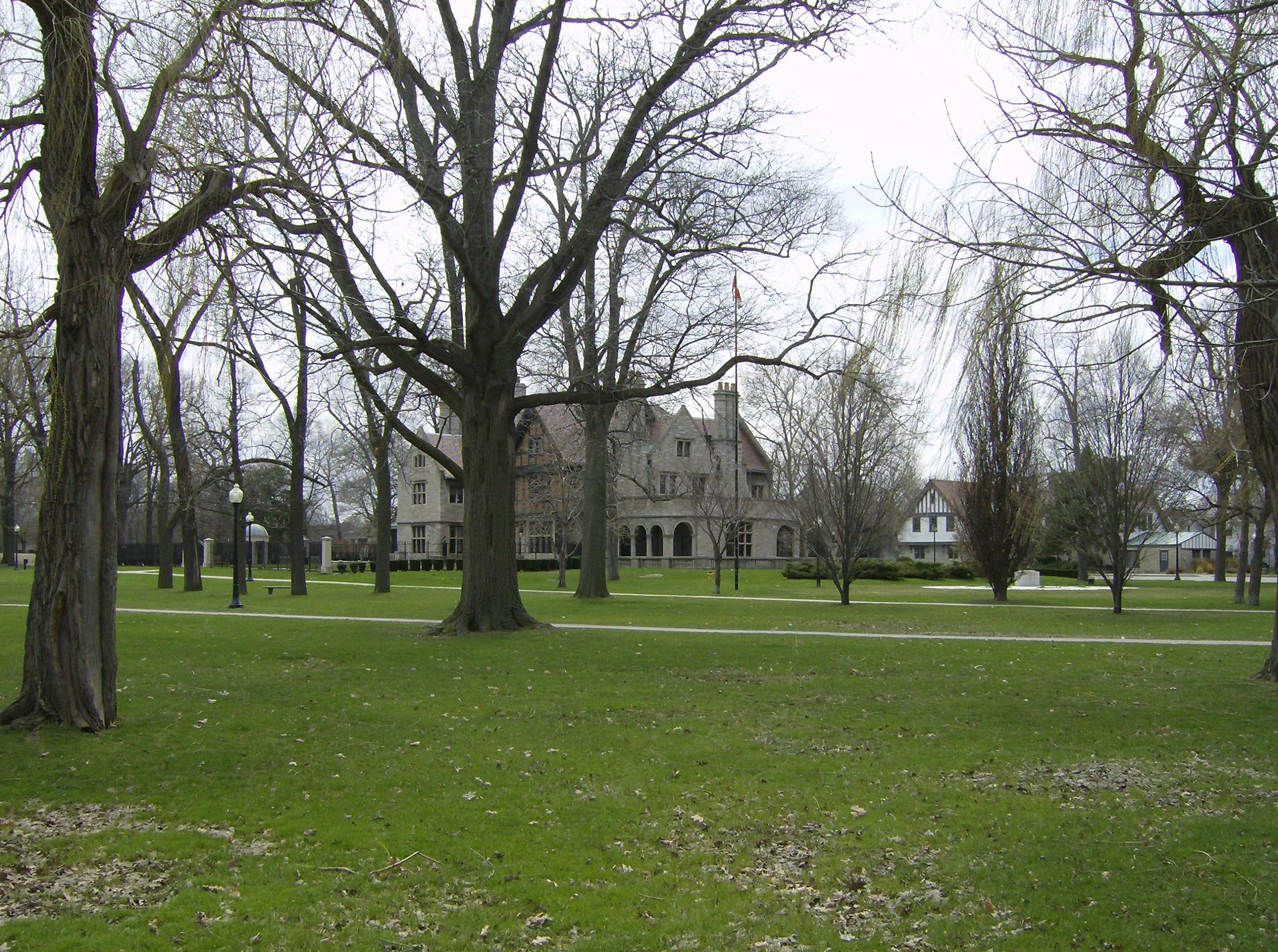
Willistead Manor, built by E. Chandler Walker and now a city park.

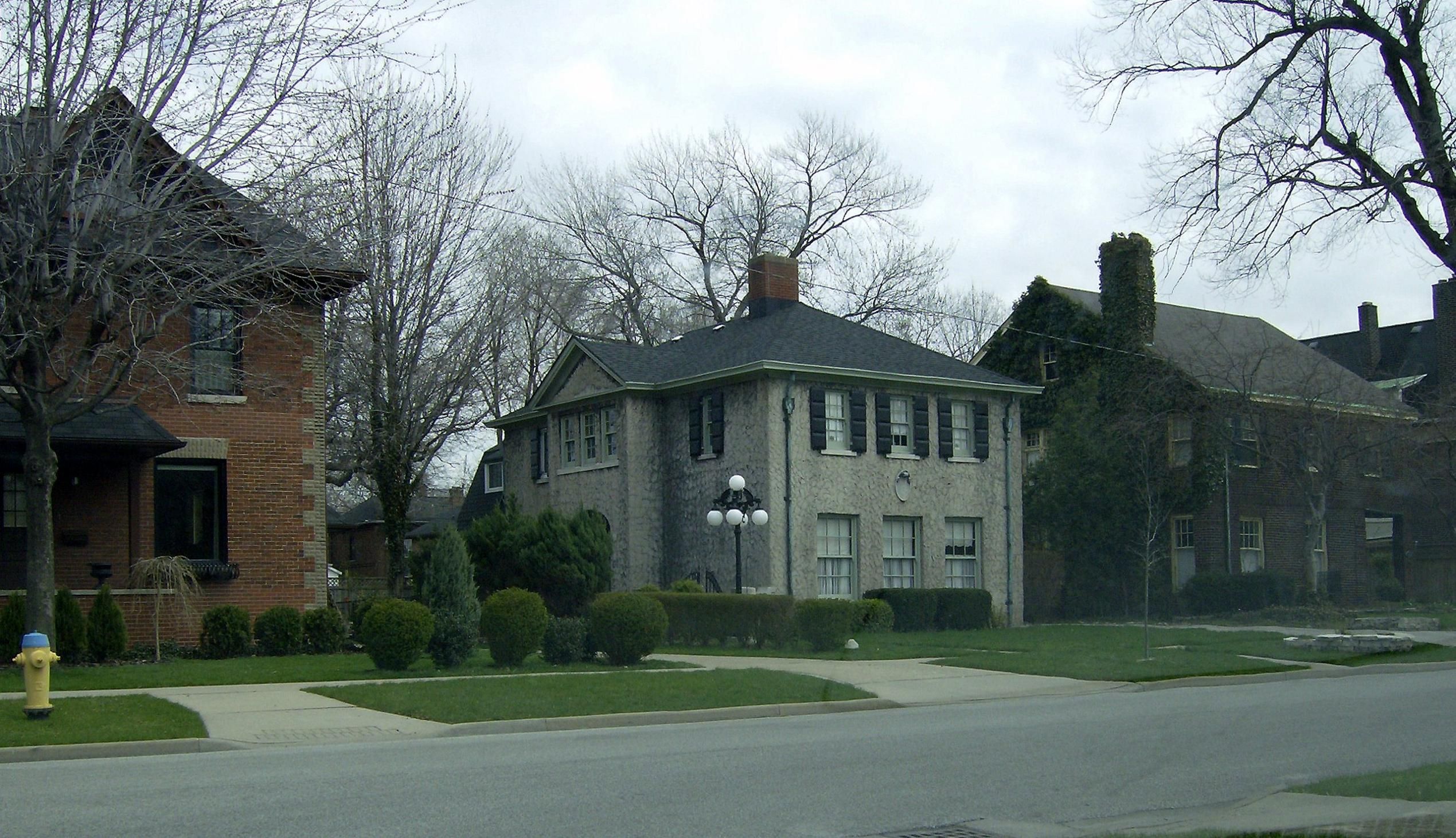
Homes in Walkerville.

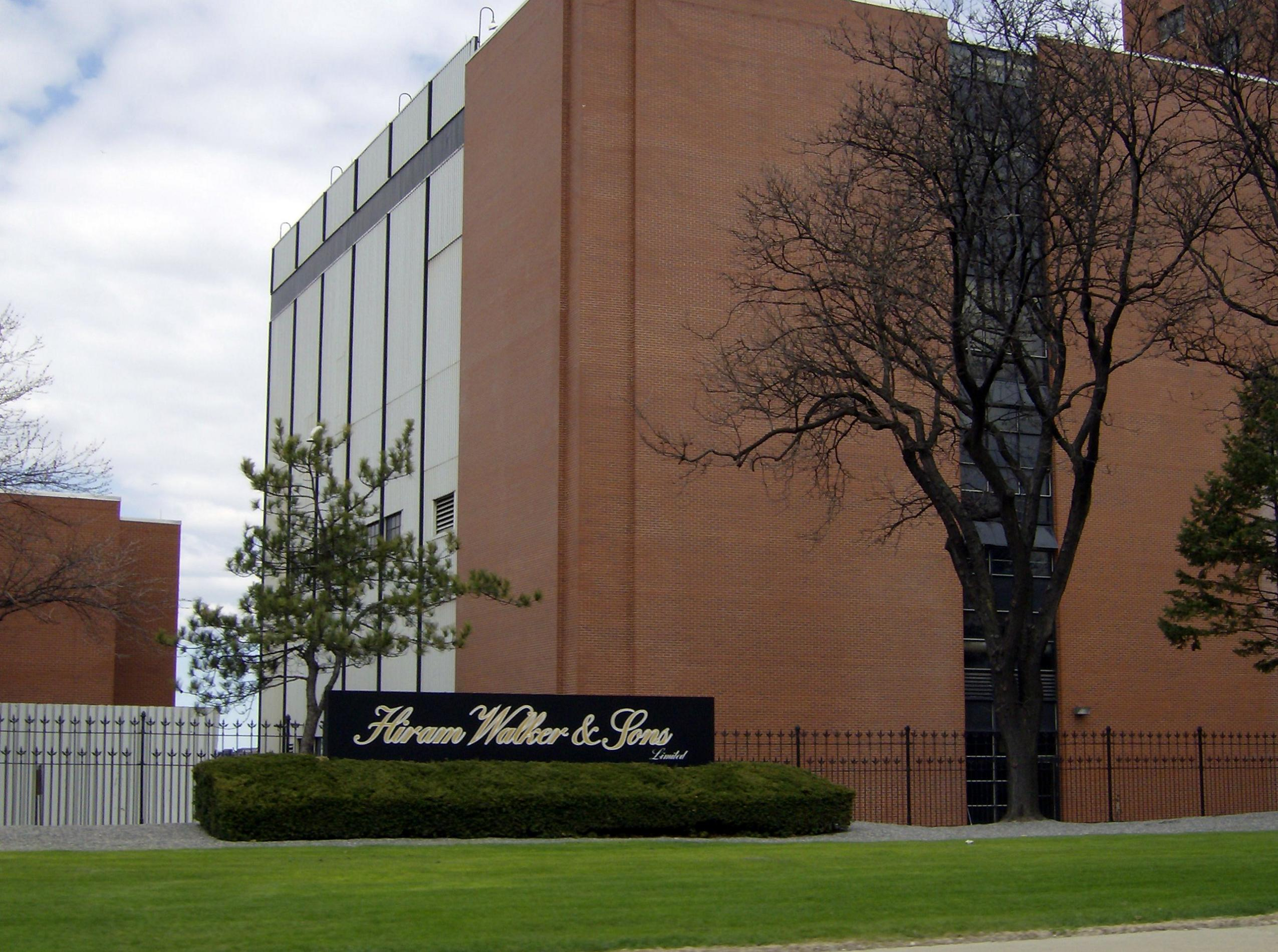
Hiram Walker distillery
