= Three Dots and a Dash =

Tiki bar in Chicago

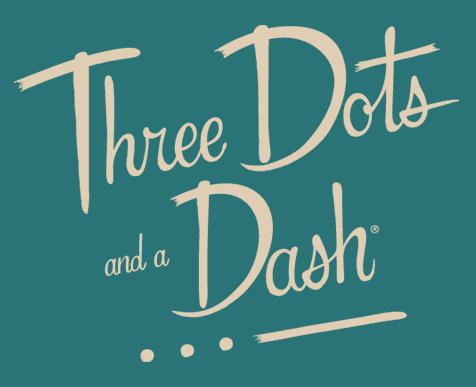

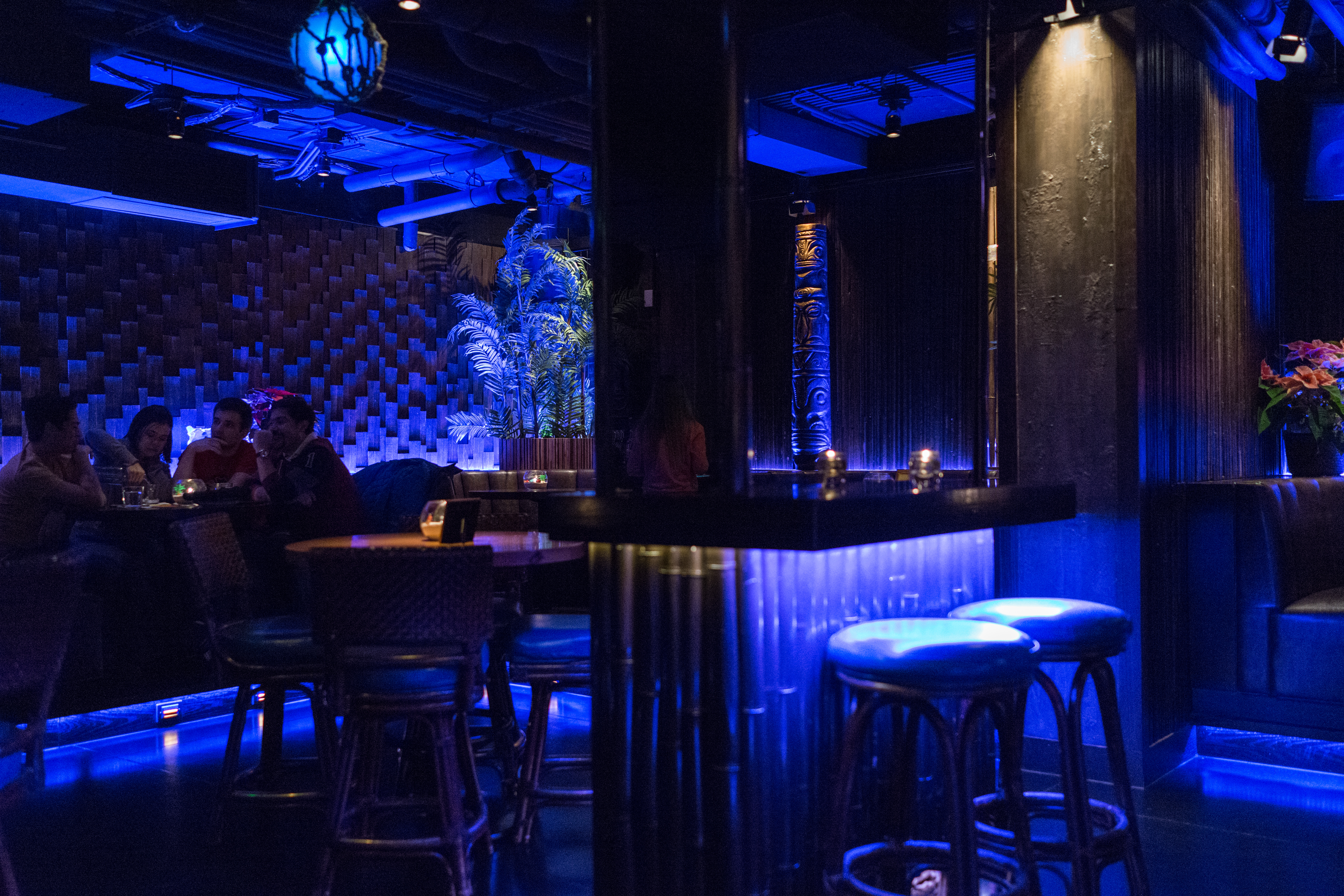
- Three Dots interior in 2014
- Interactive map of Three Dots and a Dash

Restaurant information
- Established: 2013
- Owner: Lettuce Entertain You Enterprises
- Location: 435 N Clark St, Chicago, Illinois
- Coordinates: 41.89028°N 87.63061°W
- Website: www.threedotschicago.com

Three Dots and a Dash is a craft cocktail tiki bar in the River North neighborhood of Chicago, Illinois.

Three Dots and a Dash was one of the first tiki bars with a consideration to mixology, along with Smuggler's Cove in San Francisco which opened in 2009. The bar was a success almost immediately; it sold 6,000 drinks per week in its first year.

== Attributes ==
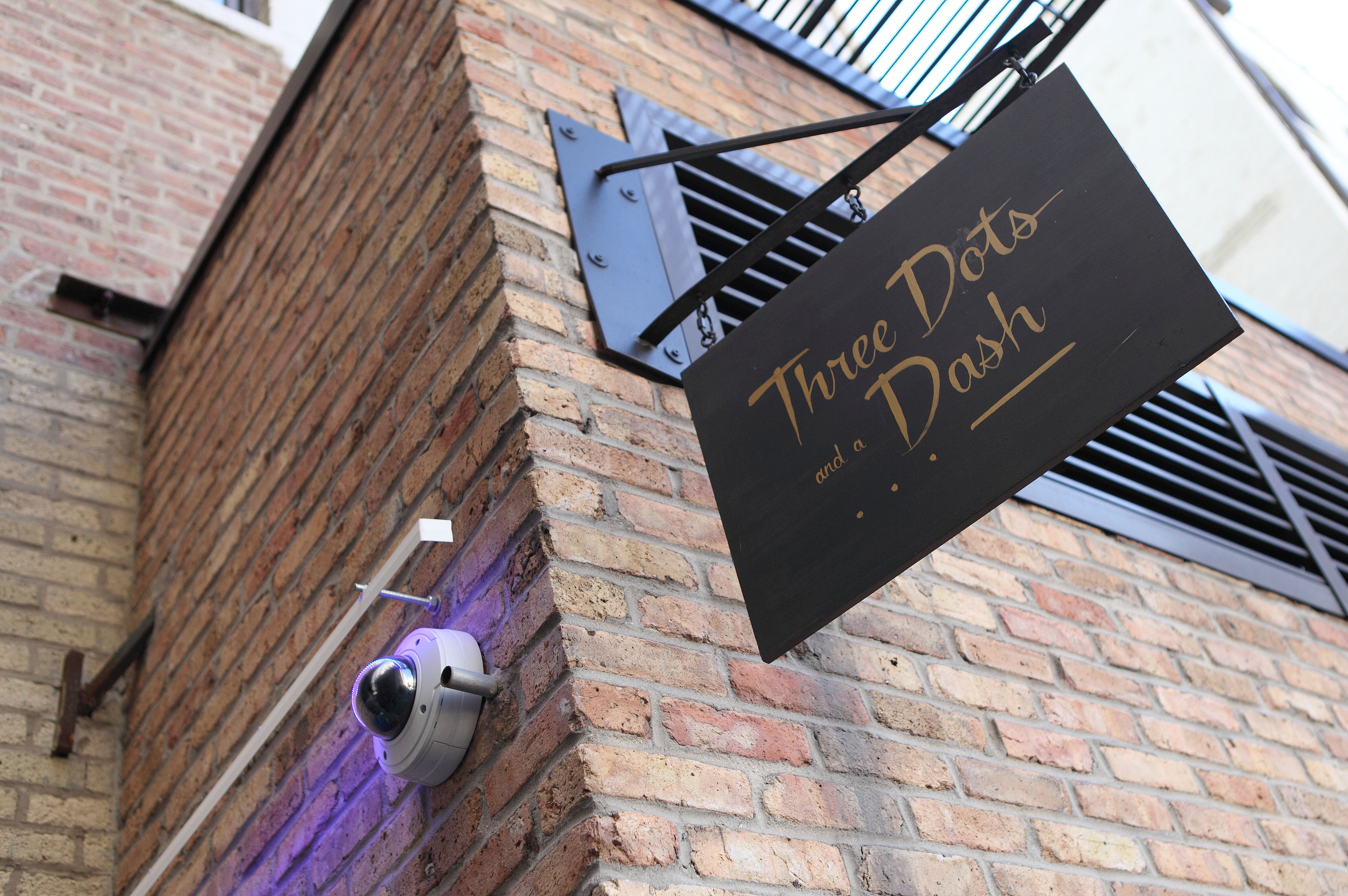
Sign hanging outside the bar entrance

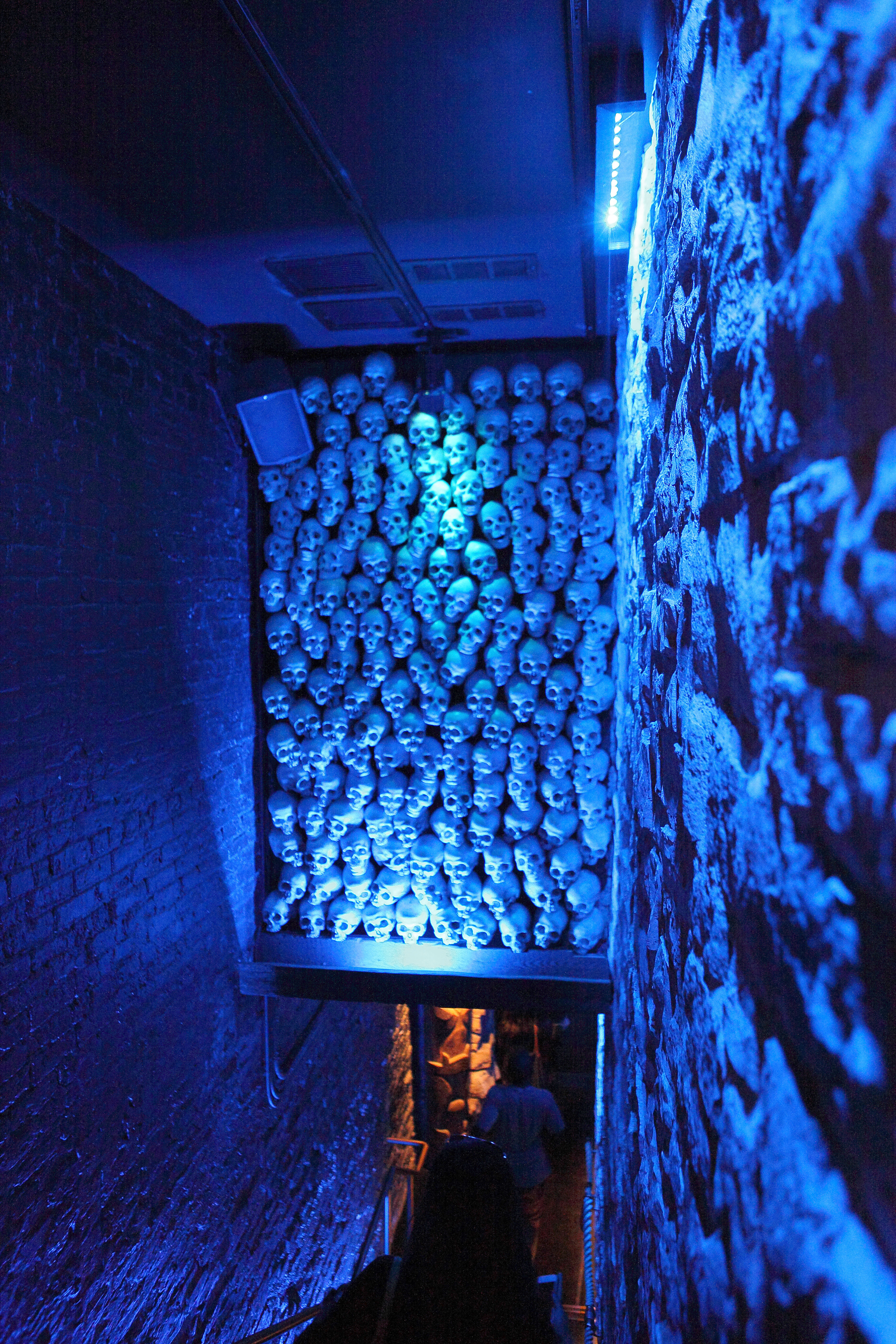
Stairwell down to the bar

The bar was named for the cocktail Three Dots and a Dash, a lost tiki drink discovered by Jeff Berry. The cocktail name is Morse code for "V", meaning "Victory", referencing World War II.

The bar has a discreet alleyway entrance, off of Hubbard Street in the River North district of Chicago. The entrance is sometimes given away by a red-roped line of people waiting to enter. Inside the building, a set of stairs leads to the bar space. The staircase is heavily decorated, with a blue wall of skulls paired with drum music. The bar itself is island-themed, and evokes elements of the 1940s. Its main room includes 15 booths, 7 tables, and a bar with 18 stools. Its capacity is 240 people. The bar also includes a service bar. The interior decor is tiki-style, including a fake thatched roof, colorful lighting, and ceramic tiki mugs. Owner Paul McGee has his likeness on swizzle sticks in the bar, as well as in a cartoon image on the back of the menu.

Three Dots attracts tiki aficionados, tourists at downtown hotels, and workers in the Loop district of Chicago. It is owned by Lettuce Entertain You Enterprises, which operates other foodservice businesses in the metropolitan area.

The bar also includes a smaller bar within the space. The 22-seat space, the Bamboo Room, formerly was used as a private event space, and is located to the right of the main bar. The Bamboo Room, opened in 2019, allows for a more interactive service style, where its two bartenders serve their drinks, and pour some tableside. The menu has sections for daiquiris, stirred drinks, and classics, and also includes several large-format drinks. Guests at the space receive an amuse-bouche-style drink, a pineapple daiquiri served over Japanese-style shaved ice. The room also includes a wide variety of rums, including vintage and expensive brands; rums from St. Lucia, Martinique, Cuba, Jamaica, and France. Some of these drinks are served in mugs from famous defunct tiki bars from around the country. The Bamboo Room is also planned to host guest bartenders, offer classes, and host special room events by distilleries.

=== Food and drinks ===
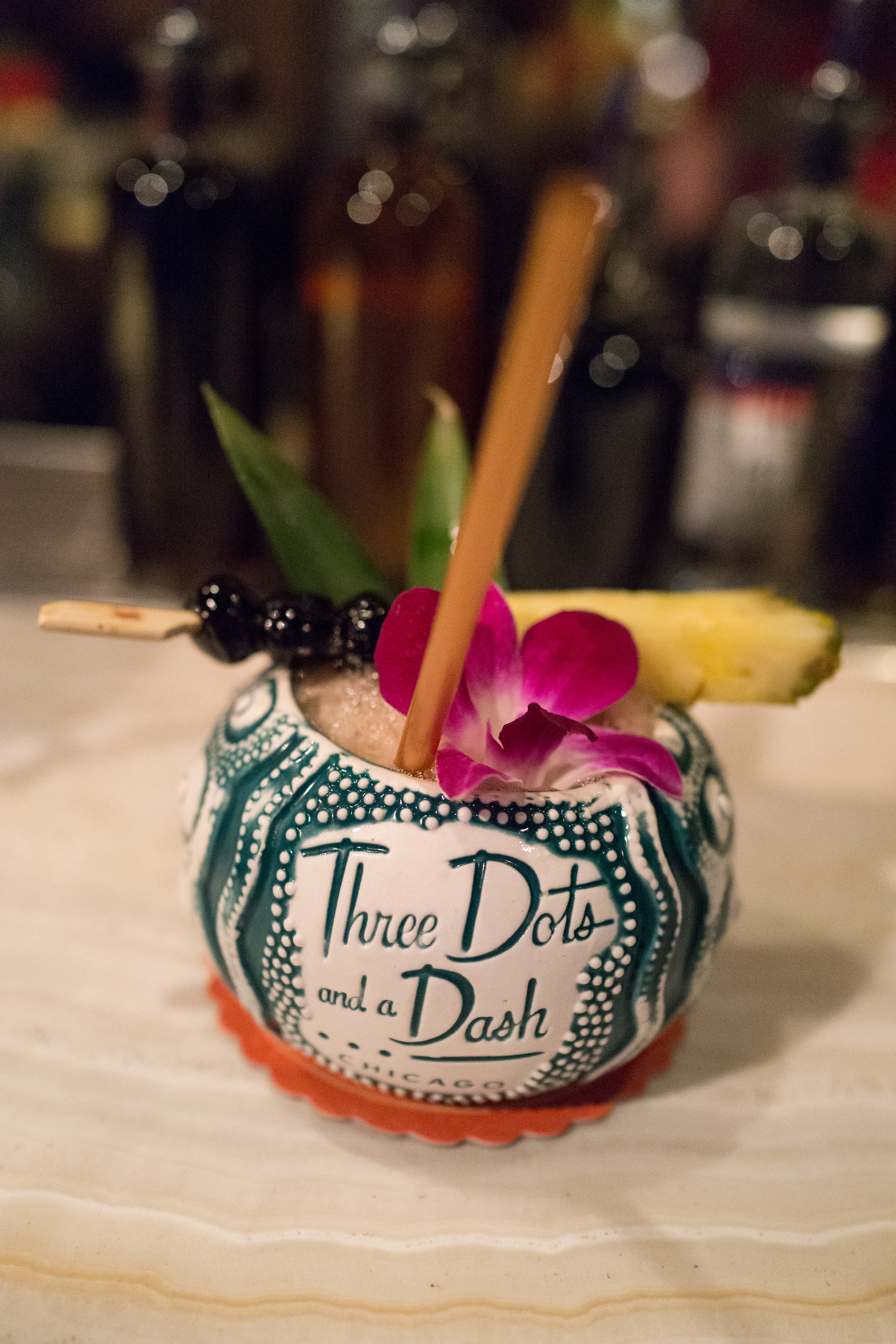
The Three Dots and a Dash cocktail at the bar

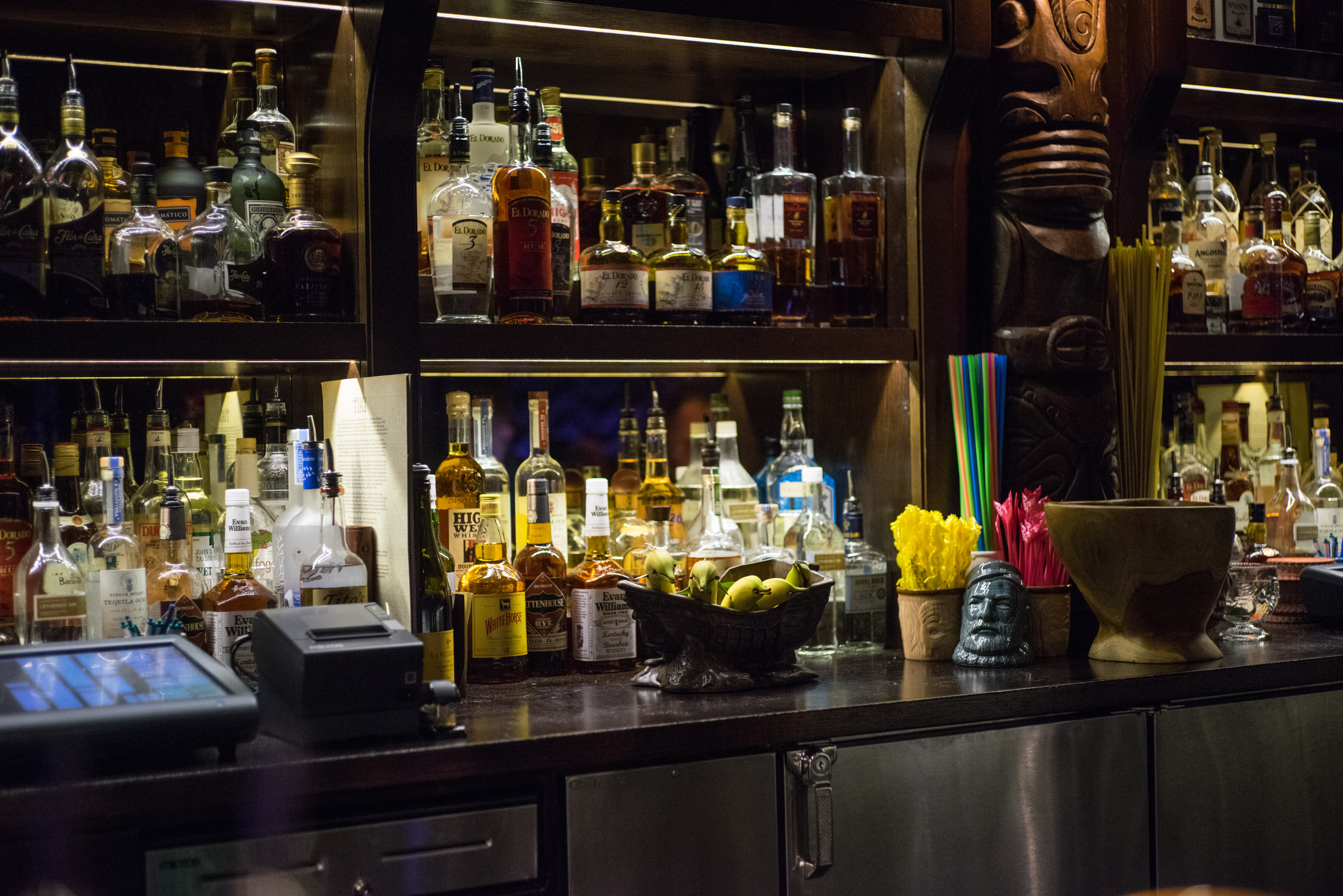
Part of the backbar

The menu has a variety of cocktails served in custom tiki mugs and glasses. Some of their custom mugs are sold in the bar. A section of the menu includes drinks meant to share, including a $385 cocktail, "Treasure Chest No. 1", which includes rums, juices, and Dom Pérignon Champagne, served in a treasure chest.

The bar serves its eponymous drink, with slight adjustments from its original recipe. The bar's owner adjusted the original orange juice with dry curacao and increased the amount of lime juice.

The food menu is made up of small bites, inspired by Polynesian foods.

== History ==
Three Dots and a Dash opened in 2013. One of its founding owners, Paul McGee, is a noted bartender known across the U.S. McGee left the bar after a year and a half.

In December 2014, McGee left as beverage director; Diane Corcoran took over the position. In April 2015, the bar introduced a new menu, where she replaced several drinks, made adjustments, and added a new sharable drink. Its chef Doug Psaltis also revised the menu, adding new items.

In 2016, the bar introduced a new cocktail menu by Julian Cox. The bartender, reportedly equally acclaimed to McGee, was brought in to adjust the menu, where he modernized tiki classics.

== Reception ==
The bar has won several awards and titles, including being named 13th best bar in the world, in The World's 50 Best Bars publication in 2014. Eater lists the bar among its 28 "essential bars in Chicago".

The bar does not address the controversy involved with tiki culture, and still is known as a "tiki bar". Eater wrote that in contrast, Lost Lake, another tiki bar in Chicago co-founded by Paul McGee, rebranded as a tropical bar after facing criticism. Lost Lake closed in 2022 from loss of business during the COVID-19 pandemic.
