= Philip Watts (designer) =

British product and interior designer

Philip Watts is a British designer based in Nottingham, whose work spans product design, architectural hardware, functional sculpture and commercial interiors. He is particularly associated with sculptural treatments of functional objects, including cast-metal door furniture, staircases and architectural fittings. He established Philip Watts Design after studying furniture and product design at Nottingham Trent University.

Watts has been the subject of profiles in The Wall Street Journal and Country Life. He has also worked on interiors for brands including Yo! Sushi and Greggs.

== Early career ==
Watts studied furniture and product design at Nottingham Trent University, graduating in 1992. He began his practice from a converted shed after graduation, before expanding into furniture, products, architectural fittings and interiors. He started a small design workshop in 1993.

By the late 1990s and early 2000s, his work was receiving regular coverage in Design Week for hospitality interiors, office projects and product design. In 2003, Watt's metal bathroom collection, including sinks and a bath, was launched at 100% Design.

== Product and architectural design ==
Watts is associated with architectural hardware that treats everyday fittings as sculptural objects. He is best known for highly sculptural door handles and discussed the relationship in his work between sculpture, jewellery and function. Bronze, brass and aluminium recur throughout his work, with designs drawing on organic forms such as branches and pebbles as well as playful reinterpretations of familiar objects.

During the first phase of the COVID-19 pandemic in 2020, Watts designed Shoe Pull, a stainless-steel fitting that allows a door to be opened with the foot. It is intended to reduce hand contact with doors in public spaces.

== Functional sculpture ==
One of Watts's largest projects is Chaos, a five-storey functional sculpture and pedestrian bridge network at the Custard Factory complex in Birmingham. It is the centrepiece of the redevelopment of the Zellig building and used approximately three miles of steel tubing with glass walkways.

== Interior design ==
Alongside product and architectural work, Watts developed a career in commercial interior design, particularly restaurants, retail and hospitality.

Philip Watts Design began working with Yo! Sushi in the mid-2000s.

Watts also worked on concepts for the first Greggs Moment coffee-shop concept in Newcastle, using bespoke and upcycled pieces in an interior based around "Britishness" and "inclusivity". He later designed several Yo! Sushi outlets and the Kingly Club.

The practice also designed George's Fish & Chip Kitchen in Nottingham. The project won the Restaurant & Bar Design Award for Restaurant or Bar in a Heritage Building in 2015.

== Exhibitions and recognition ==
In 2009, Nottingham Trent University's Bonington Gallery hosted 15 Years of Philip Watts Design - A Retrospective, bringing together product, interior and sculptural work. The exhibition included a cast-aluminium spiral staircase alongside lighting, architectural hardware, bathroom products and earlier retail pieces. Philip Watts Design was named FX Interior Design Practice of the Year in 2007.

== Design approach ==
A recurring theme in Watts's work is the transformation of ordinary functional elements into objects with a strong sculptural identity.
