= Rumba (restaurant) =

Bar and restaurant in Seattle, Washington, U.S.

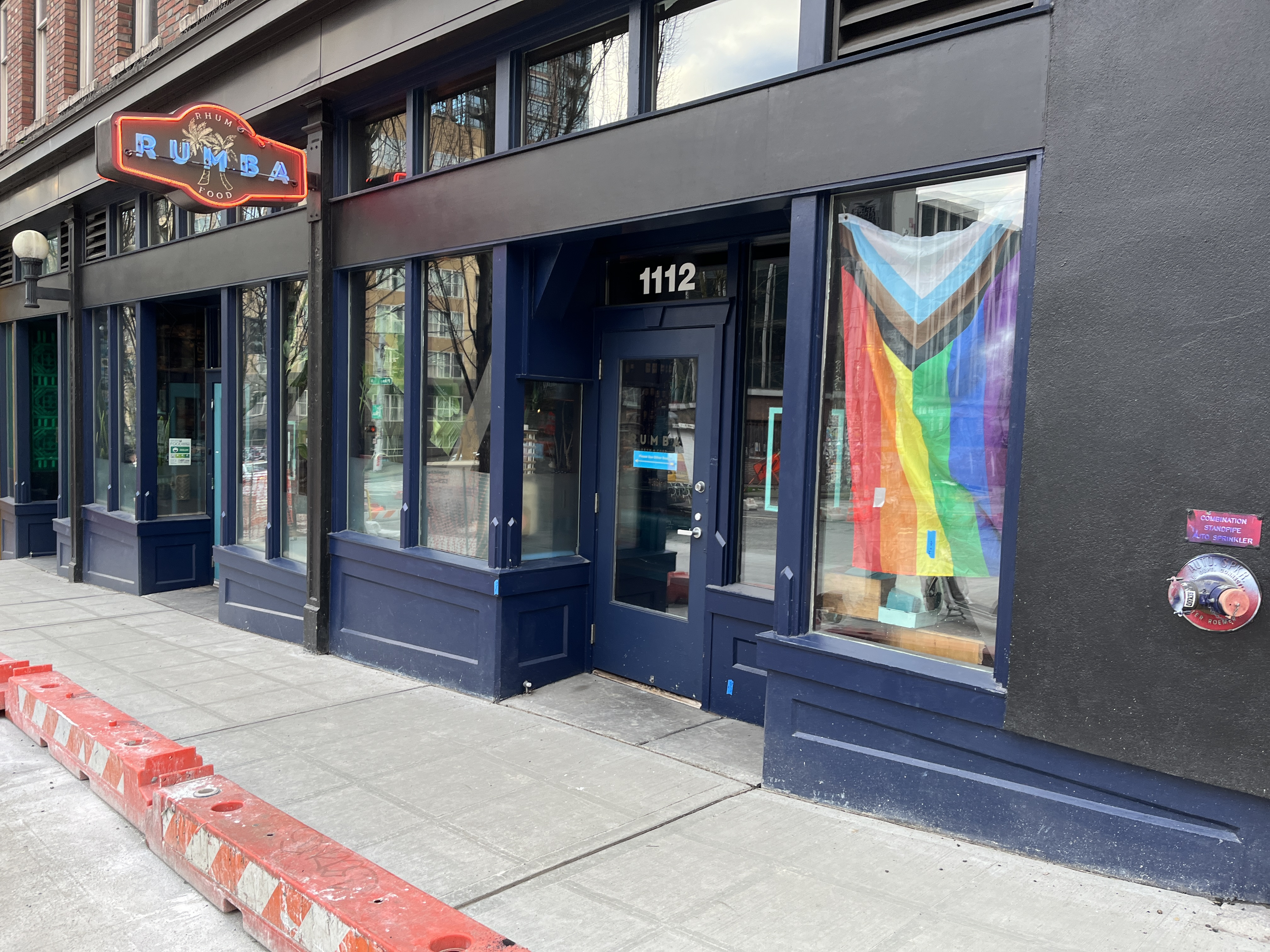
- Rumba's exterior in 2024
- Interactive map of Rumba

Restaurant information
- Established: September 14, 2012
- Owner: Travis Rosenthal
- Location: 1112 Pike Street, Seattle, Washington, 98101, United States
- Coordinates: 47°36′50″N 122°19′43″W

Rumba is a bar and restaurant in Seattle, in the U.S. state of Washington. Opened by owner Travis Rosenthal in 2012, Rumba was named one of the best new bars by Details magazine and has been recognized by Tales of the Cocktail.

== Description ==
Rumba opened as Seattle's first rum bar. Eater Seattle has said, "With its hardback Hemingway collection and aquamarine, Caribbean blue accents, Rumba radiates an upscale, tropical vibe". The menu has included Central/South American and Caribbean cuisine such as ceviche, empanadas with mushroom or spiced chorizo, jerk chicken wings, pork belly tostones, and tacos, as well as sandwiches, daiquiris, and non-alcoholic drinks. Seattle Metropolitan has said the bar serves Cuban cuisine and "exudes a languorous Havana vibe". Rumba has small plates and a drink list with approximately 700 sugar cane spirits. The interior has bookcases with "island" tchotchkes. Rumba has been described as a "sibling" of the Spanish tapas restaurant Tango's.

== History ==
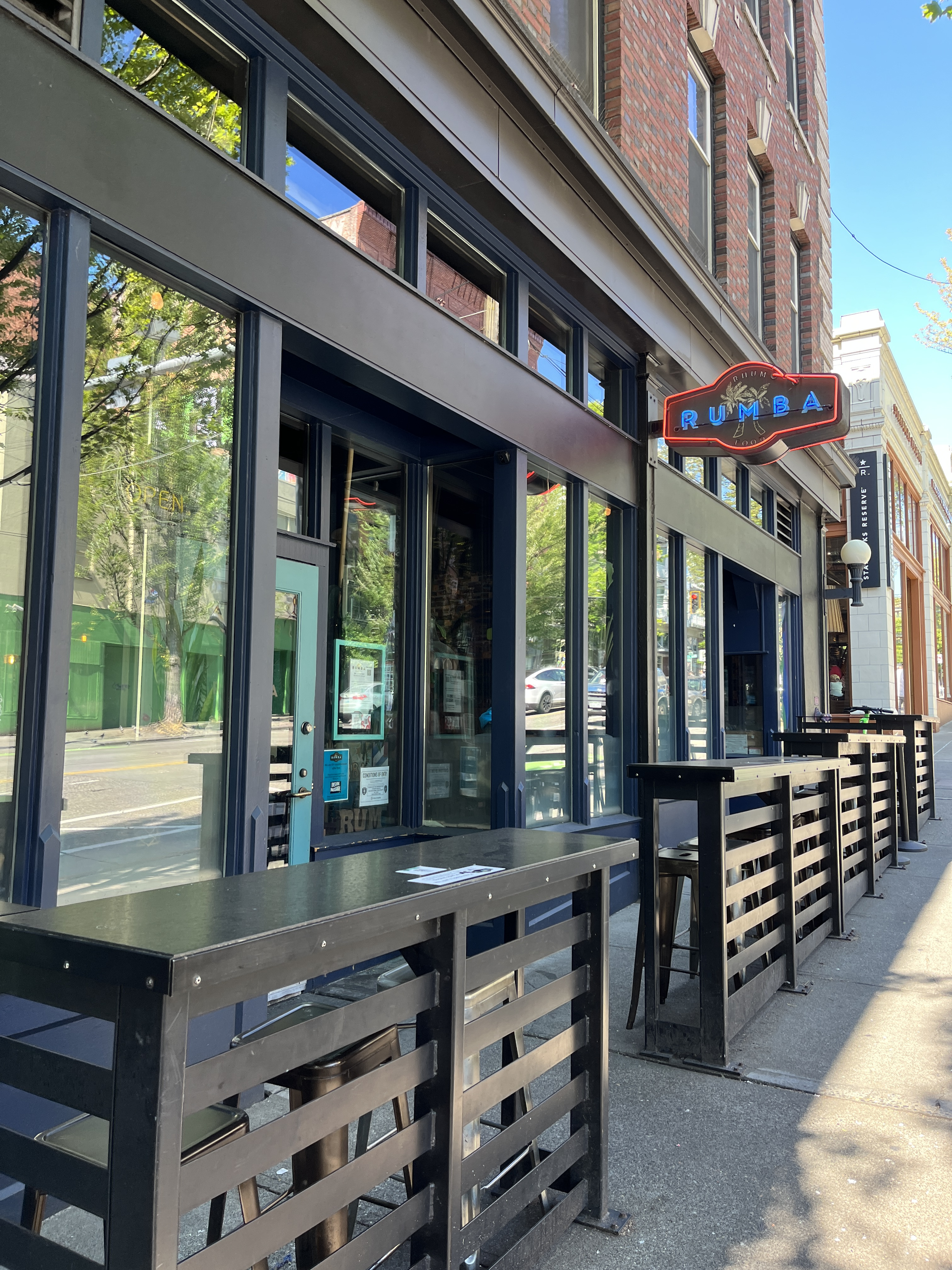
The bar's exterior, 2023

Media outlets first reported on a new rum bar from owner Travis Rosenthal in May 2012. A "late summer" opening became September 14. The bar debuted a sidewalk patio in 2013. In 2014, the bar manager launched a loyalty program in the form of a Rum Map to sample various rum varieties. For Halloween, Rumba hosted a pineapple carving contest and served Funk Juice (rum with pineapple).

The bar began serving lunch in 2015. Jet Lutge became Rumba's first dedicated chef in late 2018. As of 2019, on Tiki Wednesdays the bar served "over-the-top" tiki drinks.

=== Inside Passage ===
Rosenthal secured the lease to additional space and opened Inside Passage, which has been described as a speakeasy and a "bar-within-a-bar that serves amazingly unique drinks and nautical vibes". Inside Passage is accessed by a "secret passage" and has a giant sea monster called Kiki hanging from the ceiling. It serves "wildly creative" drinks, with each having a "different story and different elements".

== Reception ==
Rumba has included in Details magazine's list of the best new bars in the U.S. Leonardo David Raymundo included the business in Eater Seattle's 2017 list of ten "first-class" Caribbean restaurants in the city. Writers for the website also included Rumba in a 2023 list of twenty "essential" Capitol Hill restaurants. Tales of the Cocktail's regional top ten lists for the West Coast included Rumba in 2018. The bar was also nominated for World's Best Spirits Selection by Tales of the Cocktail in 2020.
