= Jigger & Pony =

Bar in Singapore

Coordinates: 1°16′30″N 103°50′37″E

- Interactive map of Jigger & Pony

Restaurant information
- Established: 2012
- Owners: Indra Kantono; Gan Guoyi
- Location: 165 Tanjong Pagar Rd, Singapore
- Website: jiggerandpony.com

Jigger & Pony is a bar located in Amara Hotel, Singapore.

== Description ==
The bar Jigger & Pony operates in Singapore's Amara Hotel. Fodor's describes the space as "cozy", "inviting", and dimly lit. The Infatuation has described the interior is "sultry, sleek, and upholstered with more velvet than Prince's wardrobe". The drink menu has traditional cocktails such as martinis, negronis, and old fashioneds, as well as "signature" options such as a gin fizz with orange flower bubbles and a whiskey sour with yuzu marmalade.

== History ==
Indra Kantono and Gan Guoyi opened the bar in 2012 at Amoy Street, Singapore. It later moved to Amara Hotel at Tanjong Pagar in 2018. The bar closed temporarily in March 2020, reopening in September.

Saverio Casella is the principal bartender.

== Reception ==
The Spirits Business has said Jigger & Pony is among Southeast Asia's "most high-profile" bars. Jigger & Pony was ranked Asia's best bar in the Asia's Best Bars list in 2020. It has since ranked second in the same list from 2021 to 2023. Jigger & Pony was named the Best International Hotel bar at Tales of the Cocktail in 2023. Anthony Eu of The Infatuation wrote, "If you somehow can't find something you like on the menu, have one of their bartenders whip you up something, find a spot for prime people-watching, and revel in the fact that you got to drink at the best bar in Asia." Time Out Singapore included the business in a 2024 list of the country's 50 best bars. The Michelin Guide has described the bar as "one of the frontrunners in Singapore's drinks industry".

== See also ==
- List of restaurants in Singapore
- The World's 50 Best Bars
