= The Dead Rabbit =

Cocktail bar in New York City

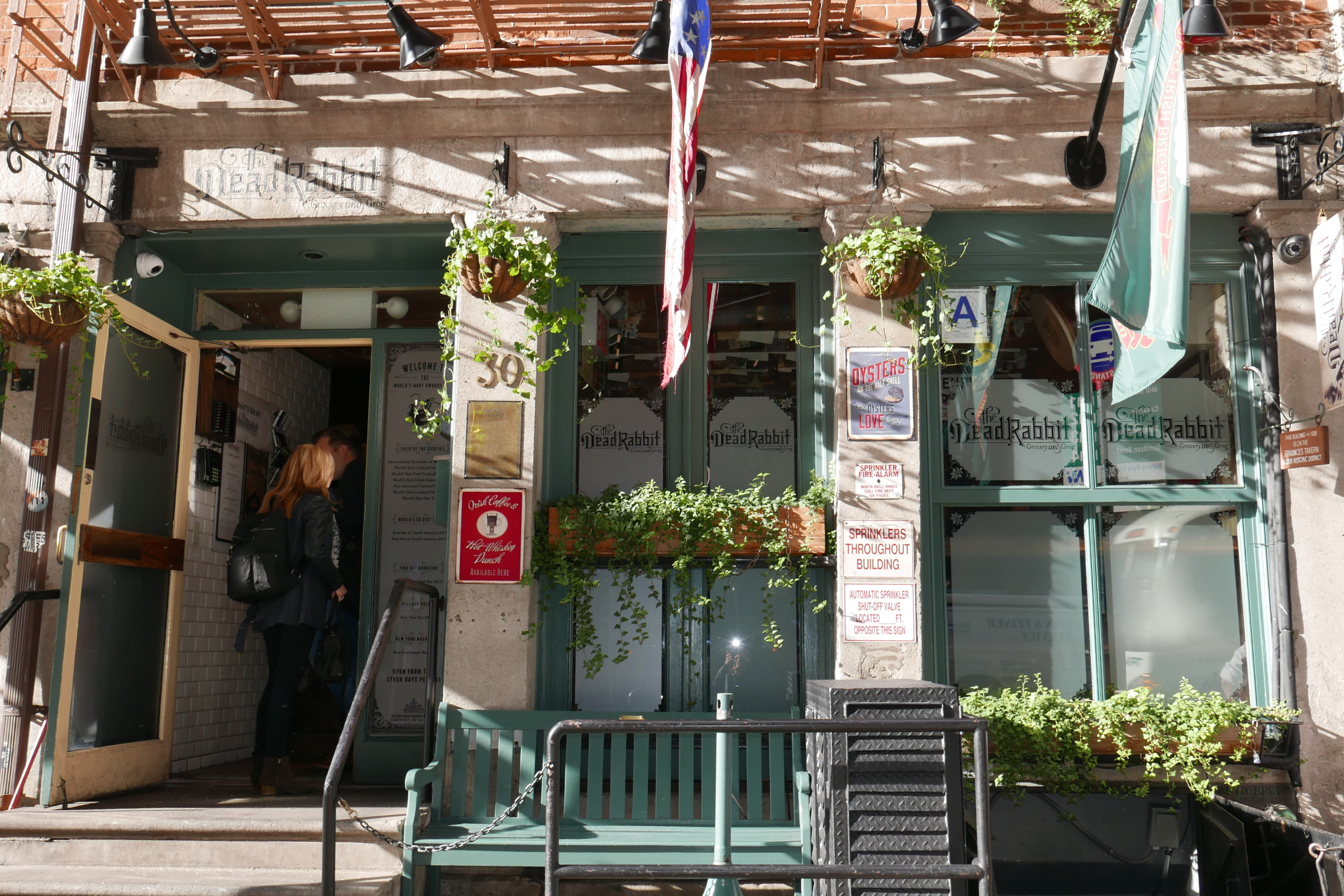
- Bar exterior in 2015
- Interactive map of The Dead Rabbit

Restaurant information
- Established: 2013
- Owner: Jack McGarry
- Previous owner: Sean Muldoon (cofounder)
- Food type: Irish pub and cocktail bar
- Dress code: Casual
- Location: 30 Water St., Manhattan, New York City
- Coordinates: 40.703261°N 74.011018°W
- Other locations: The Dead Rabbit- Austin, TX The Irish Exit- Moynihan Train Hall, NYC San Patricios- Jersey City, New Jersey
- Website: thedeadrabbit.com

The Dead Rabbit, also known as The Dead Rabbit Grocery and Grog, is a craft cocktail bar in the Financial District of Manhattan, New York City. The bar was founded in 2013 in its location on Water Street. It opened as a "cocktail emporium", evoking the drinking habits of 19th-century New Yorkers. The bar's name is a reference to the Dead Rabbits, an Irish American street gang active in Lower Manhattan from the 1830s to 1850s.

The establishment was rated the best bar in the world in 2016, as compiled by The World's 50 Best Bars. It was also named world's best bar at the Tales of the Cocktail competition. They're primarily known for their Irish coffee, available in standard, frozen, martini. and "Alexander" form, a hybrid cocktail of said Irish coffee and a Brandy Alexander.

In 2022, the bar announced plans to open locations in New Orleans and Austin, Texas, as well as a sister bar in Charleston. One of the bar's owners will work with its beverage director to establish the Charleston bar, while still remaining a silent partner at The Dead Rabbit. A new beverage director would be named for The Dead Rabbit bar. Another location opened in Austin in July, 2024.

The bar is in the Fraunces Tavern Block Historic District, a National Historic Landmark District and a New York City designated landmark district.

The establishment has three stories, including a ground-floor taproom with basic drinks, a second-floor parlor with craft cocktails, and a third-floor, private room for parties.

Irish Coffee, the signature cocktail at Dead Rabbit
