= Smuggler's Cove (bar) =

Tiki bar in San Francisco, California

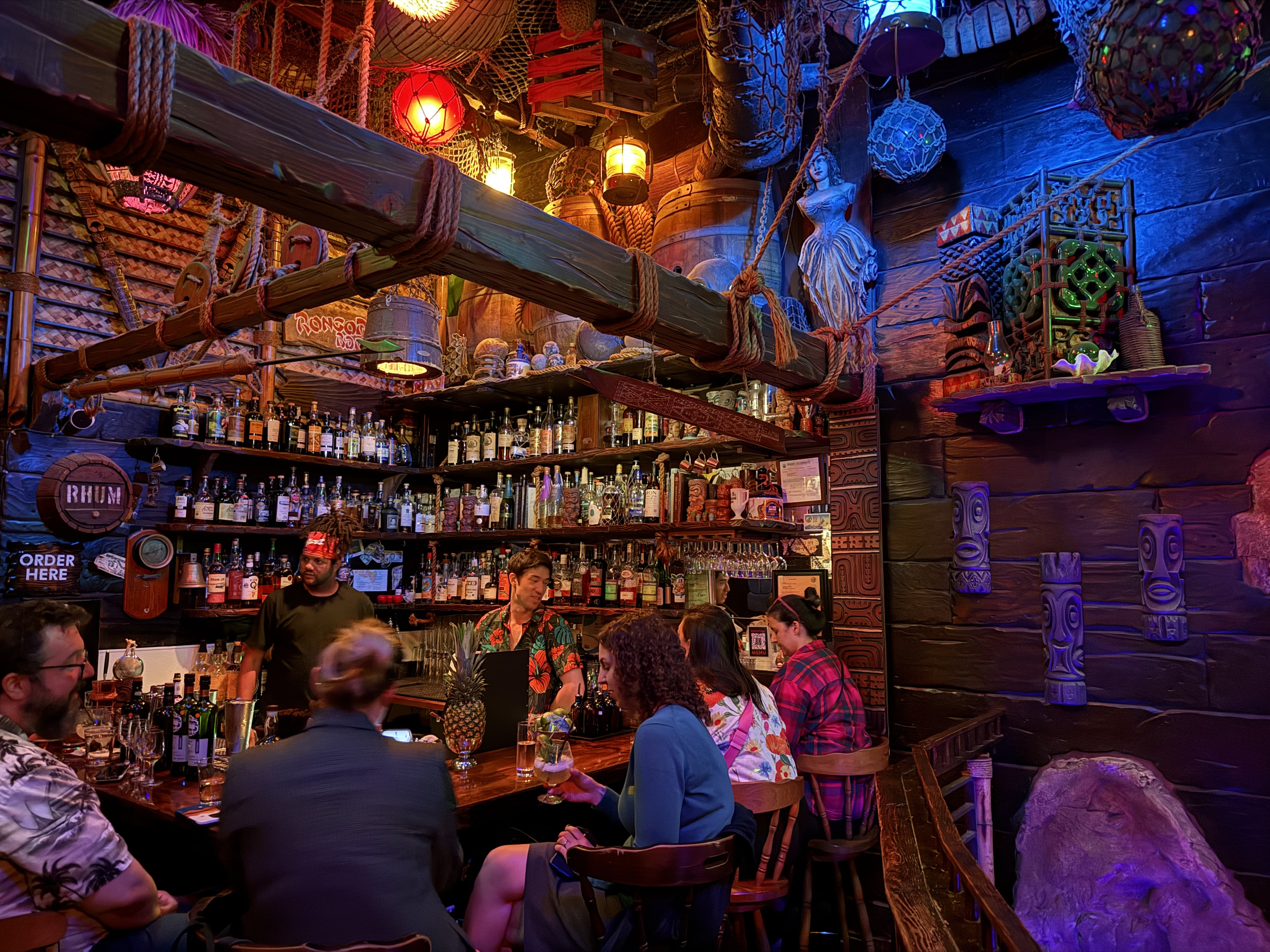
- The bar's interior in 2025
- Interactive map of Smuggler's Cove

Restaurant information
- Established: December 8, 2009; 16 years ago
- Owners: Martin Cate; Rebecca Cate
- Location: 650 Gough Street, San Francisco, California, 94102, US
- Coordinates: 37°46′46″N 122°25′24″W
- Website: smugglerscovesf.com

Smuggler's Cove is a tiki bar in the Hayes Valley neighborhood of San Francisco, California, United States. It was founded in 2009 by Martin Cate, who now co-owns the bar with his wife Rebecca. The three-story bar offers the largest selection of rums of any bar in the US, with over 1,300 varieties as of 2025. The bar's menu features 80 cocktails, including classics of the tiki canon and some original recipes.

Widely considered one of the world's greatest tiki bars, Smuggler's Cove was named the best cocktail bar in the United States by Tales of the Cocktail in 2016, and it appeared on The World's 50 Best Bars six years in a row, between 2011 and 2016.

== History ==
Smuggler's Cove founder Martin Cate first encountered tiki culture at a Trader Vic's bar in Washington, D.C. Inspired by the bar's decor, in 1998, he and his wife Rebecca built a tiki bar in their apartment's spare bedroom. In 2004, Cate abandoned his job in transportation logistics and successfully applied for a job at a Trader Vic's in San Francisco despite having no formal bartending experience. He later became a co-owner of Alameda tiki bar Forbidden Island, before leaving the bar in February 2009.

On June 4, 2009, Cate announced plans to open Smuggler's Cove at an undisclosed location in San Francisco, alongside a browser game that progressively unveiled clues about the bar's location on a treasure map. The announcement was met with widespread excitement from the cocktail community throughout the United States, with The New York Times calling Cate "an acknowledged master of both the rum cocktail and of tiki culture" and Eater SF naming him a "local bar legend" before the bar opened.

Smuggler's Cove opened to the public on December 8, 2009, following a limited media preview night four days beforehand. The bar took the place of Jade Bar, which previously occupied all three floors of the space. As of 2016, Smuggler's Cove has been co-owned by Martin and Rebecca Cate.

== Decor ==
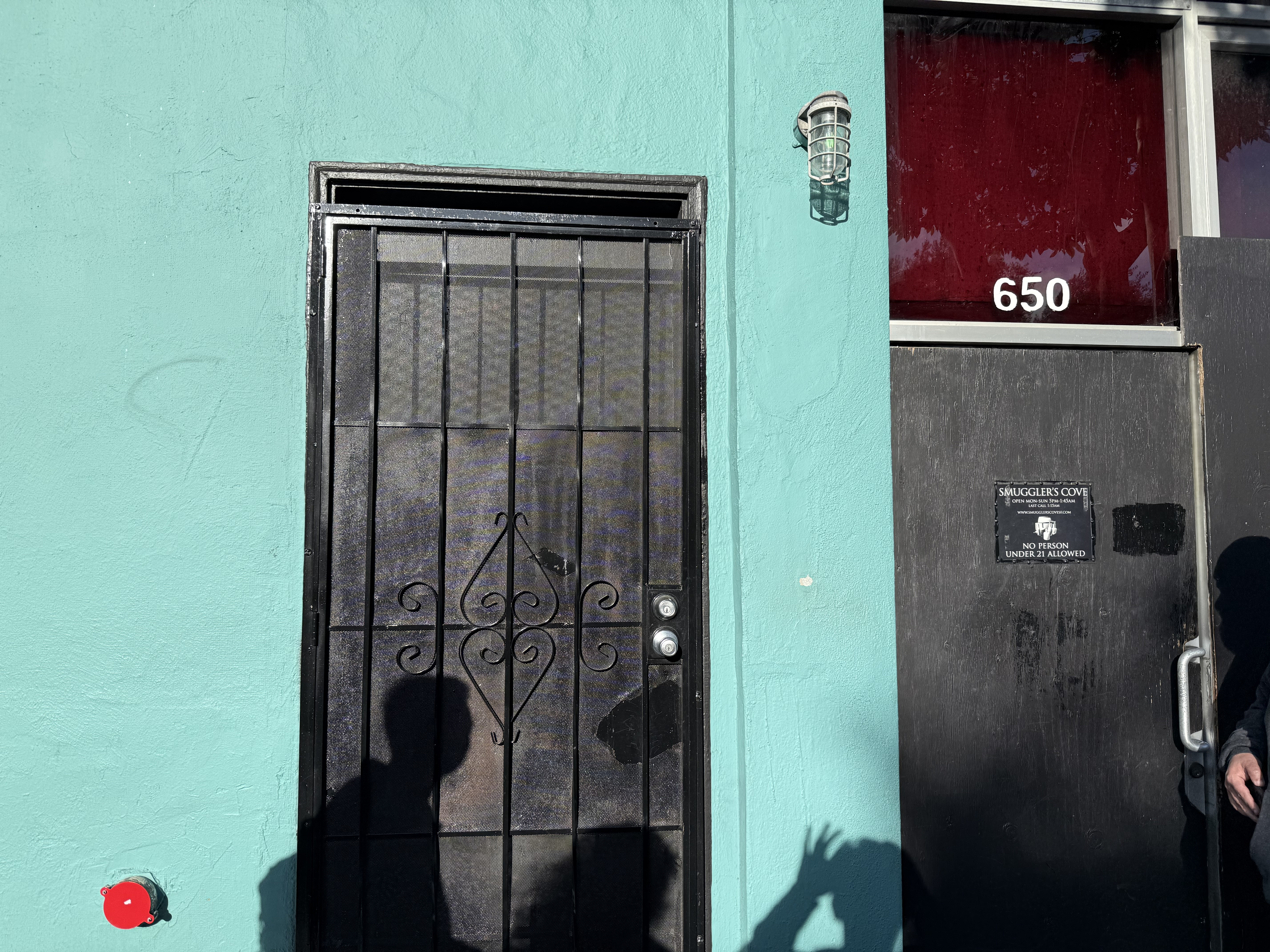
Exterior of Smuggler's Cove in 2025

The exterior of Smuggler's Cove is unassuming, with the entrance only marked by a red light bulb and a small placard on the door. The interior of the bar has three floors, with bars on the main and lower floors. The bar's interior decor, initially crafted by local designer Ignacio Gonzalez in collaboration with Martin Cate, was inspired by the nautical aesthetics of Polynesia, featuring dark wood, ropes, an indoor waterfall, a full-sized anchor, and various other flotsam and jetsam and pirate-themed memorabilia. Cate prioritizes the authenticity of the bar's decor, describing his decorations in a 2025 interview as real and handmade. He further described: "these are crafts. This is texture, natural, real artistry. This is hand-carved."

Smuggler's Cove's soundtrack draws from a diverse range of musical influences inspired by the global history of tiki culture, including Hawaiian ukulele music, traditional music from Cuba and Brazil, bossa nova and samba from the 1960s, surf music, funk, soul, and exotica.

== Rum collection ==
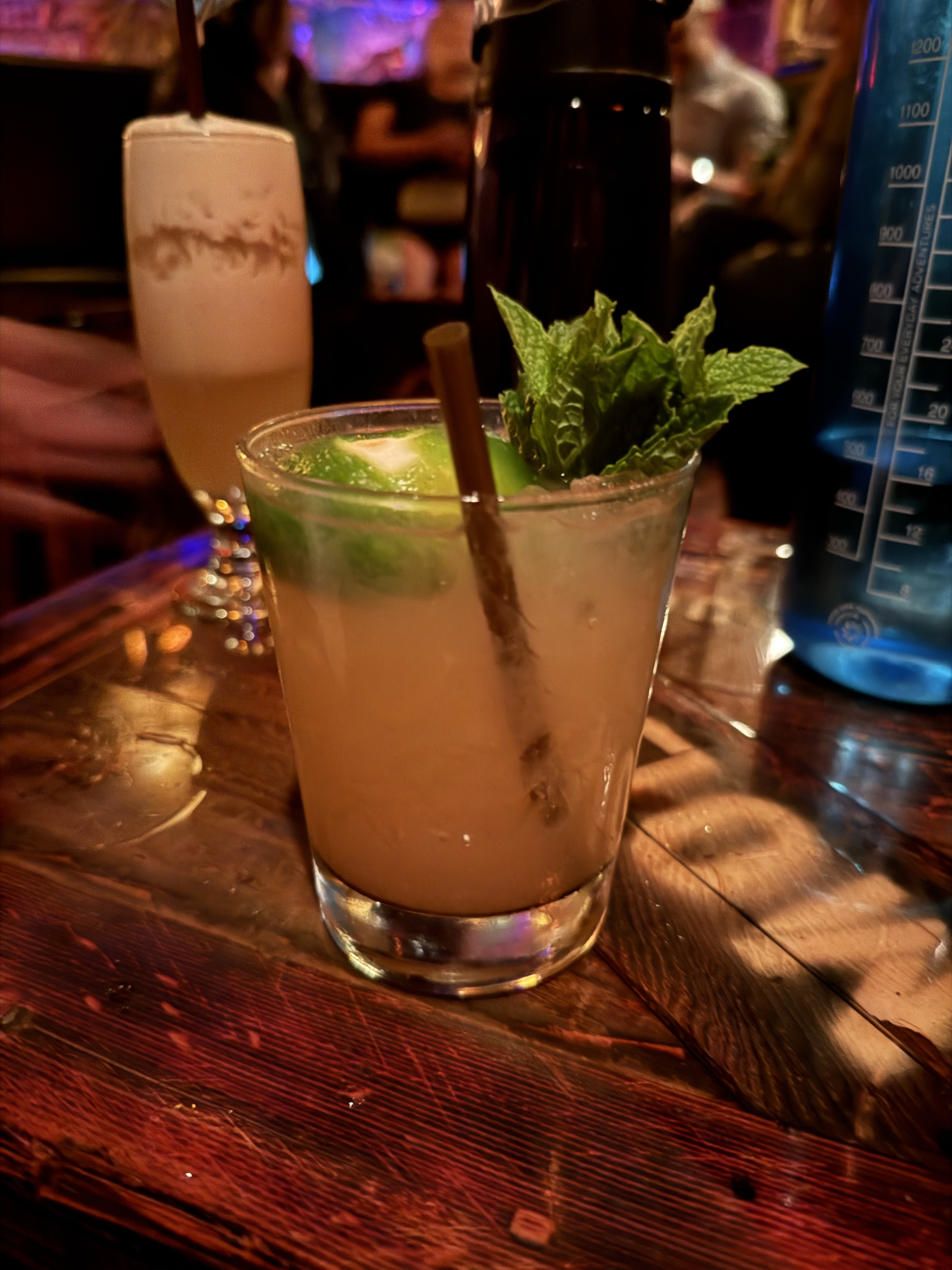
The Mai Tai, a classic rum-based tiki cocktail, at Smuggler's Cove

Multiple outlets have reported that Smuggler's Cove offers the largest selection of rums of any bar in the United States, with over 1,300 different varieties in stock as of 2025 according to general manager Christopher Ward. The rums are organized by country of origin, split between the first-floor bar, downstairs bar, and storage rooms within the building. The collection includes several rare and historical rums that cannot be found anywhere besides Smuggler's Cove, as well as some one-off rums that Smuggler's Cove has created in collaboration with Plantation and El Dorado. Only a small percentage of the rums are used in the bar's mixed drinks.

=== Rumbustion Society ===
Martin Cate created the Rumbustion Society rum club upon the bar's opening to encourage customers to explore the bar's rum offerings. The Rumbustion Society has three main levels: Disciple of the Cove, Guardian of the Cove, and Master of the Cove.

To become a Disciple of the Cove, participants must sample and learn about 20 rums and pass a 13-question quiz, earning them a Rumbustion Society card and a merit badge. The Guardian of the Cove level requires larger samples of 80 different rums, and awards entrants a commemorative placard and a red fez. To become a Master of the Cove, customers must sample an additional 200 rums, earning them a tiki mug and a private rum distillery tour.

The Black Tassel Brigade, an additional fourth level, requires sampling 500 different rums and earns entrants a black tassel for their fez. With only 25 members as of 2018, the Black Tassel Brigade was a late addition to the Rumbustion Society, as Cate initially did not expect customers to exceed the 200 rums demanded by the Disciple of the Cove level.

== Book ==
In 2016, Martin and Rebecca Cate published the bar's eponymous book Smuggler's Cove: Exotic Cocktails, Rum, and the Cult of Tiki at Ten Speed Press. The 352-page book chronicles the history and aesthetics of tiki culture, breaks down what defines an "exotic cocktail", and lists dozens of the bar's cocktail recipes, including both classics and original creations. It also provides recommendations for essential rums and tiki bars around the world, and offers a new categorization for rum varieties based on production method rather than country of origin.

The book was well-received upon its release. Paolo Lucchesi of the San Francisco Chronicle called it "an impressively extensive examination of all things tiki." In 2017, it received a James Beard Foundation Award for books in the beverage category.

Since its release, the book has persisted as an acclaimed tiki reference. In 2025, Bon Appétit listed it as one of the greatest cocktail books, noting its detailed coverage of tiki mixology and history, as well as "the stunning visuals that encourage a little playful escapism." In a 2025 review for The Dispatch, Michael Warren wrote: "The book has become a bible for anyone with an interest, from budding to fully blooming, in the strange but alluring world of tiki culture. A useful advertisement for the bar, Cate's book also serves as a terrific introduction to the history, techniques, and entertaining basics of the tiki life."

== Reception ==
Smuggler's Cove is routinely listed as one of the best and most prominent tiki bars in the United States and the world. In 2016, it was named the best bar in the United States by Tales of the Cocktail. It has been listed as one of The World's 50 Best Bars six times, every year between 2011 and 2016, with judges in 2014 writing, "A tribute to rum as much as it is a tribute to itself, Smuggler's Cove is fast becoming a global tiki reference point ... the often complex concoctions are made with expert skill."

The bar's rum program in particular has drawn praise, with Paolo Lucchesi writing in a 2016 article for the San Francisco Chronicle, "Smuggler's Cove might be the best rum bar in the country, if not the world." The decor was praised by The New York Times beverage writer Jordan Mackay, who commented that the bar's interior is more characterized by "classical seafaring" elements than a typical island-themed tiki bar, describing: "The dark-wood-paneled ground floor is surprisingly intimate, decorated like the interior of a ship—with thick ropes, a mermaid-like figurehead on the wall, and heavy beams. Old ship lamps, luminous glass fishing orbs, and illuminated, multicolored blowfish provide much of the lighting."

== See also ==
- Hale Pele – a tiki bar in Portland, Oregon, co-owned by Martin Cate
- Tonga Room – another prominent San Francisco tiki bar
