= Daniel Neofetou =

British writer (born 1989)

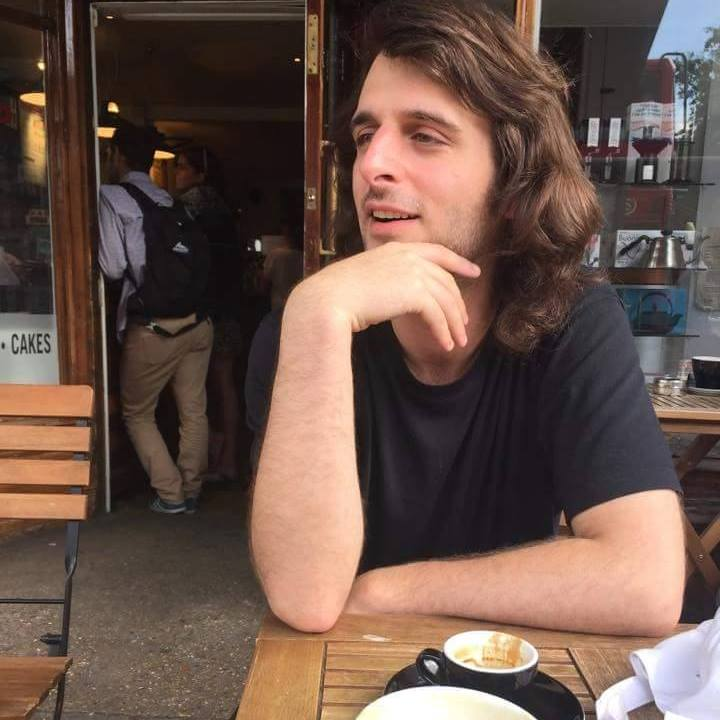
- Daniel Neofetou, May 2016
- Born: 1 February 1989 (age 37); Leamington Spa, England
- Education: Goldsmiths, University of London

Daniel Andreas Neofetou (born 1 February 1989) is a British theorist and filmmaker. He is the author of the books Good Day Today: David Lynch Destabilises the Spectator (2012) and Rereading Abstract Expressionism, Clement Greenberg and the Cold War (2021). He is a regular contributor to The Wire, Art Monthly and Artforum, and has written for Mute, Complex, Flash Art and Le Phare, the journal of Le Centre culturel suisse. He has also published academic journal articles in Journal of Contemporary Painting, Quarterly Review of Film and Video, Arts, Getty Research Journal and Philosophy & Social Criticism. He is currently a lecturer at Middlesex University.

== Early life ==
Neofetou was born in Leamington Spa, England on 1 February 1989. He studied at University of Warwick, University of Edinburgh and Goldsmiths, University of London, at which he completed a PhD entitled Eyes in the Heat: The Question Concerning Abstract Expressionism, initially under the supervision of Mark Fisher, and subsequently under the supervision of Josephine Berry and Marina Vishmidt.

== Career ==
His first book, a monograph on David Lynch entitled Good Day Today: David Lynch Destabilises the Spectator (2012), was published by Zero Books. In 2018, he curated Divine Cargo, an evening of performance art at South London Gallery. In 2018, he contributed to ‘The Annotated Reader’, a publication and exhibition curated by Ryan Gander. In early 2019, he contributed a short essay to the King's College London project "Technologically Fabricated Intimacy."

His second book, Rereading Abstract Expressionism, Clement Greenberg and the Cold War was published in October 2021 with Bloomsbury Publishing. In a review in Leonardo, Jan Baetens writes that it is 'an important contribution to the study of abstract expressionism' which provides 'very stimulating new interpretations of the discourses that have “made” abstract expressionism what it was.'

As a filmmaker, Neofetou wrote and directed the 2024 short film Promulgate, starring Sophie Cundale, which won the award of Best Low Budget Film in the third period of the 2024 Milano Indie Movie Awards, and screened in competition at the 2025 Lamezia International Film Festival. He also, alongside filmmaker Ralph Pritchard, co-wrote and directed the 2025 short film Collaborative Efforts, which was selected to screen at the 2026 Mammoth Lakes Film Festival.

== Bibliography ==
=== Books ===
- Rereading Abstract Expressionism, Clement Greenberg and the Cold War. Bloomsbury Visual Arts, 2021. ISBN 978-1-5013-5838-8
- Good Day Today: David Lynch Destabilises the Spectator. Zero Books, 2012. ISBN 978-1-7809-9767-4

=== Scholarly articles ===
- 'Greenberg After Duchamp: Postmodernism and the Meaning of Medium Specificity,' Selva: A Journal of the History of Art, 2025, 6, 105-121.
- 'The Flesh of Negation: Adorno and Merleau-Ponty contra Heidegger,' Philosophy & Social Criticism, January 2022, https://doi.org/10.1177/01914537211066852
- 'Greenberg's Marxism: Clement Greenberg's Unfinished Essay Draft on André Breton's "Political Position of Surrealism" (1935),' Getty Research Journal, 2021, 14:, 205–219, https://doi.org/10.1086/716587
- ‘Political Art Criticism and the Need for Theory,’ Arts, 2021, 10(1), 1; https://doi.org/10.3390/arts10010001
- ‘Laughing and Crying and Dancing: The Limits of Human Behaviour in Swing Time’, Quarterly Review of Film and Video, 38:6, pp. 541–558, https://doi.org/10.1080/10509208.2020.1780901
- ‘A world for us: On the prefiguration of reconciliation in Barnett Newman’s painting,’ Journal of Contemporary Painting, 2019, 5:1, pp. 147–61, https://doi.org/10.1386/jcp.5.1.147_1
