= Attaboy =

Attaboy or Atta Boy can refer to:

- Atta Boy, a 1926 American silent film
- Attaboy (bar), a craft cocktail bar in New York City
- "Attaboy", a song on Perfect Velvet by Red Velvet
- "Attaboy", a song on The Goat Rodeo Sessions by Yo-Yo Ma, Stuart Duncan, Edgar Meyer and Chris Thile

== See also ==
- Attaboy, Sam!
