= Tayēr + Elementary =

Bar in London, England

- Interactive map of Tayēr + Elementary

Restaurant information
- Location: London, England

Tayēr + Elementary is a bar in London, England. The bar is operated by Alex Kratena and Monica Berg.

== See also ==
- The World's 50 Best Bars
