= Restaurant & Bar Design Awards =

Annual British design and architecture award

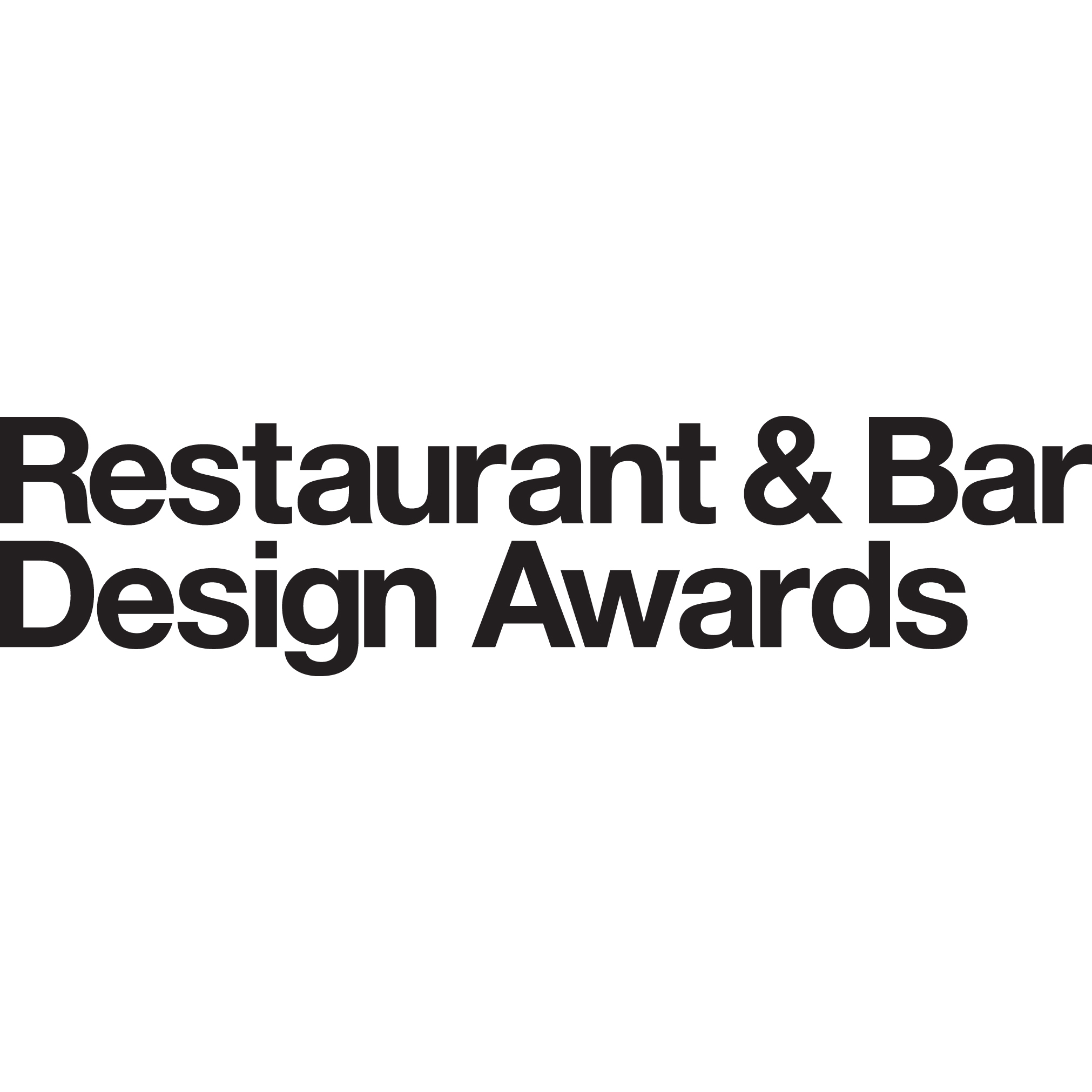
- Awarded for: The design of food and beverage spaces
- Country: United Kingdom
- First award: 2008
- Website: restaurantandbardesignawards.com

The Restaurant & Bar Design Awards, is an annual award dedicated to recognising the design and architecture of food and beverage spaces internationally. The Restaurant & Bar Design Awards is an independent award system, set up by Marco Rebora in 2008 in the United Kingdom with the encouragement of a panel of judges, including the editor-in-chief of Wallpaper*, Tony Chambers.

Since the first awards in 2009 there have been over 14,000 entries from design and architectural industries and hospitality organisations from 100 countries around the world.

Each year the awards are judged by a new panel of representatives from the fields of art, architecture, design and gastronomy. Notable judges have included Ian Callum, Mark Hix, Gerry Judah, Yotam Ottolenghi, Thomas Heatherwick, Julia Peyton-Jones and Karim Rashid. The winners are awarded at annual ceremonies at a chosen host venue affiliated with the award. In 2012 the ceremony was held at The Royal Institute of British Architects (RIBA).

Restaurant & Bar Design Awards organises a year-round programme of events Internationally with an aim to build a network between entrants, judges, partners and sponsors.

In 2014 Taschen publications published a book, Restaurant & Bar Design dedicated to the ongoing work of the Awards.

== Categories ==
Each year the Restaurant & Bar Design Awards acknowledges five regional overall winners (Asia, Americas, Australia & Pacific, Europe and Middle East & Africa) and two overall winners under the categories of Best Bar and Best Restaurant in the world.

The number of additional category winners varies each year. The inaugural award in 2008/2009 was open to entrants from UK and identified nine category winners. In 2009/10 the awards became International and introduced two more category winners under the titles International Restaurant and International Bar. Since 2020/21 the awards have recognised category winners in each of the five regions whilst also having a number of sub-categories not defined by region.

== Overall Winners ==
- 2009
  - The Olde Bell Inn (Hurley, UK) / Studioilse
  - Carbon (London, UK) / B3 Designers
- 2010
  - Galvin La Chapelle (London, UK) / DesignLSM
  - The Tote (India) / Serie Architects
- 2011
  - Busaba Eathai (Bicester, UK) / David Archer Architects
  - Smack (Leamington Spa, UK) / Steve Smith & Adrian Baynes
- 2012
  - A Cantina (Spain) / Estudio Nomada
  - Graffiti (Bulgaria) / Studio Mode
- 2013
  - Höst (Denmark) / NORM Architects
  - Atrium Champagne Bar (London, UK) / Foster and Partners
- 2014
  - FEI (China) / A.N.D.
  - Les Haras (France) / Jouin Manku
- 2015
  - Dandelyan (London, UK) / Design Research Studio
  - The Jane (Belgium) / Studio Piet Boon
- 2016
  - Blue Wave (Barcelona, Spain) / El Equipo Creativo
  - German Gymnasium (London, UK) / Conran & Partners
- 2017
  - Westlight (New York, USA) / Studio Munge
  - The Penny Drop (Melbourne, Australia) / Design by Golden
- 2018
  - Rosina (Las Vegas, USA) / Simeone Deary Design Group under a consulting agreement with Gensler
  - Sean Connolly (Dubai, UAE) / Alexander & Co
- 2019
  - SPINE Beirut (Beirut, Lebanon) / Gatserelia Design
  - Alice & Fifth (Johannesburg, South Africa) / TristanPlessisStudio
- 2020
  - Garden Hotpot (Chengdu, China) / MUDA-Architects
  - INNS Bar (Chengdu, China) / Wooton Designers
- 2021
  - Leña at Hotel Puente Romano (Marbella, Spain) / Astet Studio
  - More 7 Bar at The Linow Hotel (Xi'an, China) / Republican Metropolis Architecture
- 2022
  - 1111 Ones (Hong Kong, China) / M.R. Studio
  - Curious at W Melbourne (Melbourne, Australia) / Hachem
- 2023
  - Cicchetti (London, UK) / Fettle Design
  - Luma (Adelaide, Australia) / Hachem
- 2024
  - Coffee Bar (Haikou, China) / One Plus Partnership
  - Title (Sharq, Kuwait) / Lines
- 2025
  - Suparnin (Guangzhou, China) / Republican Metropolis Architecture
  - LITT (Dubai, UAE) / Verhaal
- 2026
  - Carbone Riviera (Las Vegas, USA) / MBDS
  - Saikindō (Abu Dhabi, UAE) / AvroKo
