= Double Chicken Please =

Bar in New York City

- Interactive map of Double Chicken Please

Restaurant information
- Established: 2020
- Owners: GN Chan and Faye Chan
- Chef: Mark Chou
- Food type: Cocktail Bar; Taiwanese
- Dress code: Casual
- Location: 115 Allen Street, New York, New York, 10002, United States
- Coordinates: 40°43′10.6″N 73°59′25.8″W
- Seating capacity: 35 (front/The Front Room) 55 (back/The Coop)
- Reservations: none (Free Range,) recommended (The Coop)
- Website: doublechickenplease.com

Double Chicken Please or DCP is a bar on the Lower East Side of Manhattan in New York City. The bar was established in 2020 and was ranked as the 2nd best bar in the world on 2023's The World's 50 Best Bars. The bar has two sections: a front walk-in space called Free Range and a virtually reservation-only back called The Coop due to its popularity. Free Range serves cocktails on tap, or in other words, draft cocktails, while The Coop serves craft cocktails inspired by dishes such as Japanese cold soba, key lime pie, and mango sticky rice, as well as riffs on classic cocktails. Along with said cocktails, the restaurant offers a different menu for each section, with Free Range mainly featuring small bites, such as modern interpretations of Taiwanese dishes like ti-hoeh-koé, or pig's blood cake, and a chicken wing rice roll. The Coop primarily features Taiwanese inspired fried chicken sandwiches with unique crusts, such as with salted egg yolk or mochi. Outside of their signature, the back offers other bites, such as said chicken in a standard "popcorn" form, and chicken liver mousse with coffee butter, among others.

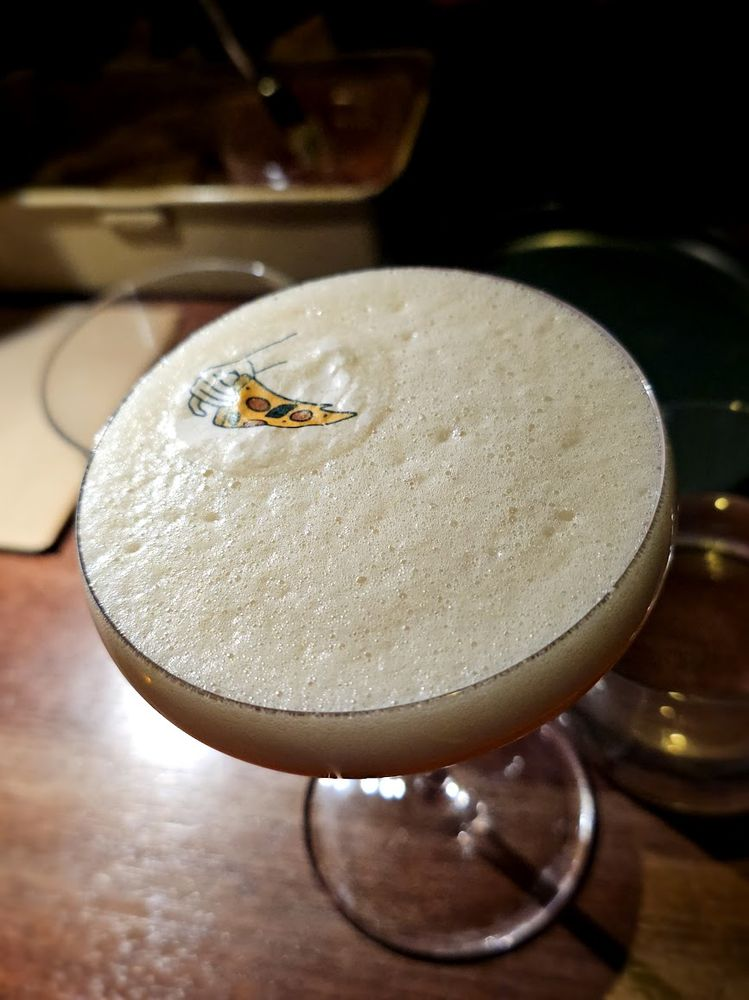
Cold Pizza-Don Fulano Blanco, parmigiano reggiano, burnt toast, tomato, basil, honey, and egg white. From the back room; The Coop.

== See also ==
- The World's 50 Best Bars
