= Nightjar (bar) =

Bar in London, England

Nightjar is a bar in London, England. There are two locations.

Time Out has described one of the locations as a "dazzling subterranean speakeasy".

== See also ==
- The World's 50 Best Bars
