= Bar Leone =

Drinking establishment in Hong Kong

Restaurant information
- Location: Hong Kong

Bar Leone is an Italian-themed bar in Hong Kong. It opened in June 2023. Lorenzo Antinori is a co-founder.

The Hollywood Reporter has called Bar Leone "arguably the best bar in Hong Kong".

It was ranked #1 in The World's 50 Best Bars and Asia's best bar in 2025 and 2026.

== See also ==
- The World's 50 Best Bars
