= Handshake Speakeasy =

Bar in Mexico City, Mexico

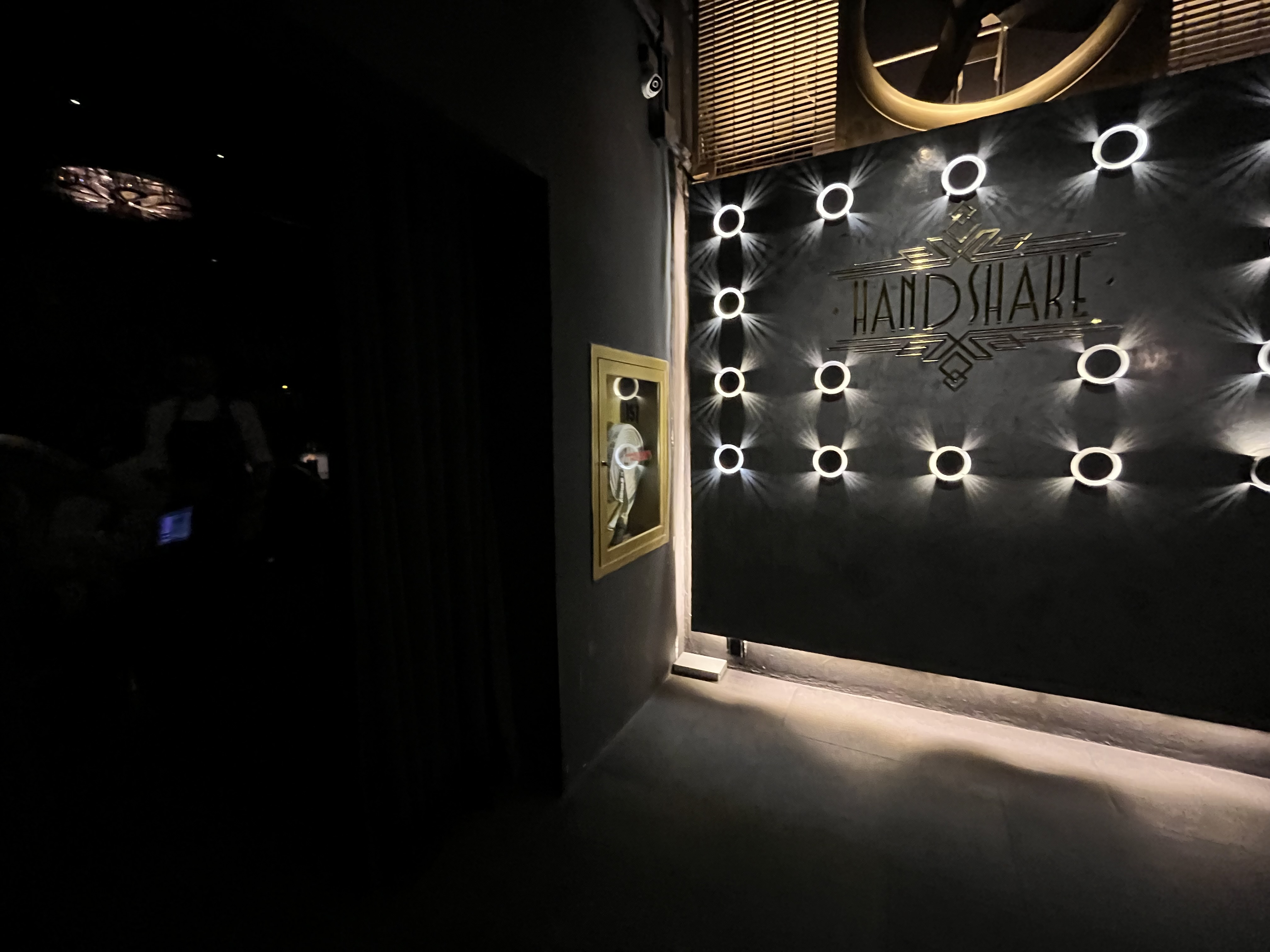
- Interactive map of Handshake Speakeasy

Restaurant information
- Location: Calle Amberes 65, Mexico City, Mexico
- Coordinates: 19°25′28″N 99°09′53″W

Handshake Speakeasy is a bar in Mexico City, Mexico. It has ranked second in North America's 50 Best Bars list twice. It was voted the best bar in 2024.

== See also ==
- The World's 50 Best Bars
