= Dante (bar) =

Cafe and cocktail bar in New York City, U.S.

Coordinates: 40°43′44″N 74°0′6″W

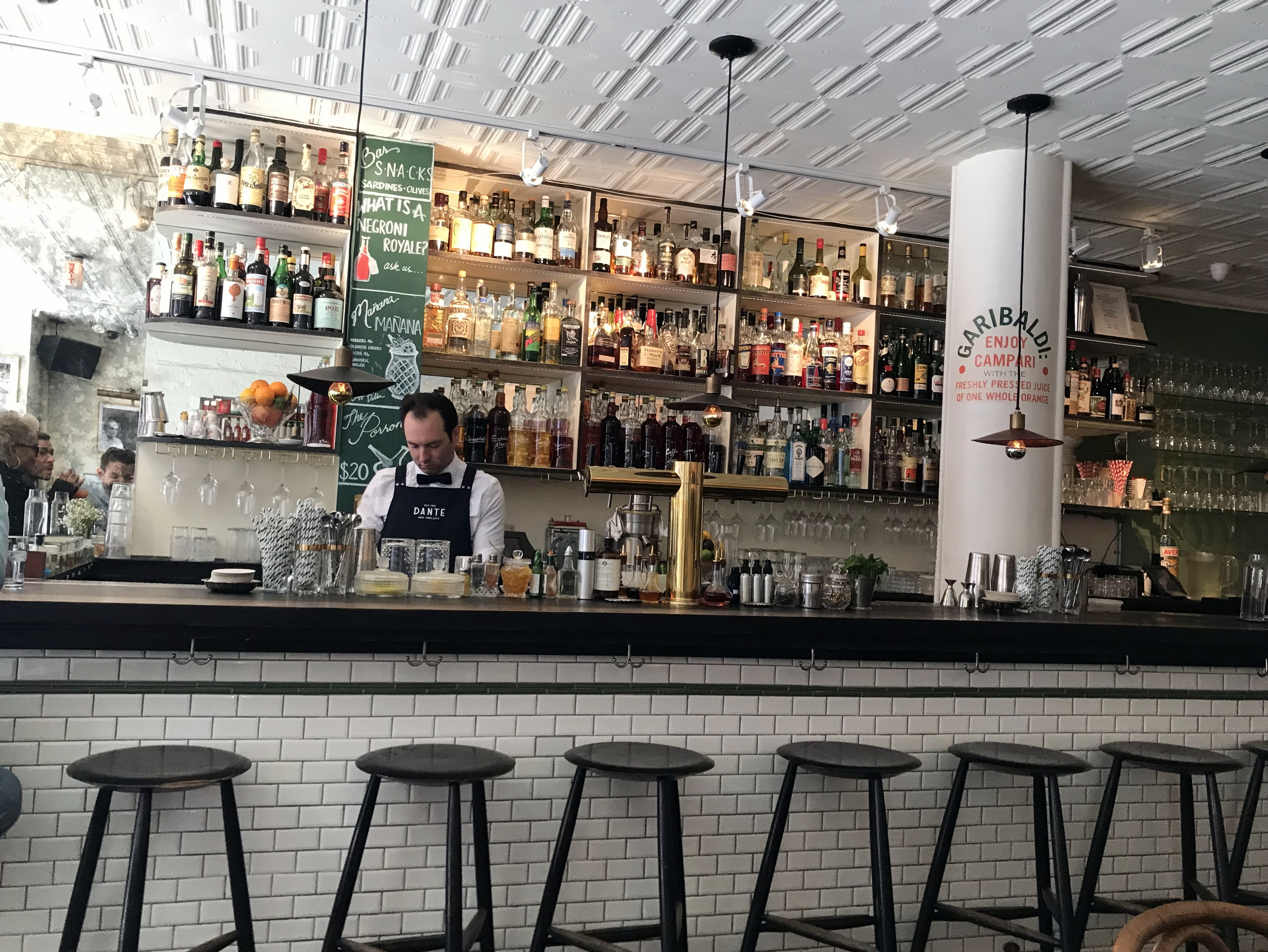
The cocktail bar counter at Dante

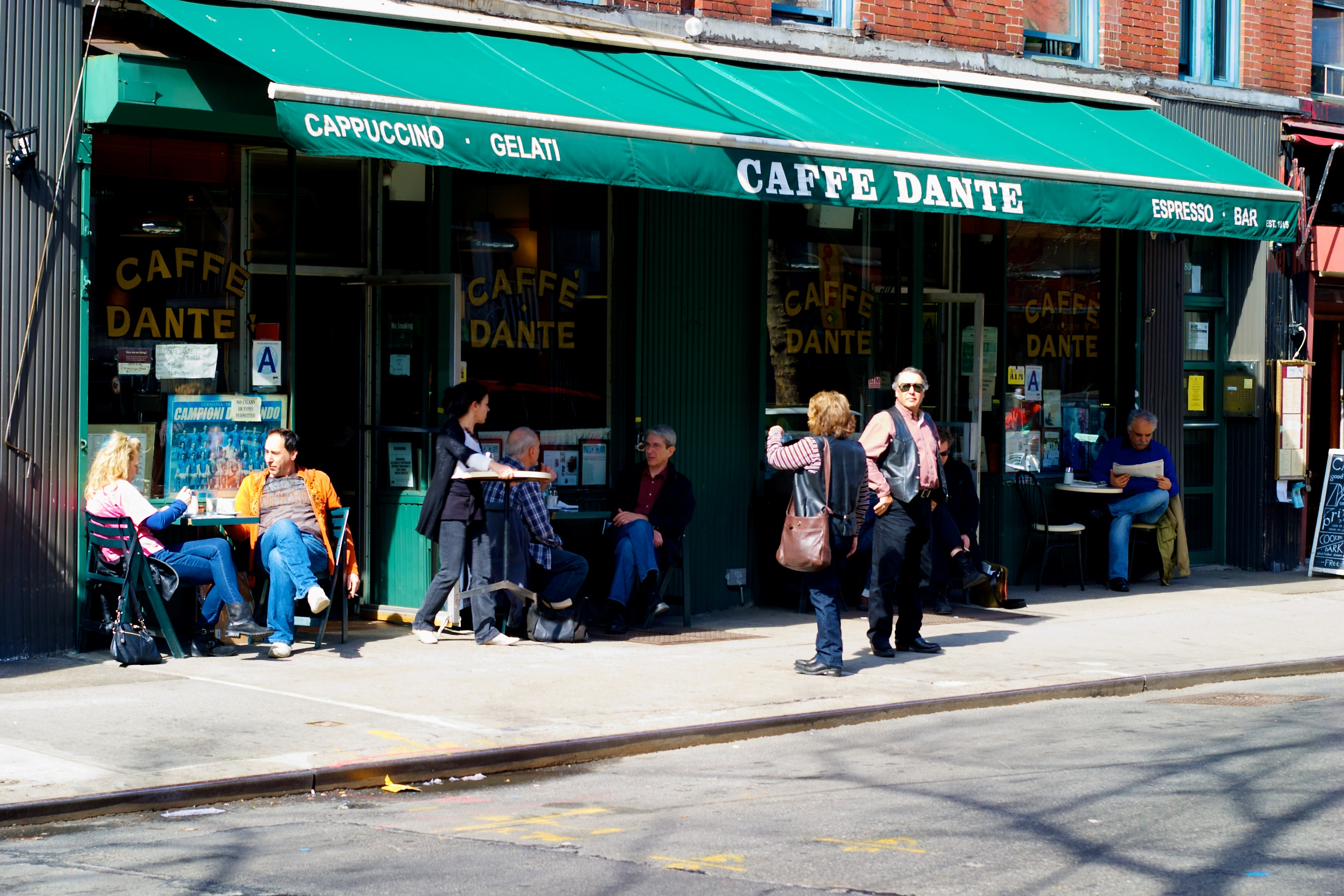
The cafe in 2012, prior to renovation

Dante, also known as Dante NYC, is a cafe and craft cocktail bar in the Greenwich Village neighborhood of Manhattan. The establishment was founded in 1915 as Caffé Dante, an Italian coffeehouse. It was rated the best bar in the world in 2019, in The World's 50 Best Bars publication.

Caffé Dante was a favorite of mobsters Vinnie “the Chin” Gigante and Jimmy Lollipops.

== Attributes ==
The bar and cafe serves coffee, croissants, and fresh banana bread in the morning. At lunchtime, the establishments serves several types of panini. In the eveningtime, its cocktail bar serves Italian cocktails like negronis, spritzes, Americanos, and Garibaldis, though it also offers other classic cocktails and variations of them.

At the back of the cafe is the kitchen, where chef Angel Fernandez prepares dishes including fresh pastas, roast chicken, and apple tarts.

== History ==
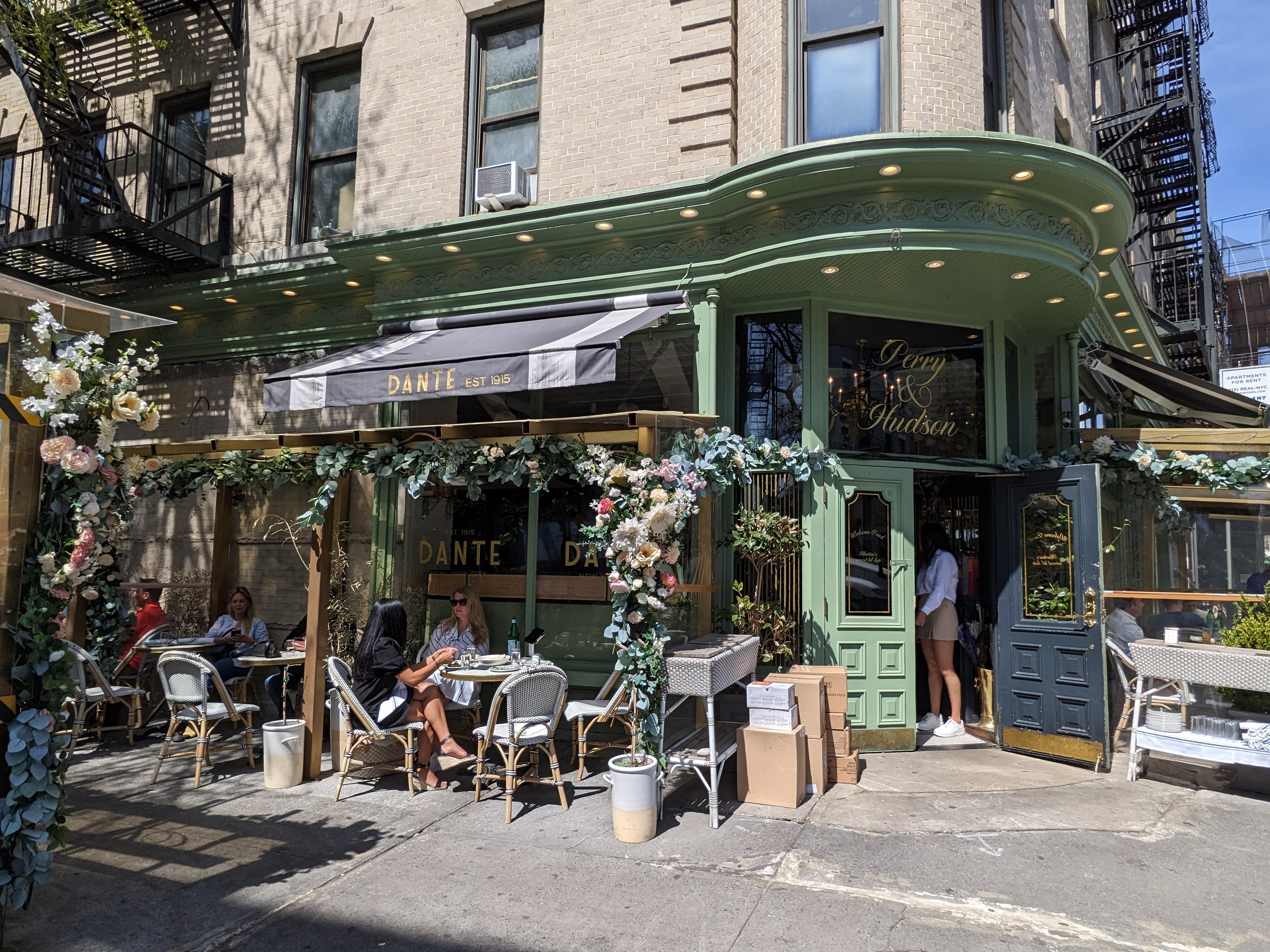
Dante West Village

The cafe opened in 1915 in an area with innumerous Italian immigrants; the period between 1900 and 1914 saw two million immigrants from Italy arrive in New York City, about half of whom settled down in the city. The earliest owners of the cafe are now unknown. Mario Flotta purchased the cafe in 1971.

The bar is currently operated by co-owners, Linden Pride along with his wife Nathalie Hudson, both from Sydney, Australia, who married and settled in the West Village in 2013 and purchased the old Caffé Dante in 2015. With financial backing from James Symond and Sydney publican Chris Cheung. They added new pressed-tin ceilings, close in pattern to the original, new paint (originally dark green, repainted a brighter cream color), and brought pictures and a mirror from their home. Some photographs added show Caffe Dante in earlier years, including one of the former owner Mario Flotta. The bar retained an original Caffé Dante sign, hanging above Macdougal Street.

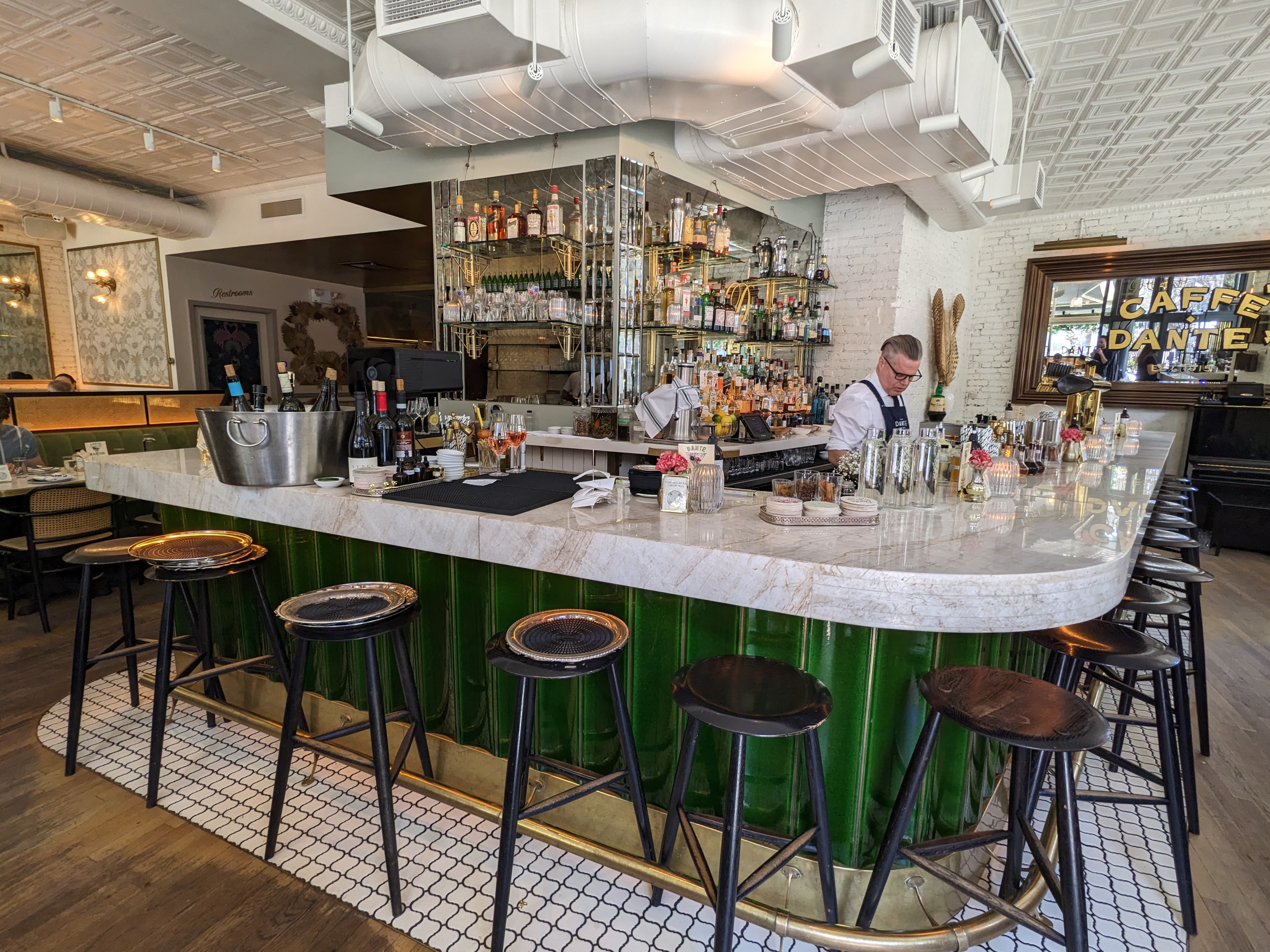
Bar counter at Dante West Village

During the COVID-19 pandemic, the bar closed down for dining, and offered food and cocktails for pickup and for delivery. Dante also sent out about 4,000 meals to staff at hospitals in the city.

In 2020, the owners opened Dante West Village, a sister location with a similar atmosphere, though a focus on its wood-fire grill and charcoal oven. The location was originally scheduled to open the day the city locked down.
