= Sophie Cundale =

British artist

- Born: 1987 (age 38–39)
- Education: Slade School of Fine Art
- Occupations: Artist, filmmaker
- Website: sophiecundale.net

Sophie Cundale (born 1987) is a British artist who lives and works in London, England. Cundale studied at the Slade School of Fine Art and works across film, performance, sculpture and writing.

== Works ==
In 2016, the Serpentine Galleries commissioned her film After Picasso, God. The 42 minute film sees a woman (played by Cundale) visit a hypnotist to address an unwanted addiction. The title refers to the artist Dora Maar, Picasso’s lover and muse, who after the break-up of their affair, declared: “After Picasso, Only God.”

In 2020, Cundale’s solo exhibition The Near Room premiered at South London Gallery and later traveled to Bonington Gallery, Nottingham. The Near Room is a film about the aftermath of grief that follows the journey of a professional boxer after a near-fatal knockout. The boxer's disorientations become entangled with the story of a queen living with Cotard Delusion, a rare neurological condition inducing the belief in and sensation of death. The film stars artist Penny Goring, Actor Chris New, boxer John Harding Jnr and trainer Mark Tibbs. It received reviews in The Guardian and was commissioned by film and video umbrella.

Half Life (2022–present) is an erotic science fiction novel centred on Pearl, a scientist who develops an infatuation with radioactive waste. The work was first presented as a performance at the Energy Cultures Conference at Castello di Rivoli. In 2024, Chapters 1–4 were commissioned and published as an audio work by Castello di Rivoli, and in 2025 the project was presented as a sound installation at the Industrial Art Biennale. A conversation about the work with curator of the project Giulia Coletti appears in Cura.

=== Performances and films ===
- Doubles (2025) performance with writer Izabella Scott, Barbican Centre
- Memoirs of Amplexus (2025) as part of 'Yay, to have a mouth!' Ginny on Frederick and Rose Easton, London
- Guinea Pig (2025) performance with artist Lewis Walker as part of Future Fantasies: Intimacy and Fiction, Somerset House, London
- Half Life (2023) performance at Energy Cultures Conference, Nuclear horizons of the planet, Castello Di Rivoli, Turin
- The Near Room (2020) film, South London Gallery and Bonington Gallery
- After Picasso, God (2016) film, Serpentine Cinema, Innsbruck Biennale, Govett-Brewster Gallery, Spike Island, Temporary Gallery
- Prologue (2013) film, Chisenhale Gallery
- The Garden (2011) Serpentine Gallery Garden Marathon, London, screening and performance

=== Group shows and biennales ===
- Industrial Art Biennale (2025) Labin, Croatia
- Duo show with Penny Goring (2021) Kapp Kapp Gallery
- Innsbruck International Art Biennale (2018)
- AMINI (2017) Festival of Artist Moving Image Northern Island
- The Minstrel and Chronicle (2011) Hannah Barry Gallery, Peckham, London
