= Katana Kitten =

Bar in New York City, U.S.

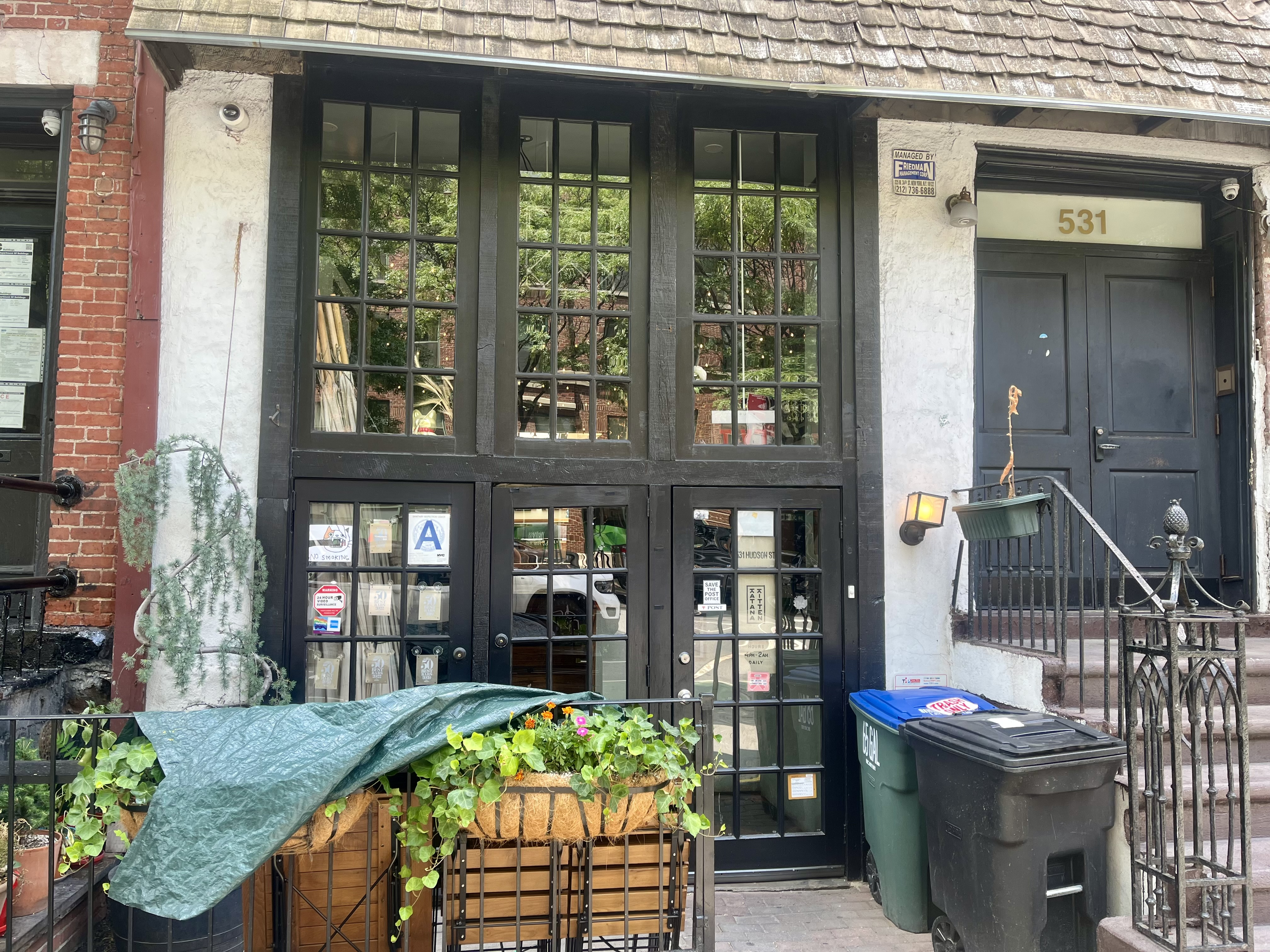
- The bar's exterior in 2024
- Interactive map of Katana Kitten
- Address: 531 Hudson Street
- Location: New York City, New York, United States
- Coordinates: 40°44′03″N 74°00′23″W

Katana Kitten is a bar in New York City.

== See also ==
- The World's 50 Best Bars
