= Mute (magazine) =

British culture and technology magazine

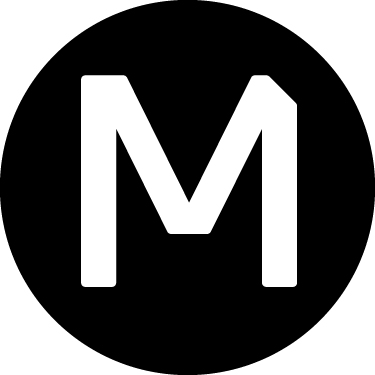

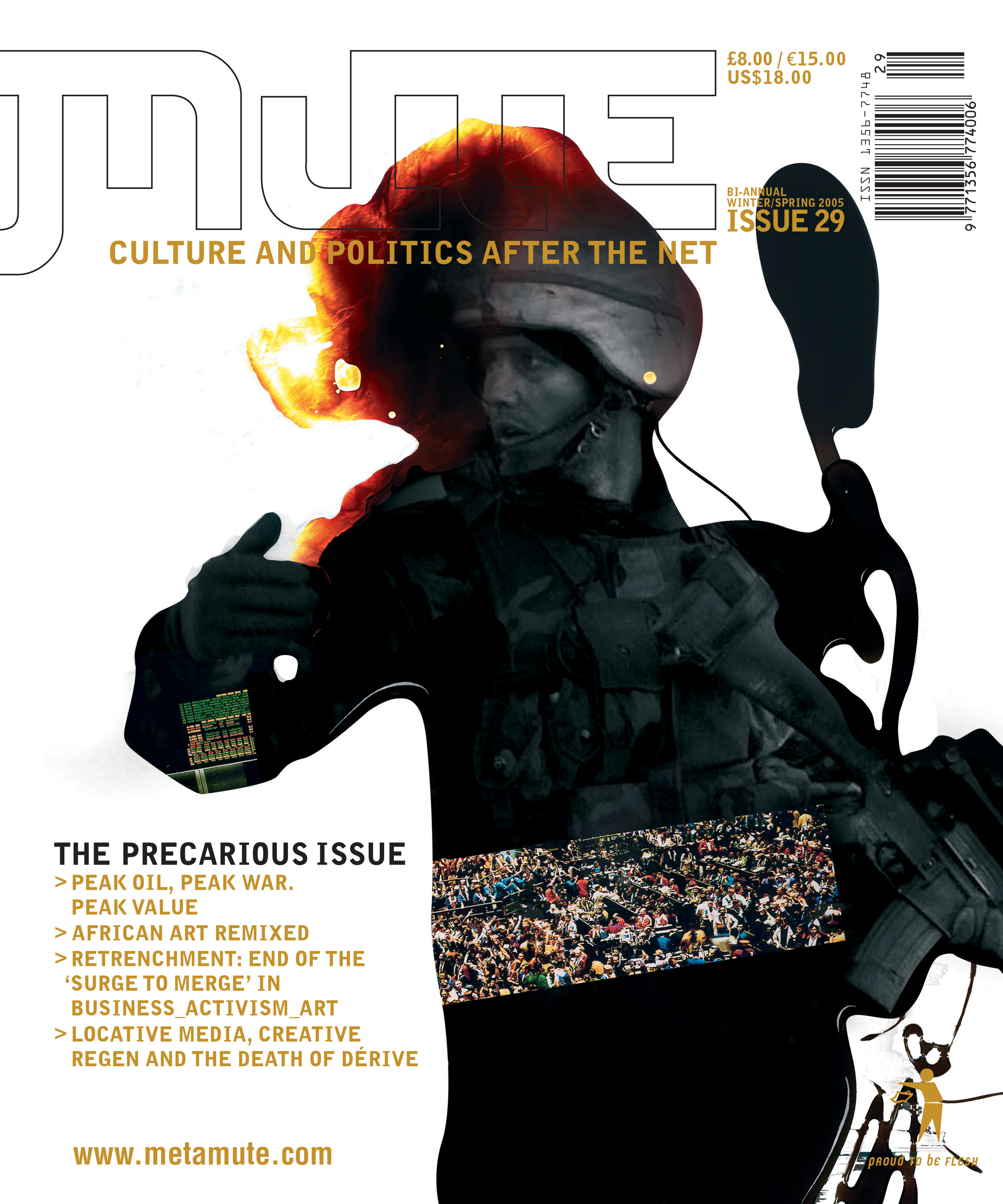
- Mute magazine - Issue 29 cover 2005-02, ISSN 1356-7748-29
- Categories: culture, technology, digital, politics
- Frequency: Quarterly
- Publisher: Simon Worthington and Pauline van Mourik Broekman
- Founder: Simon Worthington and Pauline van Mourik Broekman
- Founded: 1994
- First issue: 30 November 1994
- Company: Mute Publishing
- Country: United Kingdom
- Based in: London
- Language: English
- Website: www.metamute.org
- ISSN: 1356-7748
- OCLC: 1420978937

Mute is a British online magazine that covers a wide spectrum of subjects related to cyberculture, artistic practice, left-wing politics, urban regeneration, biopolitics, direct democracy, net art, the commons, horizontality and UK arts.

Founded in 1994 by art school graduates Simon Worthington and Pauline van Mourik Broekman, the magazine is an experimental hybrid of web and print formats, publishing articles weekly online, contributed by both staff and readers, and a biannual print compilation combining selections from current issues and other online content with specially commissioned and co-published projects. Contributors to Mute have included Heath Bunting, James Flint, Hari Kunzru, Anthony Davies and Simon Ford, Stewart Home, Kate Rich, Jamie King, Daniel Neofetou, Nils Norman, Simon Tyszko, and Peter Linebaugh. The magazine was supported by the Arts Council of England from 1999 to 2012.

In 2009, the magazine produced an anthology, Proud to be Flesh: A Mute Magazine Anthology of Cultural Politics After the Net (ISBN 978-1-906496-28-9), published by Autonomedia.
