= Licorería Limantour =

Bar in Mexico City, Mexico

Coordinates: 19°25′05″N 99°09′34″W

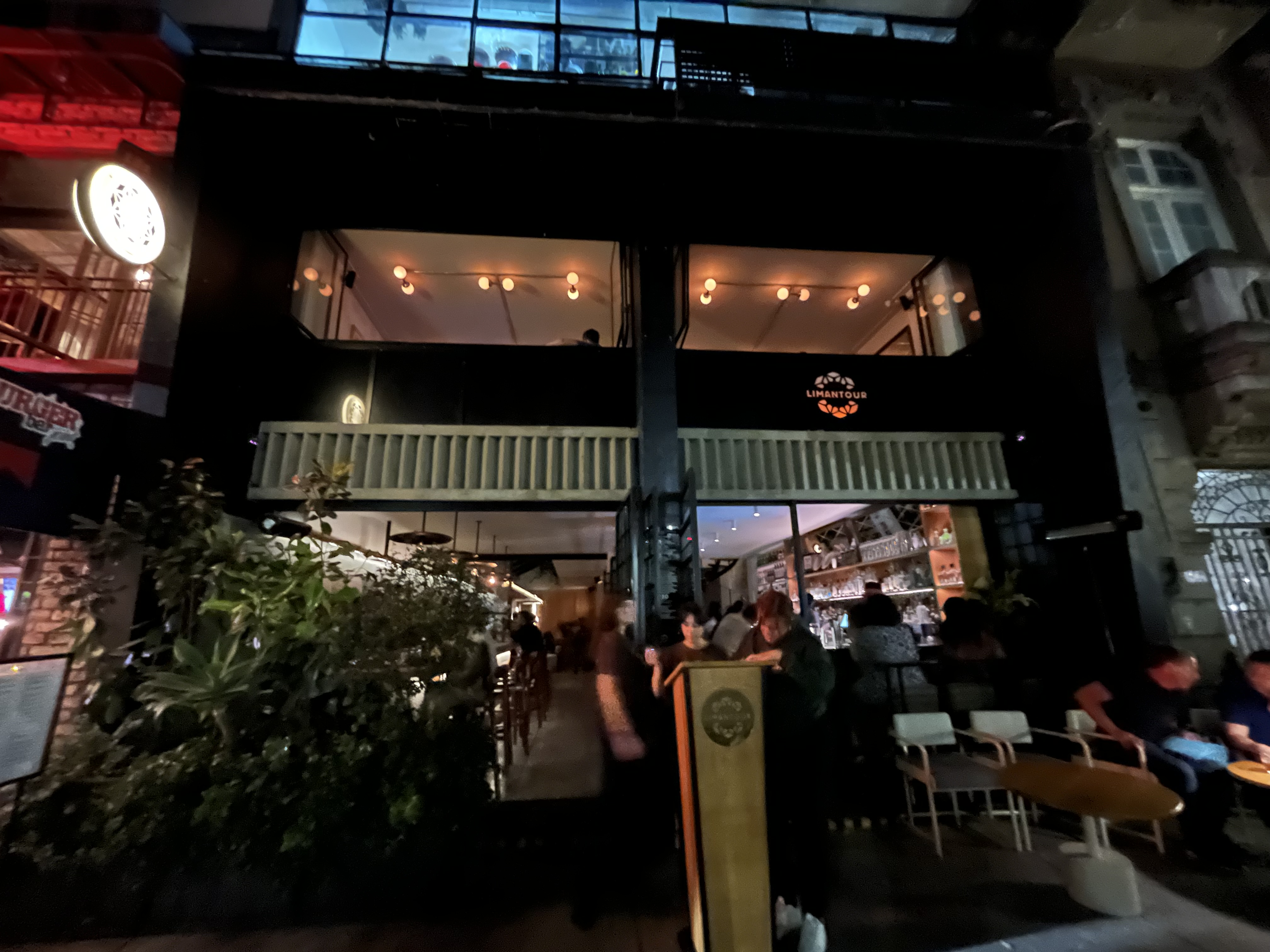
- Interactive map of Licorería Limantour

Restaurant information
- Location: Mexico City, Mexico

Licorería Limantour is a bar in Mexico City, Mexico. It opened in 2011.

== See also ==
- The World's 50 Best Bars
