= Dandelyan =

Bar in London, England, 2014 to 2018

Restaurant information
- Established: 2014
- Closed: 2018
- Location: London, England

Dandelyan was a bar in London, England. Ryan Chetiyawardana opened the bar in 2014.

In 2018, the business announced plans to close permanently.

The bar's menus were designed by Magpie Studio.

== See also ==
- The World's 50 Best Bars
