= The World's 50 Best Bars =

Annually released list of bars

The World's 50 Best Bars is an annual list that celebrates the best of the international drinks scene, providing a yearly ranking of bars, voted for by more than 650 drinks experts from across the globe.

== History ==
The list was first announced in 2009, with annual award ceremonies held in London since the inaugural event in 2012. In 2022, the ceremony moved for the first time from London to Barcelona. Incorporating grand hotel bars, secretive speakeasies, quirky salons and dive bars, The World's 50 Best Bars list aims to celebrate the diversity and universality of the drinks culture and to reflect new bar scenes developing all over the world. The World's 50 Best Bars is owned and organised by William Reed Ltd, the group behind The World's 50 Best Restaurants. William Reed is solely responsible for organising the awards, collating the votes, and producing the lists. None of the employees of the organiser or any of the sponsors associated with the awards, including the main sponsor, has any influence over the results.

In 2016, The World's 50 Best Bars brand was extended with the launch of Asia's 50 Best Bars, the first regional Bars award for the brand. A second regional list, North America's 50 Best Bars, was launched in 2022. A third regional list, Europe's 50 Best Bars, was launched in 2026.

== The voting process ==
The list is compiled by votes from The World's 50 Best Bars Academy, which consists of more than 650 drinks experts with 50/50 gender parity, including renowned bartenders, consultants, drinks writers, and cocktail specialists from around the world. The Academy of voters is spread across 28 global geographic regions, each headed by an Academy Chair who selects their region's voters, with the distribution of voters designed to reflect the relative development and sophistication of the drinks sector, and the concentration of quality bars, in each region. Voters are required to remain anonymous and voting is confidential, secure and independently adjudicated by Deloitte.

== The World's Best Bars ==
World's Best Bars
Year	1st	2nd	3rd
2009	(England) Milk & Honey London	(United States) Milk & Honey NYC	(France) Buddha Bar
2010	(England) Milk & Honey London	(United States) PDT (Please Don't Tell)	(Italy) Harry's Bar
2011	(United States) PDT (Please Don't Tell)	(England) The Connaught Bar	(England) Artesian
2012	(England) Artesian	(United States) PDT (Please Don't Tell)	(England) Nightjar
2013	(England) Artesian	(England) Nightjar	(Japan) High Five
2014	(England) Artesian	(United States) The Dead Rabbit	(England) Nightjar
2015	(England) Artesian	(United States) The Dead Rabbit	(England) Nightjar
2016	(United States) The Dead Rabbit	(England) The American Bar	(England) Dandelyan
2017	(England) The American Bar	(England) Dandelyan	(United States) The NoMad
2018	(England) Dandelyan	(England) The American Bar	(Singapore) Manhattan
2019	(United States) Dante NYC	(England) The Connaught Bar	(Argentina) Florería Atlántico
2020	(England) The Connaught Bar	(United States) Dante NYC	(Greece) The Clumsies
2021	(England) The Connaught Bar	(England) Tayēr + Elementary	(Spain) Paradiso
2022	(Spain) Paradiso	(England) Tayēr + Elementary	(Spain) Sips
2023	(Spain) Sips	(United States) Double Chicken Please	(Mexico) Handshake Speakeasy
2024	(Mexico) Handshake Speakeasy	(Hong Kong) Bar Leone	(Spain) Sips
2025	(Hong Kong) Bar Leone	(Mexico) Handshake Speakeasy	(Spain) Sips

== Asia's 50 Best Bars ==
Asia's Best Bars
Year	1st	2nd	3rd
2016	(Singapore) 28 HongKong Street	(China) Speak Low	(Japan) High Five
2017	(Singapore) Manhattan	(China) Speak Low	(Japan) High Five
2018	(Singapore) Manhattan	(Taiwan) Indulge Experimental Bistro	(China) Speak Low
2019	(Hong Kong) The Old Man	(Singapore) Manhattan	(Taiwan) Indulge Experimental Bistro
2020	(Singapore) Jigger & Pony	(Hong Kong) The Old Man	(Hong Kong) Coa
2021	(Hong Kong) Coa	(Singapore) Jigger & Pony	(Japan) The SG Club
2022	(Hong Kong) Coa	(Singapore) Jigger & Pony	(Hong Kong) Argo
2023	(Hong Kong) Coa	(Singapore) Jigger & Pony	(Thailand) BKK Social Club
2024	(Hong Kong) Bar Leone	(South Korea) Zest	(Singapore) Jigger & Pony
2025	(Hong Kong) Bar Leone	(South Korea) Zest	(Singapore) Jigger & Pony

== North America's 50 Best Bars ==
North America's Best Bars
Year	1st	2nd	3rd
2022	(United States) Attaboy	(Mexico) Handshake Speakeasy	(Mexico) Licorería Limantour
2023	(United States) Double Chicken Please	(Mexico) Handshake Speakeasy	(United States) Katana Kitten
2024	(Mexico) Handshake Speakeasy	(United States) Superbueno	(Mexico) Tlecān
2025	(Mexico) Handshake Speakeasy	(United States) Superbueno	(Mexico) Tlecān
2026	(United States) Sip & Guzzle	(Mexico) Bar Mauro	(United States) Bar Snack

== Europe's 50 Best Bars ==
North America's Best Bars
Year	1st	2nd	3rd
2026	(Greece) Line	(Greece) The Bar in Front of the Bar	(Spain) Sips

== See also ==
- List of food and drink awards
- The World's 50 Best Restaurants
- List of bars
