= Attaboy (bar) =

Cocktail bar in New York City

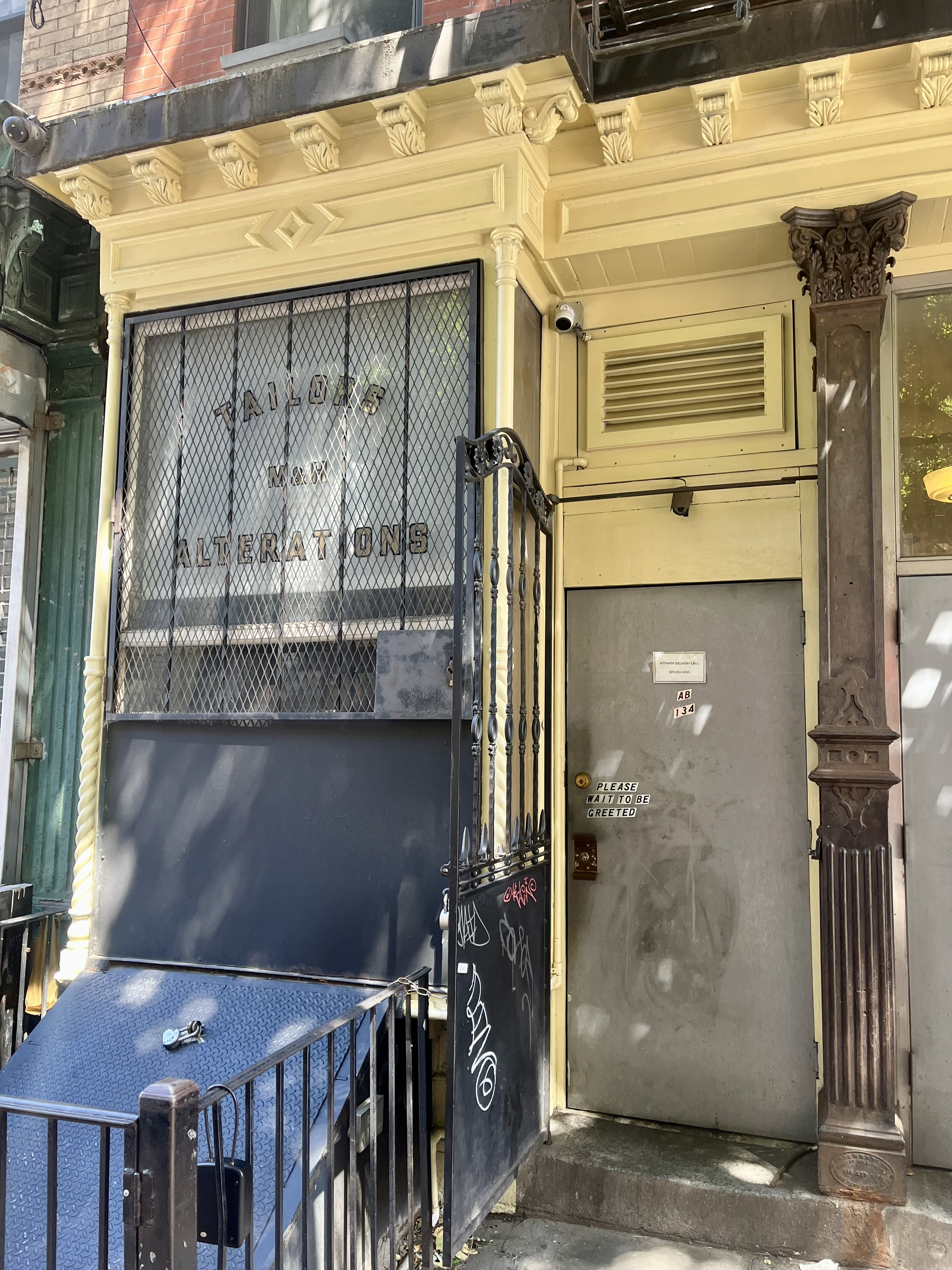
- The bar's exterior in 2024
- Interactive map of Attaboy

Restaurant information
- Established: 2012
- Location: 134 Eldridge St., Manhattan, New York City
- Coordinates: 40.718909°N 73.991477°W
- Website: attaboy.us/nyc/

Attaboy is a craft cocktail bar on the Lower East Side of Manhattan in New York City. The bar has had an outsized influence on the bar industry globally, regionally, and in New York City.

== Attributes ==
Attaboy occupies a small space, seating 28 people. The bar may be the smallest in New York City.

The bar does not have a sign outside, nor menus inside. The bar makes cocktails for its patrons based on the flavors and spirits they enjoy.

The owners and bartenders have created numerous modern classics at the bar, including Sam Ross with the Penicillin and Paper Plane, Michael McIlroy with the Greenpoint (containing whiskey, yellow chartreuse, and sweet vermouth). and Matty Clark with the Base Camp, a smoky bourbon cocktail.

== History ==
The bar opened in 2012 in the first location of Milk & Honey, a pioneering speakeasy that moved to the Flatiron District that year. Sam Ross and Michael McIlroy, reopened the bar as Attaboy.

The renovation to create Attaboy required some alterations – pressed tin on the ceiling and walls had to be removed, the three front booths were taken out, and the bar was lengthened to accommodate 12 stools.

In the 2010s, the bar opened a branch in Nashville, Tennessee, with the same name. That bar was nominated for a James Beard Foundation Award in 2022.

Attaboy NYC expanded into the space next door in 2025 and on weekends guests have access to twice as much Attaboy for a total of 58 seats in two bars that mirror each other and are separated by a residential hallway. During the week the Attaboy expansion offers cocktail classes taught by veteran Attaboy bartenders, and it can be booked for private parties.

== Reception ==
The bar has been consistently considered one of the best cocktail establishments in the U.S. In 2022, the bar was named the best in North America, according to the World's 50 Best Bars. This was the first year for North America's 50 Best Bars, a ranking by the same organization.
