= Bonington Gallery =

- Established: 1969
- Location: Nottingham, England
- Type: Contemporary art gallery
- Website: www.boningtongallery.co.uk

Bonington Gallery is a public contemporary art gallery located within the Nottingham School of Art and Design at Nottingham Trent University (NTU) in Nottingham, England. Founded in 1969, the gallery has been a part of Nottingham’s cultural landscape for over fifty years, presenting exhibitions and public programmes featuring local, national, and international artists.

The gallery hosts an annual programme of exhibitions, film screenings, talks, workshops, and live events. All exhibitions and events are free and open to the public.

== History ==
Bonington Gallery was established in 1969 and is housed within the Bonington Building on Nottingham Trent University’s City Campus. The building was officially opened on 14 October 1969 by Her Royal Highness the Duchess of Kent.

The gallery has a national reputation for presenting ambitious and diverse contemporary art programmes, contributing to the cultural life of Nottingham and the wider region.

== Location and facilities ==
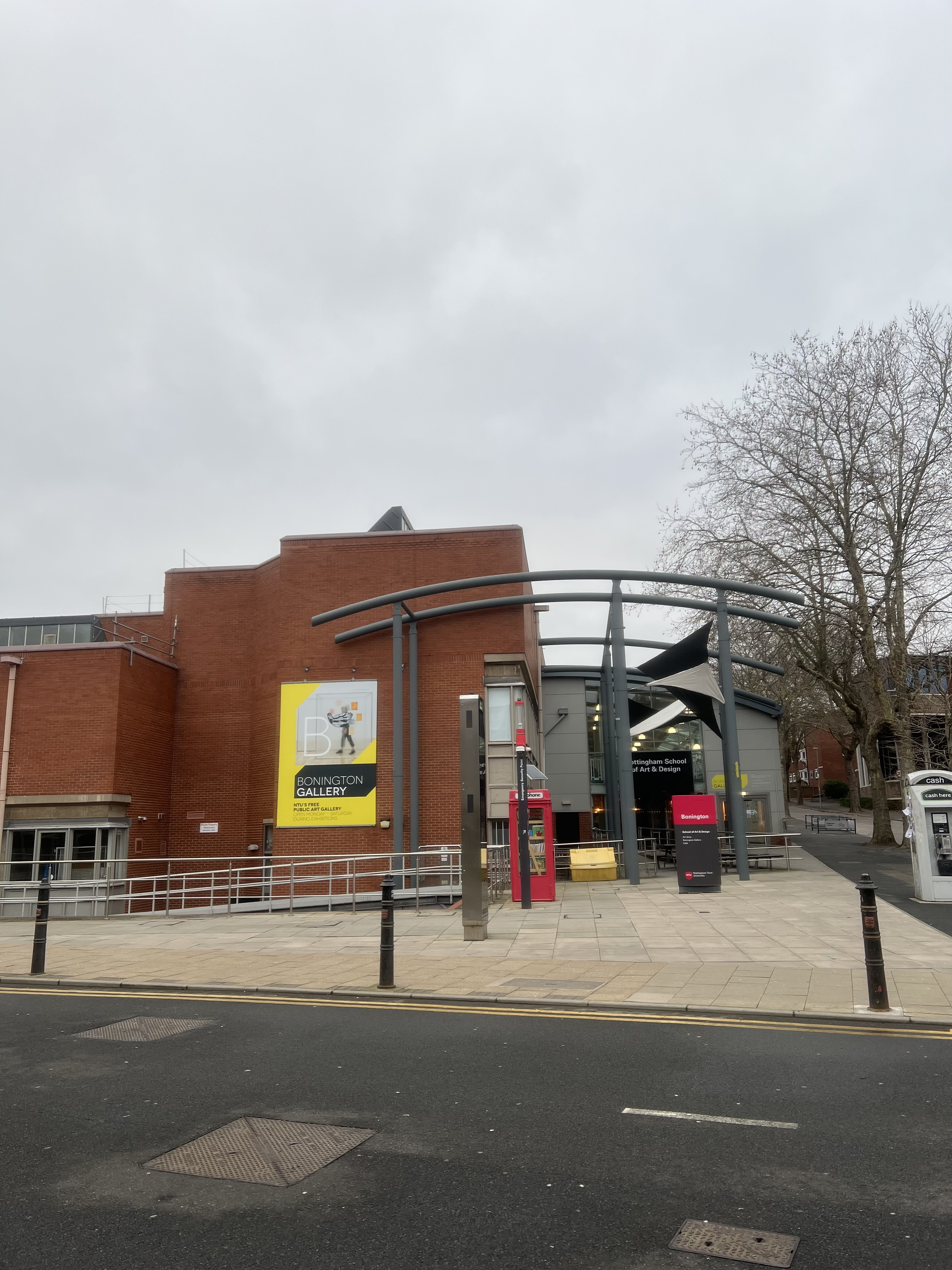
Bonington Gallery

The gallery is situated at the heart of Nottingham Trent University’s School of Art & Design, providing a public gallery space within an educational environment.

Facilities within the Bonington Building include:

- The main gallery space
- Bonington Vitrines, a series of micro-exhibitions presented in display cases
- A cabinet showcasing highlights from the gallery’s archive
- Satellite exhibitions located in the building’s atrium

The building also houses Café Bonington, which is open to the public, and Boningtons Art Shop, a specialist art supplies shop operating during NTU term time.

== Programme and exhibitions ==
Bonington Gallery presents a year-round programme of exhibitions and events. Past exhibitions have featured work by artists including Hetain Patel, Frank Stella, Tacita Dean, Permindar Kaur, Sonia Boyce, Isaac Julien, Steve McQueen, Glenn Ligon, and Andrew Logan.

In addition to its main exhibitions, the gallery produces focused projects through the Bonington Vitrines series, which highlight emerging practices, historical research, and community-led narratives.

== Role in Nottingham’s art scene ==
Bonington Gallery holds a prominent position within Nottingham’s visual arts ecology. In 2015, the gallery collaborated with a steering group of local visual arts organisations to establish the Nottingham Art Map, an interactive website and printed guide promoting exhibitions and events across Nottingham’s galleries and artist-led spaces.

The gallery is also part of NTU Arts, Nottingham Trent University’s cultural programme aimed at engaging students, staff, and the local community with a wide range of cultural and creative activities.

== Access and public engagement ==
All exhibitions and events at Bonington Gallery are free and open to the public. The gallery operates both as a public cultural venue and as a learning resource for students at Nottingham Trent University.

The gallery maintains an independent website featuring information on current and forthcoming exhibitions and events, a blog, and an online archive of past programmes.
