= Coa (bar) =

Bar in Hong Kong

Coordinates: 22°17′02″N 114°09′08″E

COA
- Interactive map of COA

Restaurant information
- Established: 2017
- Owner: Jay Khan
- Food type: Bar
- Location: Shop A, LG/F Wah Shin House, 6-10 Shin Hing Street, Central District, Hong Kong, China
- Other locations: Shanghai
- Website: coa.com.hk

Coa is a bar in Hong Kong.
