= Hetain Patel =

English visual artist

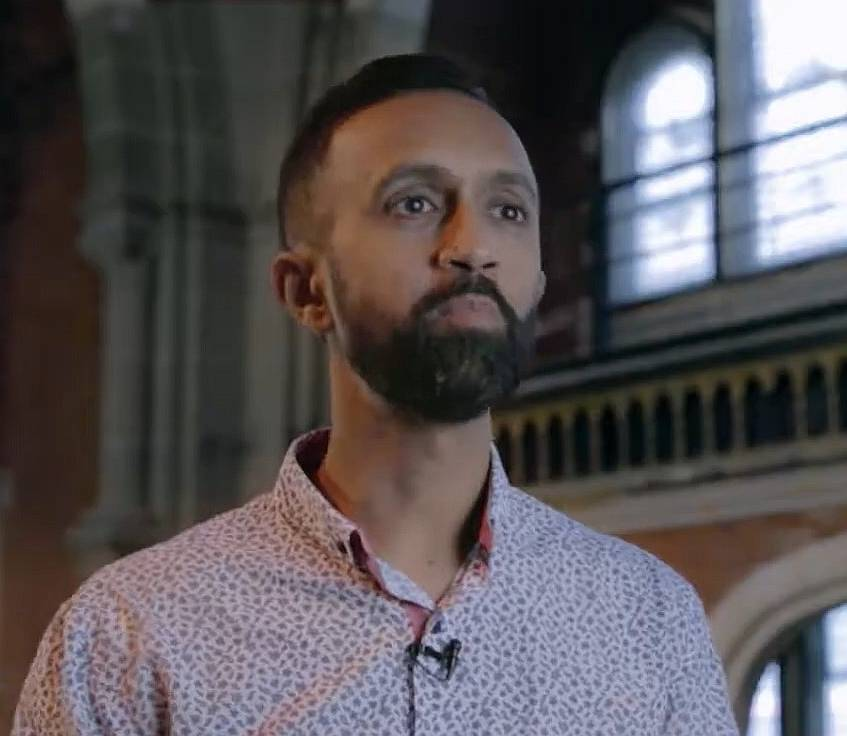
- Patel in 2017
- Born: 1980 (age 45–46)
- Website: http://www.hetainpatel.com/

Hetain Patel (born 1980) is an English visual artist specializing in performance, sculpture, video, and photography. His work has been exhibited in Norway, India, Belgium, and the United Kingdom.

== Early life and education ==
Patel was born and raised in a working class British Gujarati Asian household in Bolton, England. He was subjected to racial abuse, stating, "just walking from the house to the car was difficult." As a child, Patel developed an interest in superhero movies, playing as Spider-Man in his grandmother's house.

In addition to sci-fi and mainstream-influenced works (including work associated with pop-culture superheroes such as Spider-Man), Patel experiments with addressing problems of multiculturalism and self-acceptance. As Patel became older, his father, who worked at a day job converting cars, inspired him to create his first sculpture. Patel converted his first car, which was gifted by his father in 1997, into his first sculpture, Fiesta Transformer. Patel's interest in movies such as Transformers led to its title, the Fiesta Transformer.

He received a Diploma Foundation Studies in Art and Design from the University of Salford in 2000 and a BA Hons Fine Art in 2003 from Nottingham Trent University.

== Work ==
Sacred Bodies (2004/5) is a collection of self-portraits. To create each piece, he covered his upper body in patterns using henna (a pigment used for mehndi) and a red pigment, Kanku, used for markings of cultural importance in Hindu communities.

In 2013, he made his debut at the TED Global conference in Edinburgh. In 2014, a UK-based dance company, Candoco, assigned Hetain Patel to create a choreographic art piece. Hetain uses minimal spoken word as parts of the performance through the usage of three languages: English, French, and British Sign Language.

Oh Man (2018) was a collaborative project between Contact Youth Company and Hetain Patel that is about the positive qualities of masculinity and the problems caused by toxic masculinity.

== Selected exhibitions ==
=== Performance ===
- Reflected Identity, Wolverhampton Art Gallery, UK, 2005
- TEN, British Council's Edinburgh Showcase in Edinburgh, UK, 2011
- Be Like Water, Royal Opera House in London, UK, 2013
- Let’s Talk About Dis, commission for dance company Condoco in London, UK and national tour, 2014
- American Boy, Coda Festival in Oslo, Norway, 2015

=== Films and video ===
- Musselm (2006)
- Kankin Raga (2007)
- Its Growing on Me (2008)
- To Dance like your Dad (2009)
- The First Dance (2012)
- Mama (2012)
- Being Chongquing (2012)
- Maestro (2014)
- Heaven & Earth (2014)
- God is a DJ (2014)
- The Jump (2015)
- The Other Suit (2015)
- Don’t look at the Finger (2017)

=== Sculpture ===
- Fiesta Transformer, C-Mine, Genk, Belgium, 2014

=== Photography ===
- Lagan, Bolten Museum and Art Gallery, UK, 2004
- At Home, Chatterjee & Lal, Mumbai, India, and New Art Exchange, Nottingham, UK, 2012 and MAC Birmingham, UK, 2013/14

=== Other exhibitions ===
- Baa's Gold, Copperfield, London, UK, 2021

== Selected awards ==
- Decibel Award awarded by Arts Council England, 2004
- Nottingham Creative Business of the Year, 2008
- Satyajit Ray Short Film Award, 2009
- Jerwood Choreographic Research Project, 2017
- Film London Jarman Award, 2019
- Best International Film awarded by Kino Der Kunst in Munich, Germany, 2020
