= Tales of the Cocktail =

Event in New Orleans, Louisiana

Tales of the Cocktails
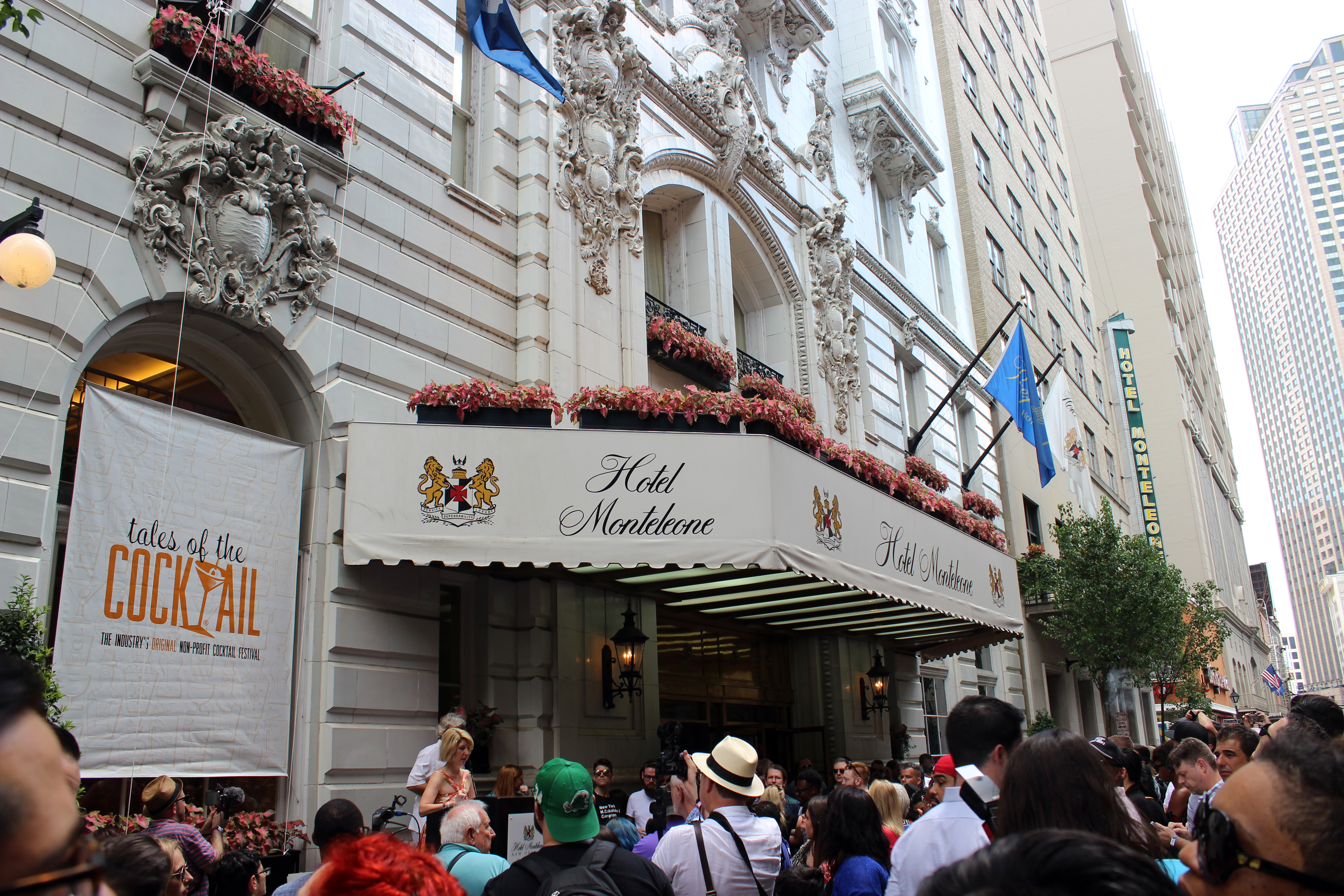
- Tales of the Cocktail attendants in front of the Hotel Monteleone.
- Status: Active
- Genre: Cocktails
- Venue: Hotel Monteleone
- Locations: New Orleans, Louisiana
- Country: United States
- Inaugurated: September 2003; 23 years ago
- Organizer: New Orleans Culinary & Cultural Preservation Society
- Website: talesofthecocktail.org//

Tales of the Cocktails (sometimes shortened to Tales or TotC) is an annual trade conference, festival, and gathering of cocktail and spirits industry professionals in New Orleans, Louisiana. The conference was founded in 2003 by cocktail enthusiast Ann Tuennerman, following an earlier walking tour started in 2002, and as of 2016 hosts between 15,000 and 17,000 ticketed attendants.

== History ==
Tales of the Cocktail began in 2002 as the New Orleans Original Cocktail Tour, a walking tour of historic New Orleans bars hosted by local cocktail aficionado Ann Tuennerman (née Rogers). In September 2003, Tuennerman celebrated the first anniversary of the tour by hosting Tales of the Cocktail, a small gathering of cocktail enthusiasts and industry professionals that included legendary bartender and writer Dale DeGroff.

After a hiatus following Hurricane Katrina in 2005, Tales of the Cocktail returned to New Orleans in 2006 and resumed operation. The event was moved up to July to avoid overlapping with the anniversary of the hurricane, and has taken place in the summer ever since.

Ann Tuennerman retired from Tales of the Cocktail on September 25, 2017. Mrs. Tuennerman informed the diversity council that her husband Paul Tuennerman would be returning to work at Tales. Several members of the council resigned in protest at not being included in the decision. Mrs. Tuennerman resigned soon thereafter.

In February, 2018 the Solomon Family and Neal Bodenheimer purchased the trademarks for Tales of the Cocktail, Ann and Paul Tuennerman completely divested from the trademarks and all business associated with Tales of the Cocktail. Additionally, there was a complete overhaul of the board of directors for the non-profit called New Orleans Culinary and Cultural Preservation Society. The Tales of the Cocktail Foundation was officially formalized under new leadership, with a mission to educate, advance, and support our industry, on February 15, 2018.

== Location ==
Tales of the Cocktail is primarily hosted at The Ritz-Carlton, New Orleans French Quarter, but many events take place at other nearby bars, hotels, and event venues.

In November 2018, Tales of the Cocktail announced a new brick and mortar location in downtown New Orleans. The venue will serve as both an event space and full service cocktail bar.

== Spirited Awards ==
In 2007, Tales of the Cocktail launched the Spirited Awards, an annual awards ceremony honoring bars, bartenders, and other industry professionals from around the world. Some of the top awards include American and International categories of Best Cocktail Bar, Bartender of the Year, Best Cocktail & Spirits Publication, World's Best Cocktail Menu, and numerous others. It is regarded by many as the most prestigious awards ceremony in the cocktail and spirits industry.

== International Events ==
In 2011, Tales of the Cocktail launched their international event Tales of the Cocktail on Tour (sometimes shortened to Tales on Tour) in Vancouver, British Columbia, Canada. The event has since taken place annually in various cities, including Buenos Aires, Argentina and Mexico City, Mexico. In 2017, Tales of the Cocktail on Tour was slated to take place in Edinburgh, Scotland.

== See also ==
- Craft cocktail movement
