= Between the sheets (cocktail) =

Alcoholic cocktail

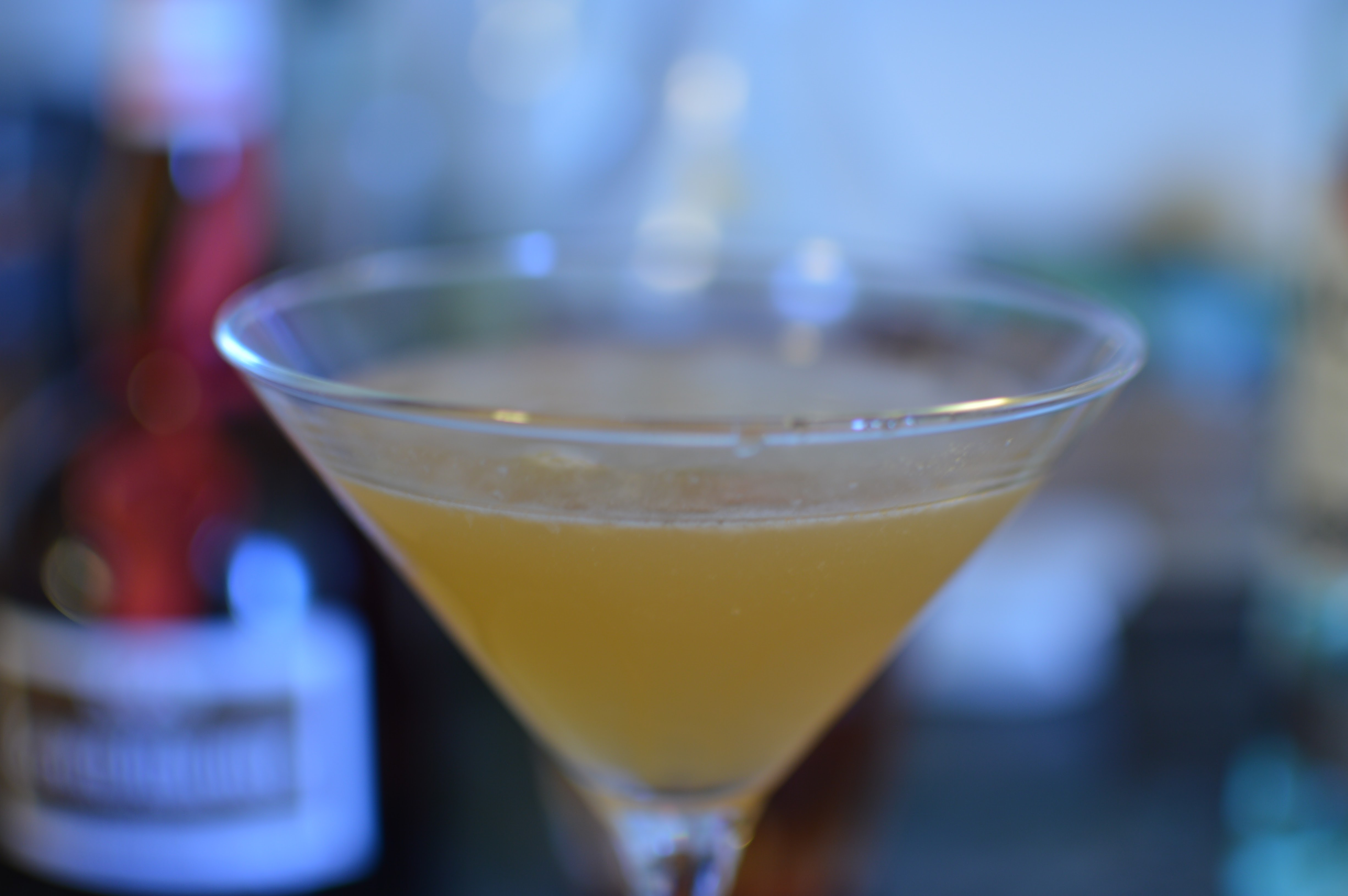
- Type: Cocktail
- Ingredients: 30 ml white rum; 30 ml cognac; 30 ml triple sec; 20 ml fresh lemon juice
- Website: iba-world.com/iba-cocktails/
- Standard drinkware: Cocktail glass
- Served: Straight up: chilled, without ice
- Preparation: Add all ingredients into a cocktail shaker. Shake with ice and strain into a chilled cocktail glass.

The between the sheets is a cocktail consisting of white rum (or other light rum), cognac, triple sec, and lemon juice. When made with gin, instead of rum and cognac, it's called a "maiden's prayer".

== History ==
The origin of the cocktail is usually credited to Harry MacElhone at Harry's New York Bar in Paris in the 1930s as a derivative of the sidecar. However, competing theories exist that claim the cocktail was created at The Berkeley in approximately 1921, or in French brothels as an apéritif for consumption by the prostitutes.

== Variations ==
The drink is similar to the sidecar, differing only by using less cognac and adding rum. The maiden's prayer is variously known as an alternate name for the between the sheets, and as a different drink using gin instead of rum and cognac, and adding orange juice to the lemon juice.

== See also ==
- List of cocktails
