= Between the Sheets =

Between the Sheets may refer to:

== Music ==
- Between the Sheets (The Isley Brothers album), 1983
  - "Between the Sheets" (song), the title song
- Between the Sheets (The 411 album), 2004
- Between the Sheets (Fourplay album), 1993
- "Between the Sheets", a song by Alexandra Burke from Heartbreak on Hold

== Other media ==
- Between the Sheets (TV series), a 2003 British miniseries
- Between the Sheets (film), a 2003 American film by Michael DeLuise
- Between the Sheets (manga), a manga by Erica Sakurazawa
- Between the Sheets (play), a 2012 Canadian one-act drama play by Jordi Mand
- Between the Sheets, a Critical Role Productions talk show hosted by Brian W. Foster

== Other uses ==
- Between the sheets (cocktail), an alcoholic drink using rum and cognac
- Between the sheets, another name for acey deucey, a card game
