= Monkey gland =

Monkey gland may refer to surgeon Serge Voronoff's 1920s technique of grafting monkey testicle tissue on to the testicles of men for purportedly therapeutic purposes. It may also refer to:

- Monkey gland (cocktail), a cocktail named for Voronoff's technique
- Monkey gland sauce, a South African restaurant item named for Voronoff's technique
