= Old pal =

Cocktail of whiskey, vermouth and Campari

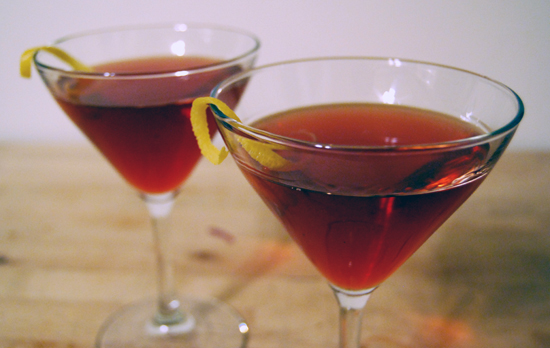
- Type: Cocktail
- Ingredients: One part rye whiskey; One part dry vermouth; One part Campari
- Base spirit: Rye whiskey
- Standard drinkware: Cocktail glass
- Standard garnish: Slice orange
- Served: Stirred
- Preparation: Fill a cocktail glass with ice cubes. Add all ingredients. Stir then strain into a cocktail glass. Garnish with orange.

The old pal is a cocktail consisting of equal parts rye whiskey, French vermouth (dry), and Campari.

== History ==
The cocktail appeared in print in MacElhone (1927), by Harry MacElhone, the proprietor of Harry's New York Bar in Paris. The cocktail appears, not in the main list of recipes, but in the essay "Cocktails About Town" by Arthur Moss, which describes cocktails by men-about-town; this essay also includes the boulevardier. The Old Pal is credited to William "Sparrow" Robinson, a sports editor for The New York Herald in Paris, while the "old pal" refers to Moss, to whom it is dedicated. The cocktail is described as:

I remember way back in 1878, on the 30th of February to be exact, when the Writer was discussing this subject with my old pal "Sparrow" Robertson and he said to yours truly, "get away with that stuff, my old pal, here's the drink I invented when I fired the pistol the first time at the old Powderhall foot races and you can't go wrong if you put a bet down on 1/3 Canadian Club, 1/3 Eyetalian [Italian] Vermouth, and 1/3 Campari," and then he told the Writer that he would dedicate this cocktail to me and call it, My Old Pal.

The reference to 1878 is clearly a joke, the name is given as My Old Pal, and the recipe featured Italian vermouth (sweet), rather than the now-standard French vermouth (dry), as well as Canadian Club specifically, rather than Canadian whisky (or rye whiskey) generally.

French vermouth appears in Boothby (1934), where the recipe is given as (no specification on the whiskey):

Old Pal

Whisky 1/3 jigger, Fr. [French] Vermouth 1/3 jigger, Campari 1/3 jigger
Shake well with ice, strain into chilled cocktail glass and serve.

The cocktail appeared in later editions of Harry's ABC of Mixing Cocktails, such as the "New" edition (1952), where it is given with the modern recipe, as:

226. "Old Pal" Cocktail.

1/3 Canadian Whisky, 1/3 French Vermouth, 1/3 Campari.
(Recipe by "Sparrow" Robertson, Sporting Editor of the New York Herald, Paris.)

The cocktail was popular enough to be included as one of the 50 cocktail in the inaugural 1961 list of IBA official cocktails, but was removed in the 1987 revision.

== Similar drinks ==
This old pal is very similar to the boulevardier, which first appeared in the same essay by Arthur Moss in MacElhone (1927), but features Canadian (rye) whisky instead of bourbon, and now features dry (French) vermouth instead of sweet (Italian) vermouth, though originally both drinks featured Italian vermouth. Further, while both drinks were originally equal parts, and the IBA recipe for the old pal still is equal parts (1:1:1), the boulevardier often has more whiskey: 1½:1:1 (3:2:2) in the IBA recipe, and 2:1:1 is also common.

It is similar to a Negroni, but with rye whiskey instead of gin and dry vermouth instead of sweet.
