= Rose (cocktail) =

Cocktail of vermouth, Kirsch and fruit syrup

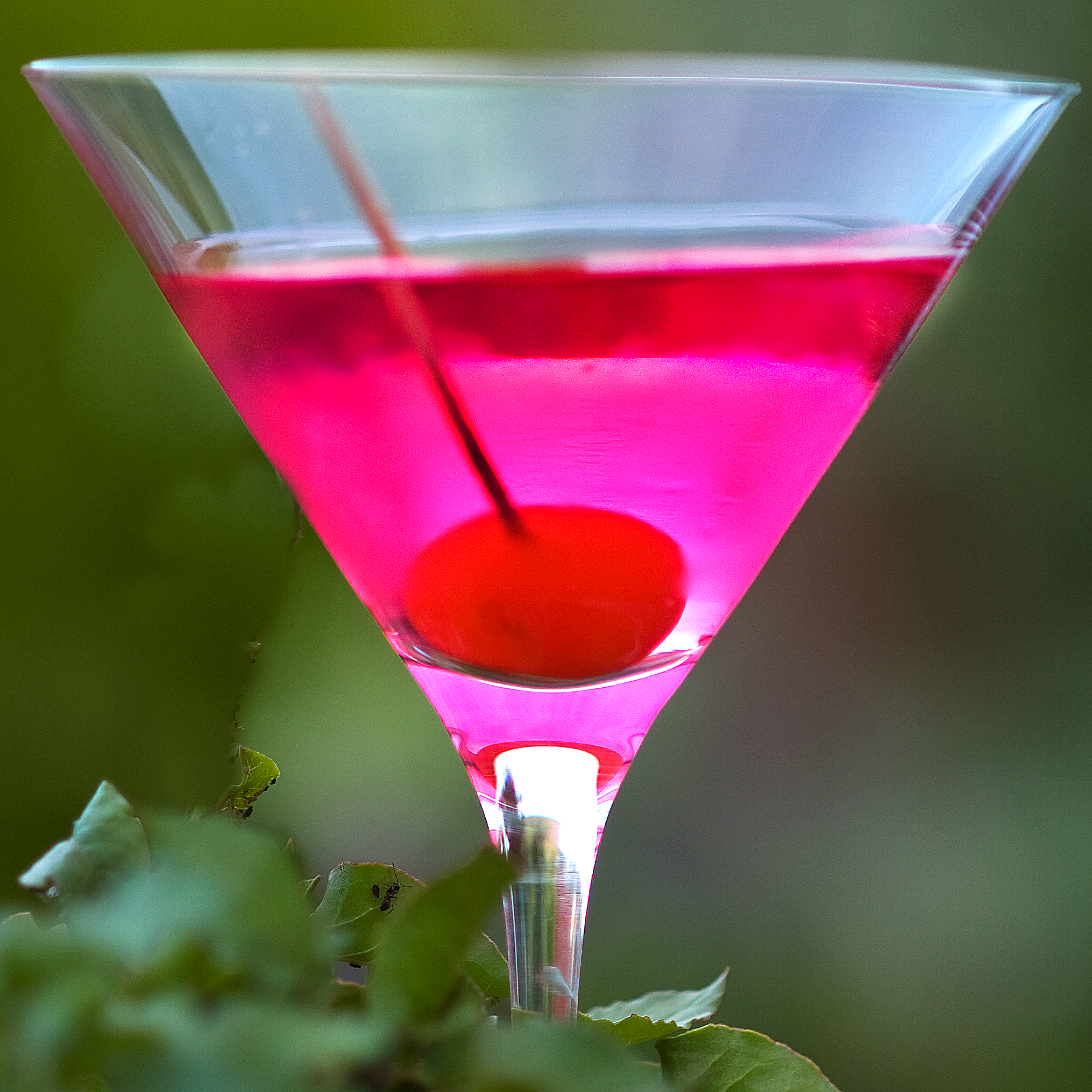
- Type: Wine cocktail
- Ingredients: 4 cl (2 parts) dry vermouth; 2 cl (1 parts) Kirsch; 3 Dashes Strawberry syrup
- Base spirit: Vermouth
- Standard drinkware: Cocktail glass
- Standard garnish: Maraschino cherry
- Served: Straight up: chilled, without ice
- Preparation: Shake together in a cocktail shaker, then strain into chilled glass. Garnish and serve.

Rose is a cocktail made of vermouth, Kirschwasser (cherry eau de vie) and fruit syrup (strawberry, raspberry or redcurrant). Some recipes include cherry liqueur and gin.

The Rose cocktail was popular in 1920s Paris and was created by Johnny Mitta, barman at the Chatham Hotel. A recipe for it can be found in a 1927 book by Harry MacElhone, owner of Harry's New York Bar in Paris.
