= White Lady (cocktail) =

Alcoholic beverage

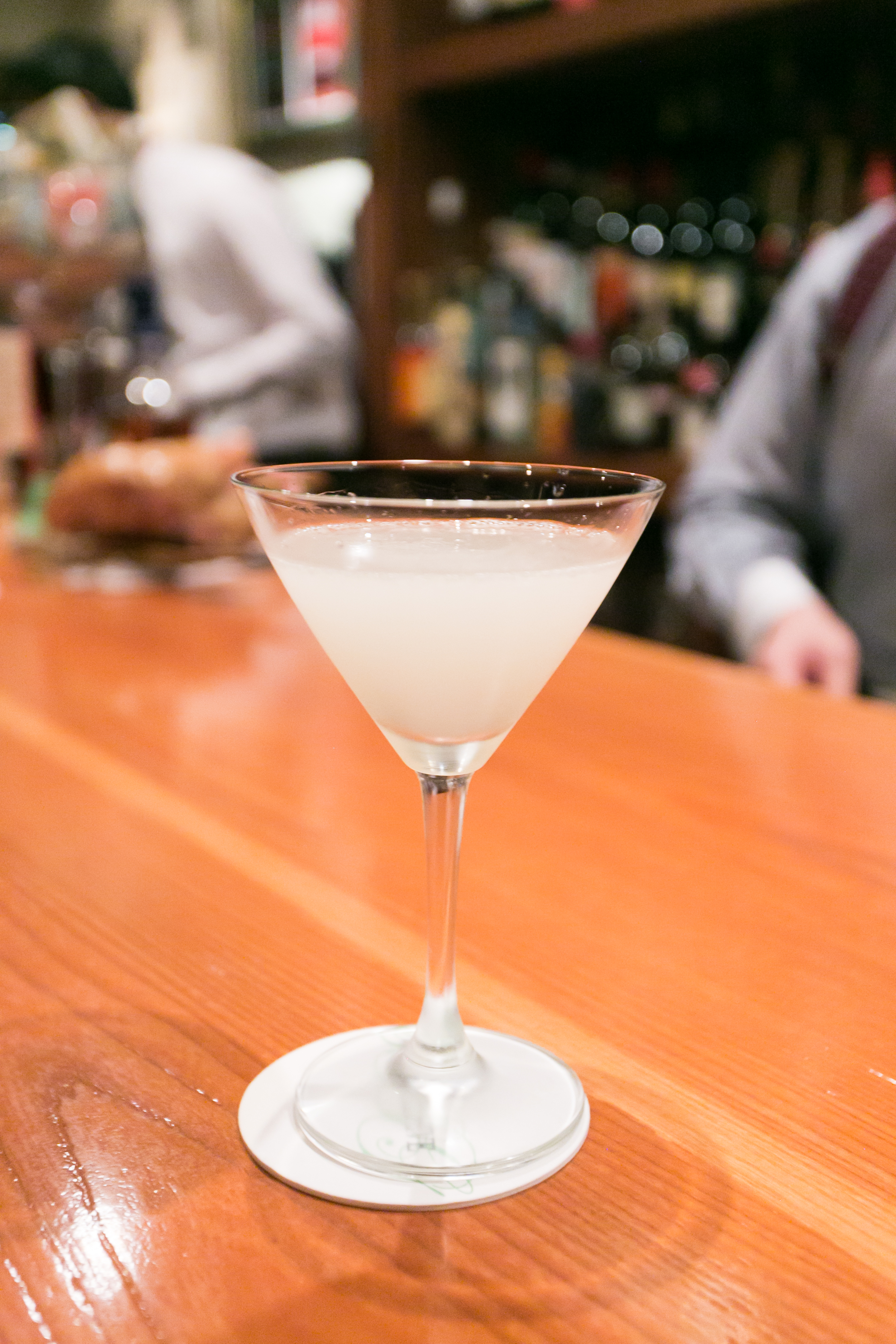
- Type: Cocktail
- Ingredients: 40 ml gin; 30 ml triple sec; 20 ml lemon juice
- Base spirit: Gin
- Standard drinkware: Cocktail glass
- Served: Straight up: chilled, without ice
- Preparation: Add all ingredients into cocktail shaker filled with ice. Shake well and strain into large cocktail glass.

The White Lady (also known as a Delilah, or Chelsea sidecar) is a classic cocktail that is made with gin, Cointreau or triple sec, fresh lemon juice and an optional egg white. It belongs to the sidecar family, made with gin in place of brandy. The cocktail sometimes also includes additional ingredients, for example egg white, sugar, cream, or creme de menthe.

The White Lady is most commonly served in a martini cocktail glass. When an egg white is added, one should prefer a champagne coupe; the silky foam clings more pleasingly to the curved glass.

== Origin ==
The original recipe for the White Lady was devised by Harry MacElhone in 1919 at Ciro's Club in London. He originally used crème de menthe (specifically, Giffard's Menthe Pastille), but replaced it with gin at Harry's New York Bar in Paris in 1929.

According to the American Bar at the Savoy Hotel, the drink was created there by Harry Craddock.

== History ==
A recipe for the White Lady made with gin, Cointreau, and fresh lemon juice appears in the Savoy Cocktail Book, published in 1930. Joe Gilmore, former Head Barman at The Savoy, says this was one of Laurel and Hardy's favorite drinks.

Early recipes such as MacElhone's and Craddock's do not have egg white as one of the recorded ingredients.

== Comparison with the gin sour ==
While sours are characterized by a bright acidity, sidecars are often drier, since they are made with liqueurs (in this case Cointreau) instead of sugar. Sidecars are considered more of a challenge for bartenders because the proportion of ingredients is more difficult to balance for liqueurs of variable sweetness.

== In popular culture ==
In John le Carré's 1965 novel The Looking Glass War, protagonist Fred Leiser's favourite drink is a White Lady; he makes several attempts to get other agents to try the cocktail.

It is mentioned in the novel Islands in the Stream by Ernest Hemingway.

It is also mentioned in the films Inspector Hornleigh (1938) and Isle of Missing Men (1942). In The Intelligence Men (1965), Eric Morecambe orders a White Lady from hotel room service, after the arrival of a lady dressed in white; Ernie Wise delivers the drink, posing as a member of staff.

A mock version of the drink is made in the Japanese manga series Kaguya-sama: Love Is War.

In Molly Keane's 1981 novel Good Behaviour, Aroon St. Charles drinks White Ladies with her brother Hubert and their friend Richard Massingham.

The White Lady is a favorite summer drink for lead character Phryne Fisher in multiple novels by Kerry Greenwood in her series "Phryne Fisher Mysteries," which are set in late 1920's Australia. A recipe is included in Book 16: "Murder in the Dark."

In Agatha Christie's novel "By the Pricking of My Thumbs," a White Lady drink is offered to Tuppence Beresford by her husband Tommy, in Chapter 3: A Funeral.
