= Negroni (surname) =

Negroni is an Italian/Corsican surname. Notable people with the surname include:

- Andrea Negroni (1710–1789), Italian Cardinal
- Baldassarre Negroni (1877–1948), Italian film director and screenwriter
- Christine Negroni (born 1956), American aviation and travel writer
- Daniele Negroni (born 1995), Italian singer and runner-up on Deutschland sucht den Superstar (season 9)
- Giovanni Francesco Negroni (1629–1713), Italian Cardinal
- Héctor Andrés Negroni (born 1938), American Air Force officer, historian and aerospace senior executive
- Jean Négroni (1920–2005) French actor
- Joe Negroni (1940–1978), American singer of Puerto Rican descent
- Luca Negroni (born 1964), Italian ski mountaineer
- María Negroni (born 1951), Argentinian poet, essayist, novelist and translator
- General Pascal Olivier Count de Negroni (1829–1913), led the charge of Cuirassiers in the Battle of Reichshoffen during the Franco-Prussian War of 1870
- Pietro Negroni (c. 1505–1565), Italian painter of the Renaissance period

== Other ==
- Negroni, cocktail credited to various people by this name

== See also ==
- Neroni, also an Italian surname
