= Negroni =

Cocktail made of gin, vermouth, and Campari

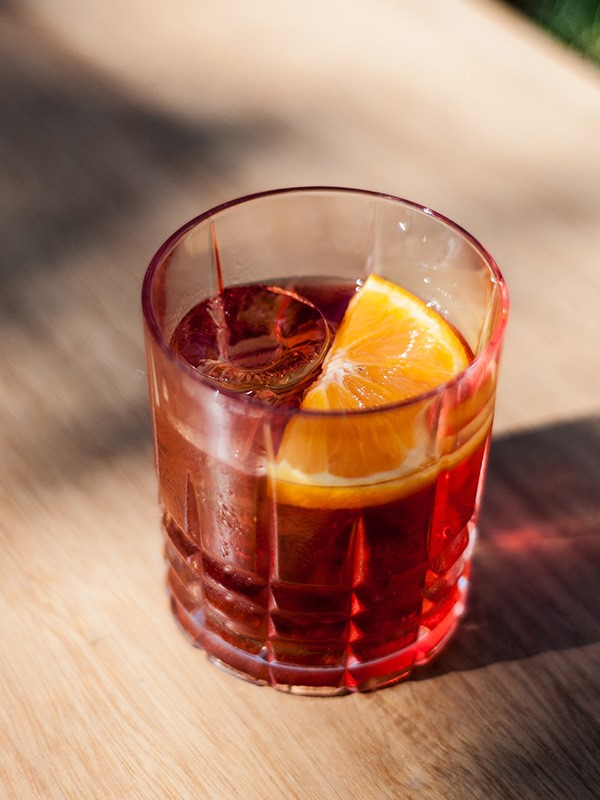
- A negroni
- Type: Cocktail
- Ingredients: 30 mL gin; 30 mL sweet red vermouth; 30 mL Campari
- Base spirit: Gin, vermouth, Campari
- Standard drinkware: Old fashioned glass
- Standard garnish: Orange slice
- Served: On the rocks: poured over ice
- Preparation: Build in glass over ice, garnish and serve.

A Negroni is an Italian cocktail, made of equal parts gin, vermouth rosso (red, semi-sweet), and Campari, generally served with ice, and commonly garnished with an orange slice or orange peel. It is considered an apéritif.

The drink has been documented in Italy since the late 1940s, and became popular in the 1950s, but the origin is uncertain, and early recipes differ somewhat from the modern standard; see § History for details. Early recipes were either these three ingredients served straight up (in a cocktail glass or coupe, no ice), or were served long (over ice with soda). The modern recipe of equal parts served short (over ice, without soda) is not recorded until the 1950s or 1960s.

The basic recipe – an equal-parts cocktail of these three ingredients – is first recorded in French cocktail books of the late 1920s, alongside many similar drinks; in Italy a long drink of equal parts vermouth and Campari (but no gin), topped with soda and served over ice, has existed since the 1800s under the names Milano–Torino or Americano. There are claims of Italian drinks by the name "Negroni" containing gin from 1919, most commonly that it was invented in Florence by bartender Fosco Scarselli, for his customer Count Camillo Negroni, though this drink differed significantly from the modern drink; see § Name for details.

== Technique ==
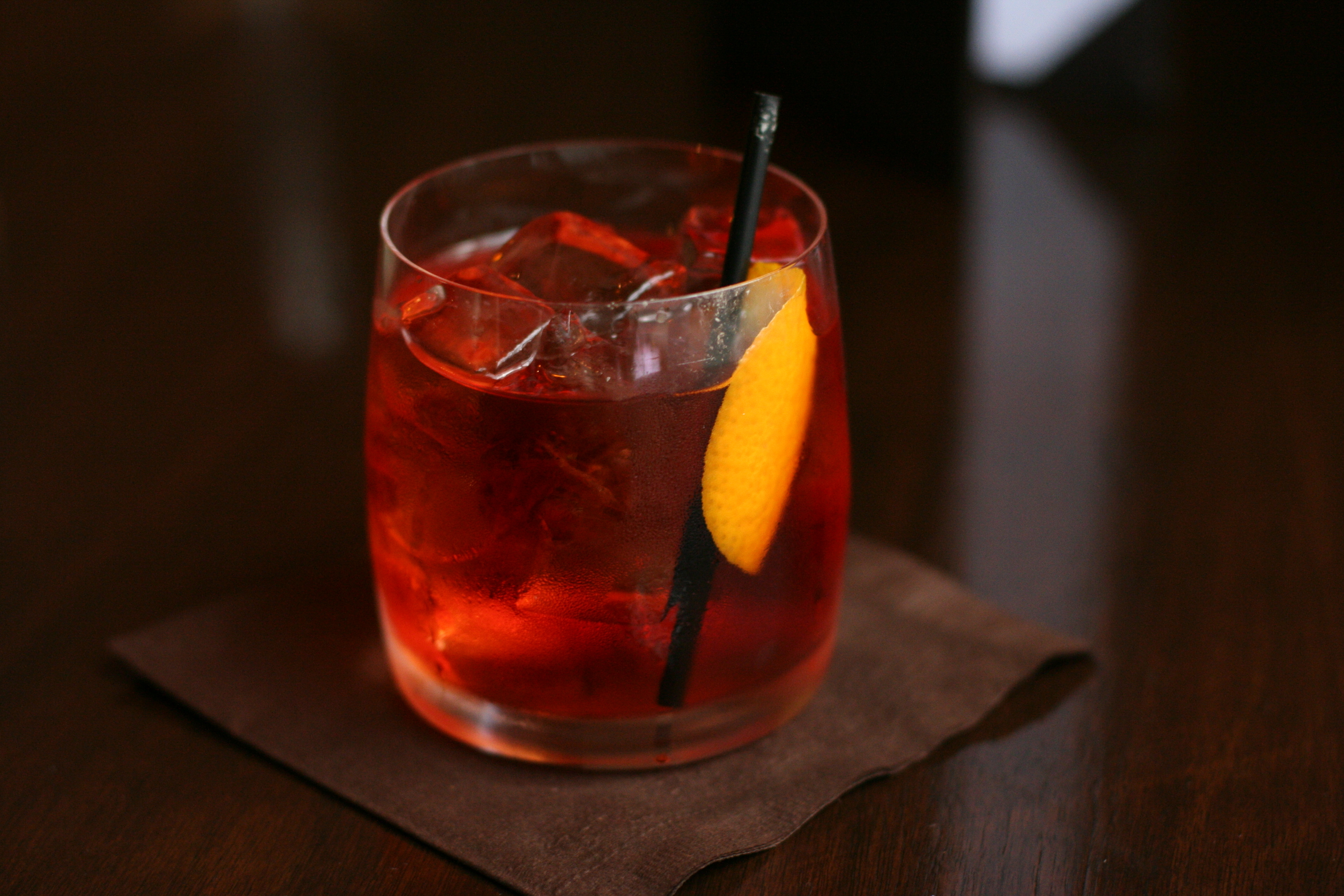
Negronis are often garnished with an orange peel.

The International Bartenders Association recipe for the negroni specifies that it be built over ice in an old-fashioned or rocks glass and garnished with a slice of orange, similar to an old fashioned or spritz (short, minus the soda).

Common variations include using an orange peel (or lemon peel) in place of an orange slice (especially outside Italy), stirring then pouring over ice, and sometimes stirring and serving straight up.

== History ==
The drink's origins are not known with certainty, but the documentary evidence is consistent with it originating as a short, American-style cocktail in 1920s France, like its well-documented contemporary, the old pal (and similar cocktails such as the boulevardier), and was most popular in the 1930s and early 1940s as a 2:1:1 drink, served up, called the Campariete. In the late 1940s the short drink then acquired the name Negroni from a separate, similar long Italian-style drink of vermouth and soda, with small amounts of Campari and gin, served over ice; or from a variant of the Milano–Torino or Americano, equal parts vermouth and Campari, with a small amount of gin, plus soda, served over ice. By the mid-1950s the preferred name was "Negroni" and the preferred ratio was 1:1:1, served over ice but without soda.

Combinations of gin, vermouth, and Campari are found in various French cocktail books from 1927 to 1930. The name "Negroni" first appears in print for a cocktail in Gandiglio (1947), for a drink close to the modern one.

=== Recipe ===
The earliest known attestation of a drink with the same ingredients and proportions (1:1:1) as the modern recipe is from the French cocktail book Alimbau & Milhorat (1929), where it is referred to as "Campari Mixte", and the recipe is given as:

Dans un shaker, avec de la glace en morceaux, un tiers de Campari, un tiers de Gin, un tiers de Vermouth italien, bien mélanger et servir avec un zeste de citron.

In a shaker, with pieces of ice, a third of Campari, a third of gin, a third of Italian vermouth, mix well and serve with a lemon zest.

This differs from the modern IBA recipe in a few respects: it is shaken, not built, and it is garnished with a lemon twist, not an orange slice. These variations make it closer to a standard American-style cocktail than an Italian-style drink.

Various combinations of gin, vermouth, and bitters are found earlier in Lupoiu (1927) and Requien & Farnoux-Reynaud (1927).

A similar recipe of 2:1:1 gin, vermouth, and Campari is attested from the Parisian book Thenon (1929) as the "Camparinete", where it is credited to Albert of the [Hôtel] Chatam (Chatham hotel), and specifies Cora brand vermouth and a lemon zest. The same book credits Albert of the Chatham bar with the Rose, though that is attested years earlier by another bartender at the same bar, so it is not clear if Albert originated this variant of the drink, or simply represented the bar in this collection.

This drink is listed in numerous American, French, and Spanish cocktail books of the 1930s and 1940s, including Boothby (1934, p. 39) (shaken, twist lemon peel over), Brucart (1943), and Trader Vic's Bartender's Guide (1947). Brucart (1943, p. 29) credits the drink to Albert of Chatam, Paris, and specifies that it be shaken, and served up (in a coupe). In Brucart (1949), this 1:1:2 cocktail is referred to as “Negroni-Cocktail”, and is given as:

Negroni-Cocktail
1/4 de vermut italiano, 2/4 de Campari, 1/4 de Gin.

1/4 Italian vermouth, 2/4 Campari, 1/4 gin.

Notably, Brucart refers to the same recipe as "Campariete" in 1943 and "Negroni" in 1949, attaching a new name to an existing drink.

There is a "Negrone" cocktail in Anonymous (1939), but the 1939 date is not believable, and it likely dates to the early 1950s, per cocktail historian David Wondrich.

There is no known recipe for a "Negroni" or an equal-parts drink of gin, vermouth, and Campari in Italian cocktail books before the 1940s. For example, the encyclopedic Grassi (1936) contains 1,000 recipes, including several with Campari (two versions of the Milano–Torino and a dozen versions of the Americano), but no negroni or gin/vermouth/Campari drink.

The earliest known recipe for a "Negroni" in an Italian text is in Gandiglio (1947), where it is given as:

Nel bicchiere de acqua: un pezzo di ghiacco - 1/3 Bitter Campari - 1/3 Vermouth Grassotti rosso - 1/3 Gin - 1 buccia d'arancia; servite con del selz.

In a water glass: one piece of ice - 1/3 Campari Bitters - 1/3 red Grassotti Vermouth - 1/3 Gin - 1 orange peel; serve with seltzer.

This differs from the modern recipe in being a long drink, served with seltzer, rather than a short drink; and being garnished with an orange peel, rather than an orange slice. It is similar to the modern drink (and differs from the earlier French recipes) in being built and served with ice, rather than being shaken or stirred and served up.

The same text includes a variant, "Asmara o Negroni" (Asmara or Negroni), referencing the city of Asmara, the (by then former) capital of Italian Eritrea, with recipe closer to a martini, just with Campari as the bitter (and orange twist instead of lemon twist):

Nel mixing-glass: qualche goccia di Bitter Campari - 2/3 Gordon Gin - 1/3 Vermouth Grassotti bianco - buccia d'arancia; scuotete bene e servite nel Cocktail-glass n. 8.

In a mixing glass: a few drops of Campari Bitter - 2/3 Gordon Gin - 1/3 white Grassotti Vermouth - orange peel; shake well and serve in a n. 8 [number 8] cocktail glass.

An equal-parts cocktail called "Negroni" is attested in the British text UKBG (1953), where the recipe is given as:

Negroni

1/3 Dry Gin.
1/3 Sweet Vermouth.
1/3 Campari Bitters.
Stir and Strain.
Add Twist of Lemon Peel.

This is almost identical to the "Campari Mixte" (1929), except that it is stirred, not shaken. It still differs from the modern negroni in being stirred, not built; implicitly served up, not on the rocks; and garnished with a lemon twist, not an orange slice.

=== In popular culture ===
The earliest reports in English are from traveler writers to Italy and the Mediterranean, and describe a long drink based on vermouth and soda, with the addition of small amounts of Campari, gin, and sometimes Angostura bitters, similar to a vermouth-based spritz.

One of the earliest reports of a drink by the name "Negroni" came from Orson Welles in correspondence with the Coshocton Tribune while working in Rome on Cagliostro in 1947, where he described a new drink called the Negroni, "The bitters are excellent for your liver, the gin is bad for you. They balance each other."

Later, more detailed descriptions are given in Horace Sutton, Footloose in Italy (1950), and Rupert Croft-Cooke, Tangerine House (1956, p. 108), which gives the description:

You shake a dash of Angostura over a lump of ice in a large glass, add about a teaspoonful of Campari bitters, a wineglass-full of vermouth, a little gin, a shaving of lemon peel, then fill up with soda water.

=== Name ===
The name "Negroni" is an Italian surname, and numerous people claim to have invented the cocktail or to have had it named after them, though these lack contemporary sources.

The most widely reported account is that it was first mixed in Florence, Italy, in 1919, at Caffè Casoni (now Caffè Giacosa), on Via de' Tornabuoni, by bartender Fosco Scarselli, for his customer Count Camillo Negroni; see Picchi (2002). The commonly held origin story is that it was concocted by a member of the Negroni family asking the bartender to strengthen the Americano by adding gin, rather than the normal soda water. The bartender also added an orange garnish rather than the typical lemon garnish of the Americano to signify that it was a different drink. Cocktail historian David Wondrich researched Camillo Negroni, whose status as a count is questionable, but whose grandfather, Luigi Negroni, was indeed a count. The year 1919 may be a confusion with the amaro today sold as Old 1919 (Antico Negroni 1919); see below.

The descendants of Pascal Olivier de Negroni, Count de Negroni have claimed that he invented the drink in 1857 in Senegal; this has been circulated by his descendants, however, Campari did not exist until 1860. A Corse-Matin Sunday Edition article from 1980 says he invented the drink around 1914; which is again impossible, as he died in 1913.

An unrelated person, Cavaliere (Knight) Guglielmo Negroni, founded Negroni Distillerie in Treviso, Italy in 1919, and produced a red amaro, now sold as Old 1919 (Antico Negroni 1919). There is no evidence that this is related to the modern Campari-based cocktail, though the prominent "1919" may be why that year is given as the origin of the classic cocktail.

=== Precursors ===
Andrew Willett believes that this drink originated in San Francisco, where Campari was first imported to the United States, between 1904 (when Campari began to be mass produced) and 1920 (when Prohibition started) as a modification of the martini, replacing orange bitters with Campari. Like the martini, this drink consists of Italian ingredients (vermouth, Campari) mixed with gin in an American-style cocktail. He finds an Italian origin implausible, as at the time the spirits-based cocktails popular in the United States were not made in Italy; they were considered American style, as seen in the American Bar (London, 1893), Harry's New York Bar (Paris, 1911), and Harry's Bar (Venice, 1931).

== Variations ==
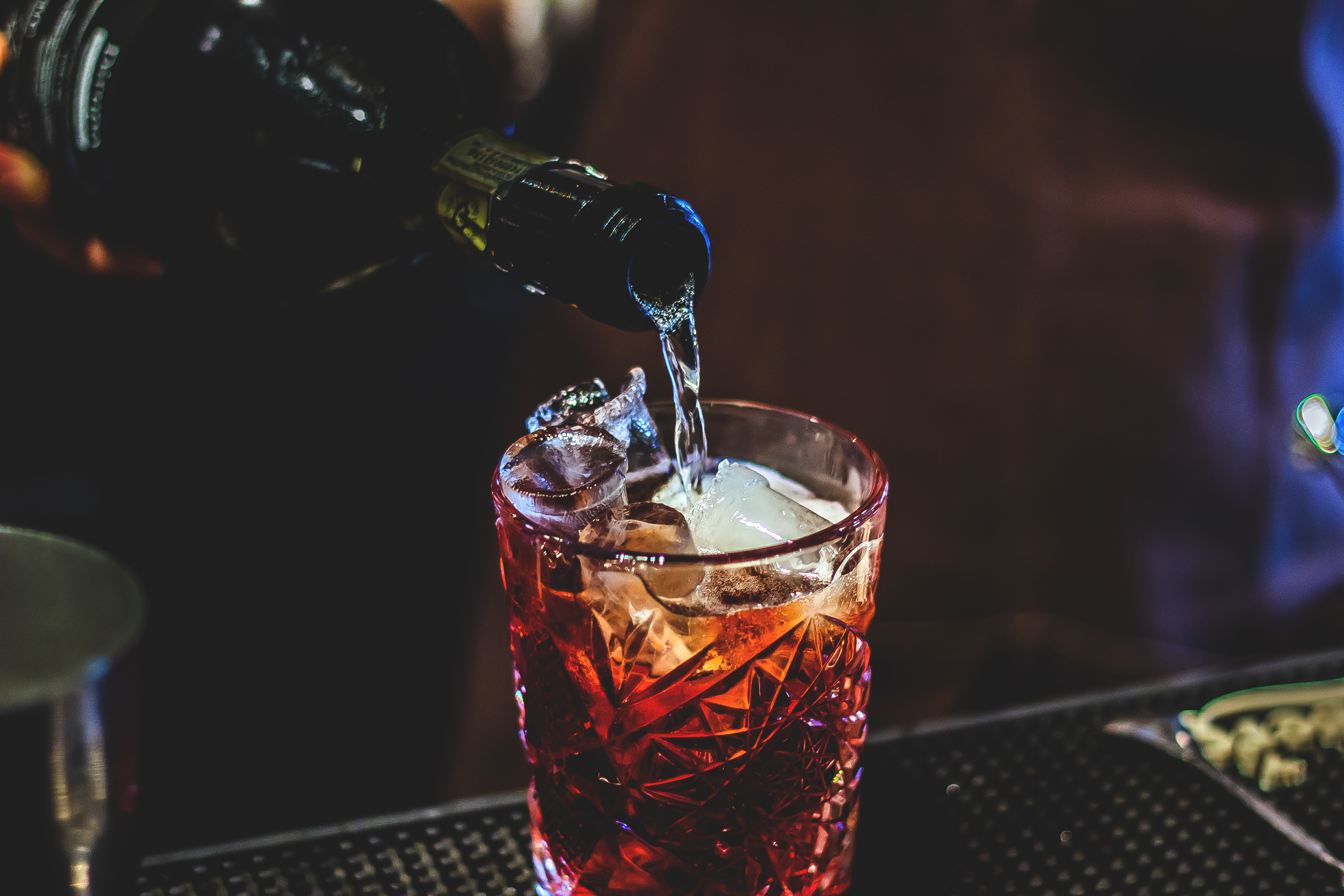
Negroni sbagliato

- Aperol Negroni: Uses Aperol in place of the Campari
- Dutch Negroni: uses Jenever for the London dry gin
- Negroni sbagliato (Italian: [neˈɡroːni zbaʎˈʎaːto]; "mistaken negroni"): uses sparkling white wine or Prosecco (spumante) in place of gin
- Negroscan: a New Hampshire drink that uses traditional Scandinavian akvavit instead of gin
- Agavoni or Tegroni: uses tequila in place of gin.
- White Negroni: gin, Lillet blanc, and Suze
- Unusual Negroni: gin, Aperol and Lillet blanc
- A Negroni served with a dash of freshly squeezed orange juice was named a Negroni malato ("sick Negroni") at Bar Piccolino in Exchange Square, London during the 2008 financial crisis, by Italian bankers employed at nearby RBS offices.
- Pisco Negroni: uses pisco in place of gin.
- National Negroni: uses Chilean herbal liqueur araucano in place of gin.
- Negroski: uses vodka in place of gin
- Cardinale: uses Dry vermouth in place of Sweet Vermouth.

== Similar cocktails ==
- Boulevardier – bourbon whiskey instead of gin, 3:2:2 instead of equal parts (1:1:1), served straight up with an orange twist
- Old pal – rye whiskey instead of gin, dry vermouth instead of (sweet) vermouth rosso, served straight up with an orange twist

== See also ==
- List of cocktails
