= French 75 (cocktail) =

Cocktail made from gin (or cognac), Champagne, lemon juice, and sugar

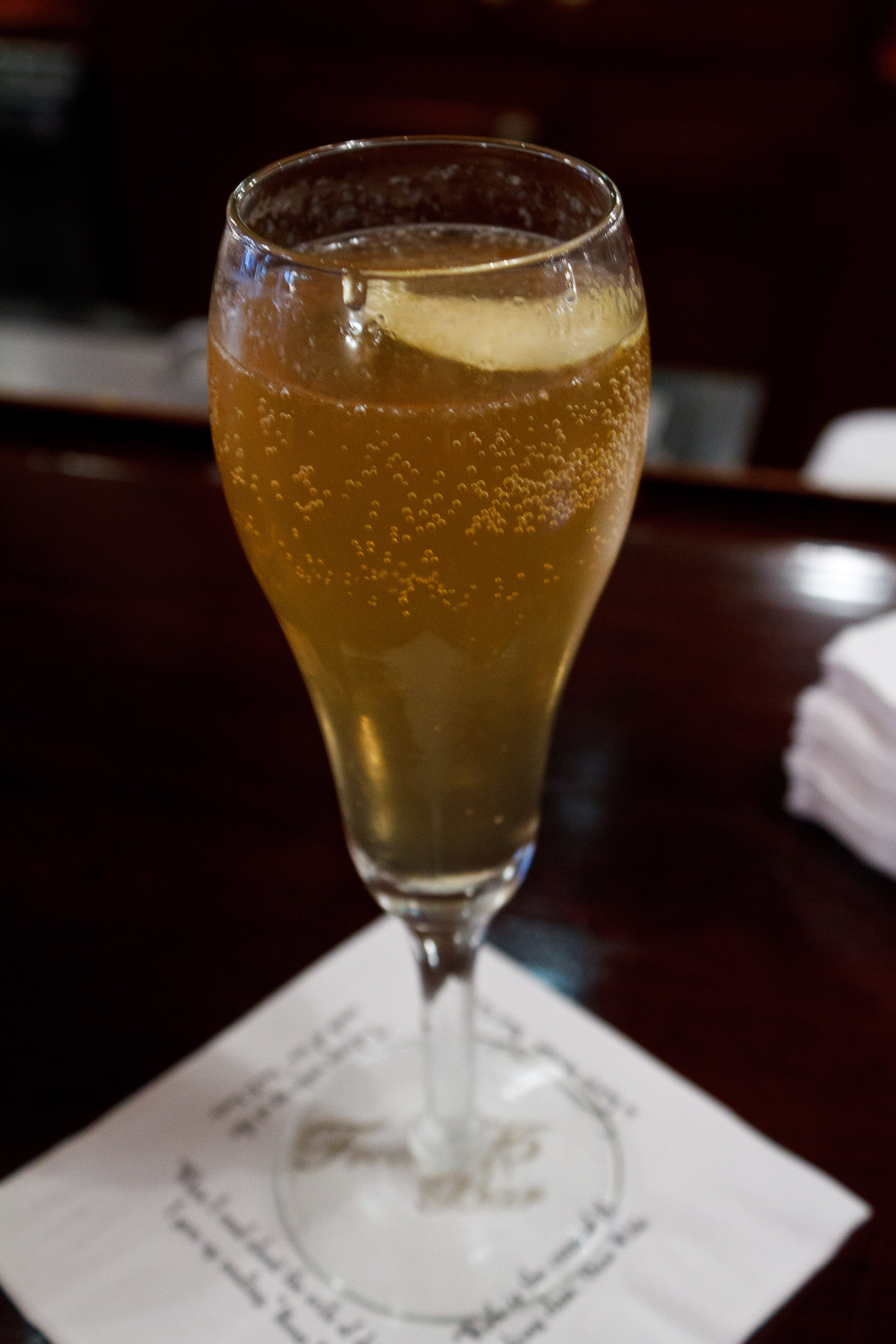
- Type: Wine cocktail
- Ingredients: 30 mL (1 US fl oz) gin; 15 mL (0.5 US fl oz) lemon juice; 15 mL (0.5 US fl oz) simple syrup; 60 mL (2 US fl oz) Champagne
- Base spirit: gin or cognac
- Standard drinkware: Champagne flute
- Served: Straight up: chilled, without ice
- Preparation: Pour all the ingredients, except Champagne, into a shaker. Shake well and strain into a Champagne flute. Top up with Champagne. Stir gently.

French 75 is a cocktail made from gin (or cognac), champagne, lemon juice, and sugar. It is also called a 75 cocktail, or in French simply a soixante quinze ('seventy five').

The drink was popular during World War I in a brandy-based form. Barman Harry MacElhone said it was named after the Canon de 75 modèle 1897, a French light field gun of 75 mm (3 in) calibre.

== History ==
The drink with its current name and recipe developed over the 1920s, though similar drinks date to the 19th century. In the 19th century, the champagne cup, was a popular cocktail, consisting of champagne, lemon juice, sugar, and ice. Gin was sometimes added, yielding a drink much like the French 75.

The drink was first recorded as the "75" in Harry's ABC of Mixing Cocktails, 1922 edition, by Harry MacElhone, and in the same year in Robert Vermeire's Cocktails: How to Mix Them, which credits the drink to MacElhone. However, the recipes differed from the current form – MacElhone's version consisted of calvados, gin, grenadine, and absinthe, while Vermeire added lemon juice. A fanciful story, made decades later by humorist Jean Shepherd, credits invention of the cocktail to World War I flying ace, Raoul Lufbery, though the contemporary sources of MacElhone and Vermeire do not support this claim.

The recipe took its now-classic form and "French 75" name in Here’s How, by Judge Jr. (1927), consisting of gin, sugar, lemon juice, and champagne. This recipe was republished with the name "French 75" in The Savoy Cocktail Book (1930), which helped popularize the drink. Some later cocktail books use cognac instead of gin, such as The Fine Art of Mixing Drinks by David A. Embury.

The French 75 was popularized in America at the Stork Club in New York. It appears in the movie Casablanca (1942) and is referenced twice in the John Wayne films A Man Betrayed (1941) and Jet Pilot (1957). In 2016, it appears in the ITV series Mr. Selfridge, which is set in London in the 1910s and 1920s.

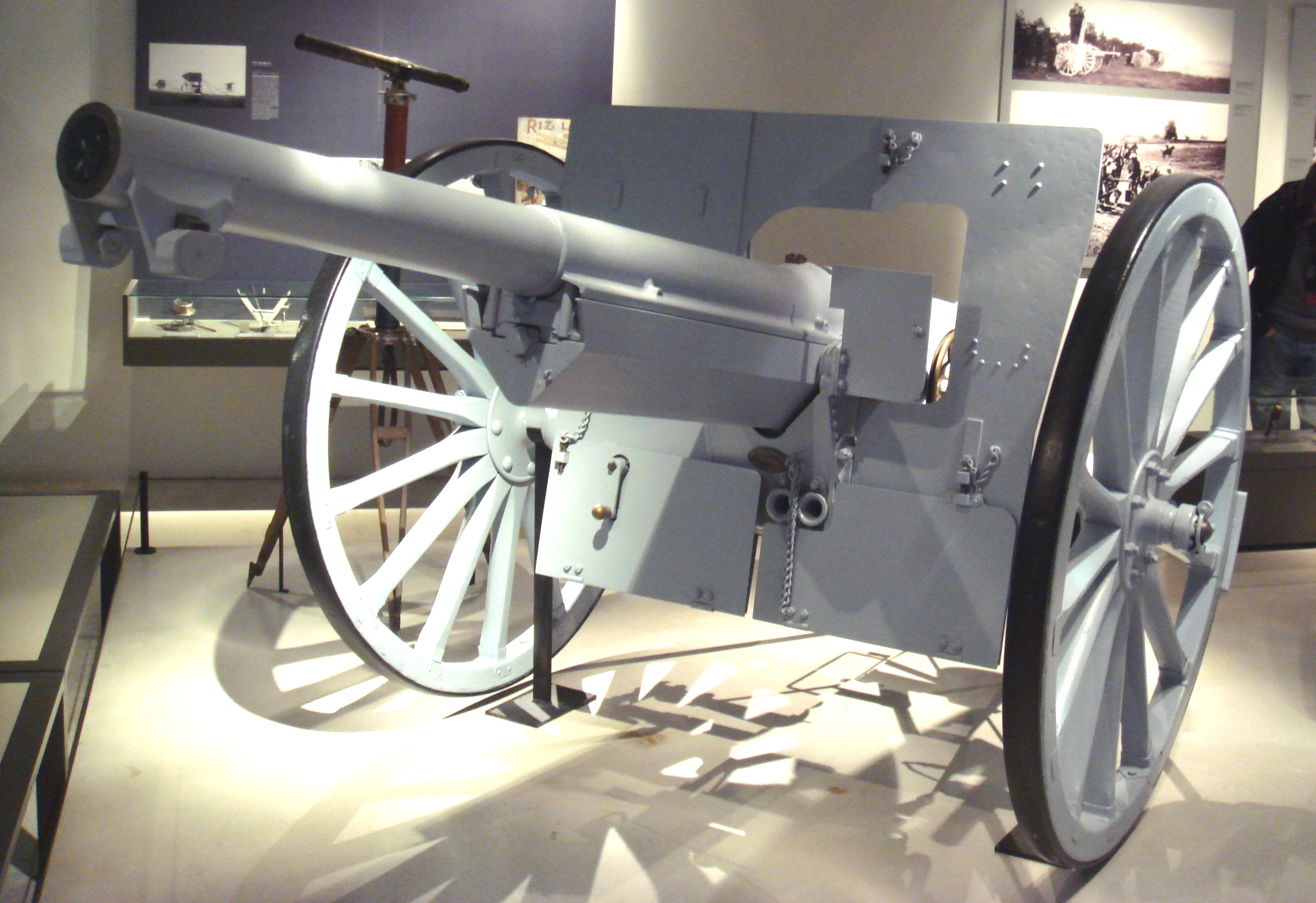
The Canon de 75 modèle 1897 is the source of the name of the cocktail.

== Similar drinks ==
The recipe of the French 75 is very similar to one of the most popular cocktails, the Tom Collins, with champagne replacing carbonated water. According to the recipe in Harry MacElhone's book Harry's ABC of Mixing Cocktails, a French 75 is supposed to be served in a highball glass. The highball glass, which the Tom Collins cocktail is also served in, supports the theory of the French 75 being a variation of the Tom Collins.

A "French 125" replaces the gin with cognac. A "French 95" replaces the gin with bourbon.

== In culture ==
- In "Cold Fusion," a 2020 episode of the animated spy comedy Archer, Malory Archer drinks a French 75.
- In Paul Thomas Anderson's black comedy One Battle After Another, the name "French 75" refers to a left-wing revolutionary group that plays a central role in the plot.
