= Neroni =

Neroni is an Italian-language surname. Notable people with the surname include:

- Bartolomeo Neroni (c.1505–1571), Italian painter, sculptor, architect, and engineer
- Diotisalvi Neroni (1401–1482), Italian politician
- Signora Madeline Vesey Neroni, novel character of Barchester Towers (1857)

== See also ==
- Negroni (surname)
- Negroni, a cocktail named after Pascal Olivier Count de Negroni
- Tuiloma Neroni Slade (born 1941), Samoan diplomat
