= Monkey nut =

Monkey nut may refer to:

== Plants ==
- Anacardium humile, a plant species known for its medicinal and insecticidal properties
- Hicksbeachia pinnatifolia, a small tree also known as beef nut, ivory silky oak, monkey nut, red bopple nut, red nut, and rose nut
- Peanut, a legume crop also known as a goober, groundnut, or monkey nut
- Sterculia quadrifida, a small tree also known as the peanut tree or red-fruited kurrajong

== See also ==
- Monkey gland (disambiguation)
