= Jennings Cox =

American mining engineer said to have invented the daiquiri

Jennings Stockton Cox Jr.
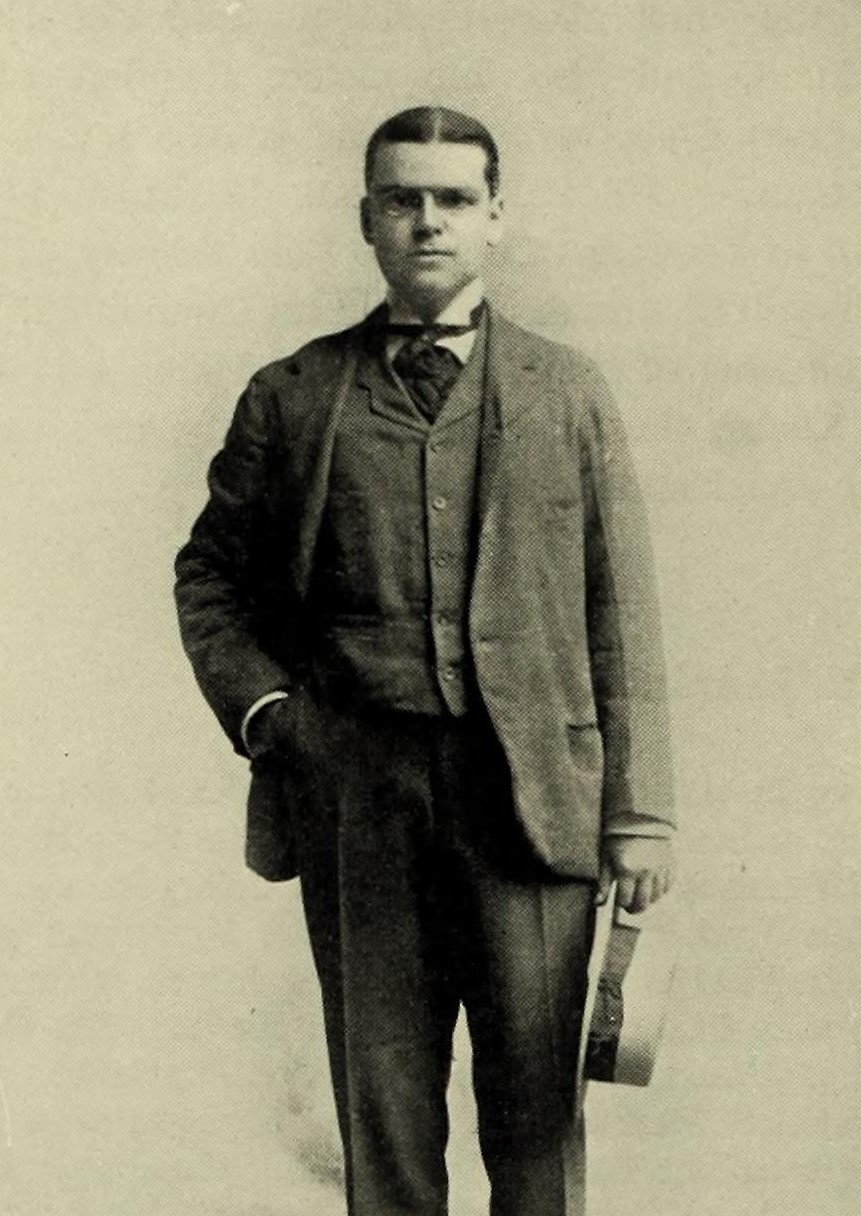
- Born: November 23, 1866; Baltimore, Maryland
- Died: August 31, 1913 (aged 46); New York City, New York
- Education: Columbia University
- Occupation: Mining engineer
- Known for: Inventing the daiquiri

Jennings Stockton Cox Jr. (November 23, 1866 – August 31, 1913) was an American mining engineer who is said to have invented the drink known as the daiquiri in the late nineteenth century while working as an expatriate engineer in Cuba.

== Biography ==
Cox was born in Baltimore, Maryland on November 23, 1866. He was a descendant of James Cox, an early settler of Maryland and speaker of the House of Burgess of Maryland. His grandfather was John Nelson McJilton, Baltimore's first Superintendent of Baltimore City Public Schools who was ousted for opening black schools. His father was a stockbroker who served as the president of New York Athletic Club and was a member of the New York Stock Exchange.

Cox attended San Francisco High School and Columbia School of Mines, graduating in 1887 as the school's first class of metallurgic engineers. After graduation, he was employed by the Government Survey of the Harlem Ship Canal, and became associated with the Pennsylvania Steel Company and Carnegie Steel Company. From 1897 until his death, he was the general manager of the Spanish-American Iron Company, situated near the village of Daiquirí, about 14 miles east south-east of Santiago de Cuba.

=== Invention of the Daiquiri ===
It is said that the drink was invented when Cox ran out of gin while entertaining American guests. Wary about serving local rum straight up, Cox added lime juice and sugar to improve the rum’s taste. Consumption of the drink remained localized until 1909, when Admiral Lucius W. Johnson Sr, a US Navy medical officer, tried Cox’s drink. Johnson subsequently introduced it to the Army and Navy Club in Washington, D.C., and to ports of call around the world. Through to the navy's supply of vitamins by adding citrus to their rum in hope to defeat scurvy, he amongst other had acquired a taste for citrus. So the success of the newly born Daiquiri at the Army and Navy was enormous.

Other sources point to Cox creating the drink from his rations of Bacardi, limes, and sugar. His associate, Francesco Domenico Pagliuchi, a Cuban engineer, explained the origin in a 1948 editorial letter in the newspaper El Pais Havana.

== Personal life ==
Cox died on August 31, 1913, in New York City. He lived in Santiago de Cuba from the late 1890s until 1913, when failing health prompted him to return to New York. The writer and journalist Richard Harding Davis wrote his novel Soldiers of Fortune (1897) while a guest at Cox's house (O’Toole, 79).

Cox was a member of the Alpha Delta Phi fraternity, University Club of New York, University Club of Pittsburgh, and the Rainier Club of Seattle.

== See also ==
- Wet Wellies: Daiquiri history
- G.J.A. O’Toole, The Spanish War: An American Epic 1898 (New York: W.W. Norton, 1989), 79.
- Daiquiri Story
