= Sidecar (cocktail) =

Cocktail made with cognac, orange liqueur, and lemon

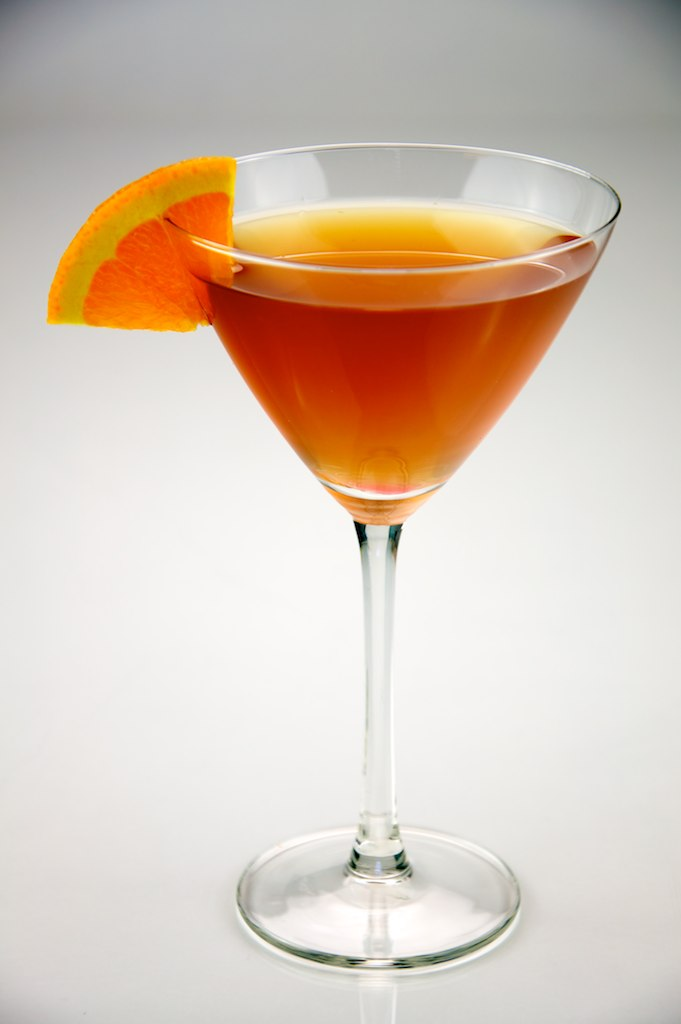
- Type: Cocktail
- Ingredients: 50 ml cognac; 20 ml triple sec; 20 ml fresh lemon juice
- Base spirit: Cognac
- Standard drinkware: Cocktail glass
- Served: Straight up: chilled, without ice
- Preparation: Pour all ingredients into a cocktail shaker, shake well with ice, strain into a chilled cocktail glass.

The sidecar is a cocktail traditionally made with brandy (usually cognac), orange liqueur (Cointreau, Grand Marnier, dry curaçao, or a triple sec), and lemon juice. It became popular in Paris and London in the early 1920s. Common modifications of the original recipe are a sugar rim, added sugar syrup, and an orange twist or lemon twist.

== Similar drinks ==
The sidecar is categorized as a daisy: a spirit, citrus juice, and a liqueur as sweetener. Other well-known daisies include the margarita (literally "daisy" in Spanish) and the white lady. Daisies are variants of the older sour formula, which use sugar for sweetening; daisies are more complex and often drier. Daisies in general and the sidecar in particular are considered more of a challenge for bartenders because the proportion of ingredients is more difficult to balance for liqueurs of variable sweetness.

In its ingredients, the drink is perhaps most closely related to the older brandy crusta, which differs both in presentation and in proportions of its components.

== History ==
=== Origin ===
The exact origin of the sidecar is unclear, but it is thought to have been invented around the end of World War I in either London or Paris. The drink was directly named for the motorcycle attachment, which was very commonly used at the time.

The Ritz Hotel in Paris claims origin of the drink. The first recipes for the sidecar appear in 1922, in Robert Vermeire's Cocktails and How to Mix Them and Harry MacElhone's Harry's ABC of Mixing Cocktails. It is one of six basic drinks listed in David A. Embury's The Fine Art of Mixing Drinks (1948).

In early editions of MacElhone's book, he cites the inventor as Pat MacGarry, "the popular bartender at Buck's Club, London", but in later editions he cites himself. While Vermiere states that the drink was "very popular in France. It was first introduced in London by MacGarry, the celebrated bartender of Buck's Club." Embury credits the invention of the drink to an American army captain in Paris during World War I and named after the motorcycle sidecar that the captain used.

The earliest recipe in MacElhone is: (Note: Reference is to the second edition in 1923, but this is a reprint (with different ads) of the first edition of 1922.)

229. Side-Car Cocktail.
⅓ Cointreau (Triple sec), ⅓ Brandy, ⅓ Lemon Juice.
(Recipe by MacGarry, the popular bar-tender at Buck's Club, London.)

Journalist O.O. McIntyre reports in his 1937 summary of a visit to New York City that bartenders there attributed the drink to American expatriates Erskine Gywnne and Basil Woon.

=== Ratios ===
Both MacElhone and Vermiere state the recipe as equal parts cognac, Cointreau, and lemon juice (1:1:1), now known as "the French school". Later, an "English school" of sidecars emerged, as found in the Savoy Cocktail Book (1930), which calls for two parts cognac and one part each of Cointreau and lemon juice (2:1:1).

According to Embury, the original sidecar had several ingredients, which were "refined away" (there is no evidence for this). Embury also states the drink is simply a daiquiri with brandy as its base rather than rum, and with Cointreau as the sweetening agent rather than sugar syrup. He recommends the same proportions (8:2:1) for both, making a much-less-sweet sidecar. However, Simon Difford, in his book Encyclopedia of Cocktails, notes Harry Craddock's ratio of 2:1:1 in The Savoy Cocktail Book, and then suggests a middle ground between Craddock's recipe and the "French school" equal parts recipe of 3:2:2, calling Embury's daiquiri formula "overly dry" for a sidecar.

=== Modifications ===
The earliest known mention of sugaring the rim on a sidecar glass is in the 1932 American cocktail book Wet Drinks for Dry People. This was popular by 1934, when it appeared in three books: Burke's Complete Cocktail & Drinking Recipes, Gordon's Cocktail & Food Recipes, and Drinks as They Are Mixed (a revised reprint of Paul E. Lowe's 1904 book).

Common modifications of the original recipe are a sugar rim, added sugar syrup, and an orange twist or lemon twist. Recipes of the craft cocktail renaissance of the 2000s are closer to the British ratio of 2:1:1, but almost always add sugar syrup, as the drink is otherwise considered too dry and tart.

== See also ==
- List of cocktails
- Margarita
- White Lady
