= Monkey gland sauce =

South African sauce

- Type: Condiment
- Place of origin: South Africa
- Main ingredients: Chutney; Tomato sauce (ketchup)
- Ingredients generally used: Onions; Vinegar; Garlic; Worcestershire sauce

Monkey gland sauce is a dark-coloured, thick, sweet and tangy sauce from South Africa. It is typically served as a topping for grilled steaks or burgers, but is also used as a marinade, a dipping sauce for onion rings and chips, or on roasted potatoes. It has been featured as a restaurant item since the 1930s, becoming a South African restaurant and fast food staple condiment.

== Ingredients ==
The main components of monkey gland sauce are chutney and tomato sauce (ketchup) – which result in a sweet mixture. Then, the addition of onions, vinegar, garlic and Worcestershire sauce, gives it a savoury-sweet flavour.

== Naming ==
Despite its name, the sauce does not contain any monkey glands.

There are various theories on the origins of the sauce but the most likely is that it originated with French chefs at the old Carlton Hotel in Johannesburg. South African diners added sauces such as chutney, tomato sauce, and Worcester sauce to the French dishes before eating them. Thus, the disgruntled chefs combined all the condiments to create a sauce which they named monkey gland sauce. There was speculation at the time that monkey glands could slow down ageing.

A more outlandish theory is that it was named after Russian-born French scientist, Dr Serge Abrahamovitch Voronoff, who was a regular visitor at the Savoy Hotel in London. One of his medical experiments involved grafting monkey testicle tissue onto impotent men as a cure. The hotel renamed his favourite steak dish the "monkey gland steak" when he became famous. Then an ex-Savoy waiter brought it over to South Africa in the 1930s.

== See also ==
- Monkey Gland – cocktail
- List of dips
- List of sauces
