= Daiquiri =

Cocktail

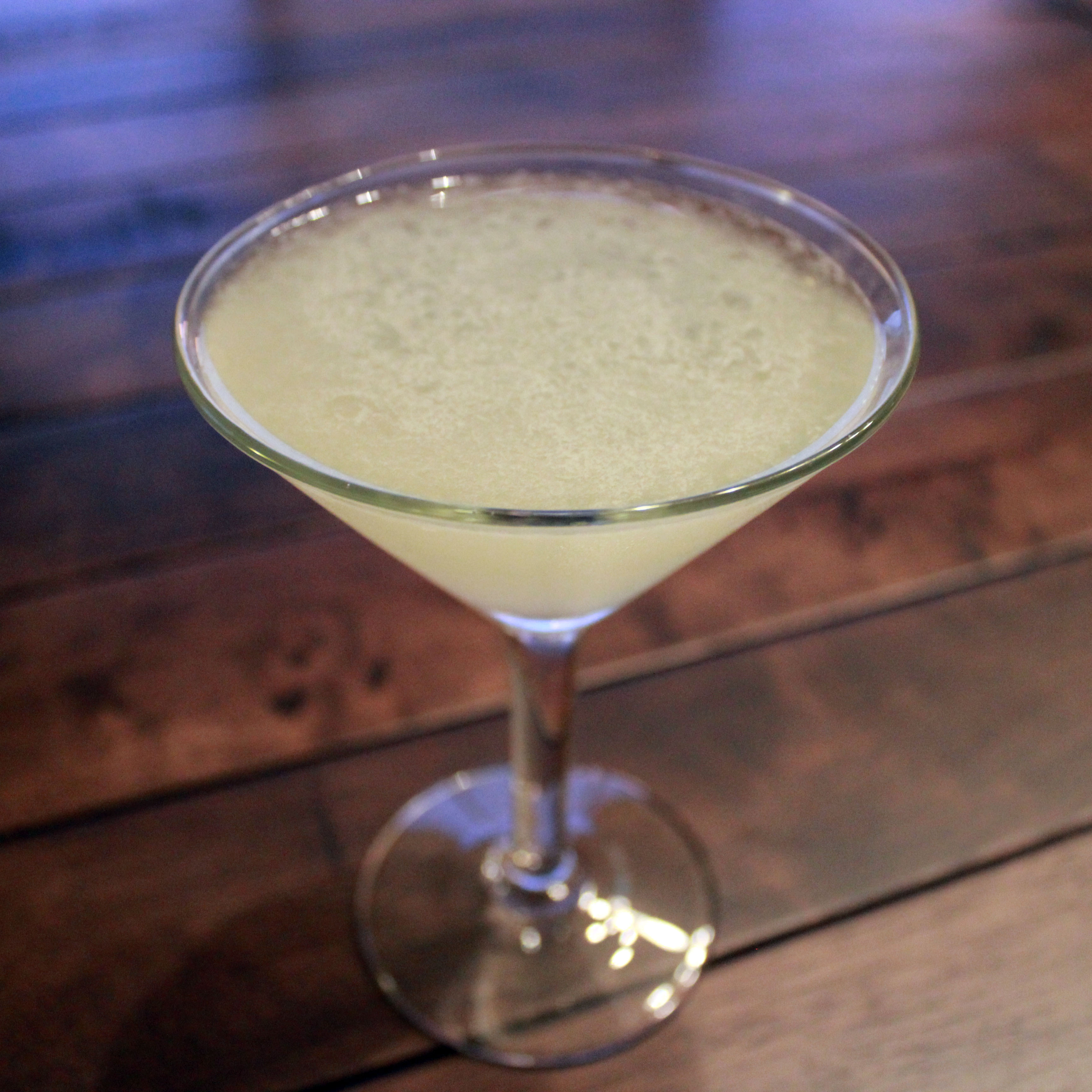
- Classic daiquiri served in a cocktail glass
- Type: Cocktail
- Origin: Cuba
- Ingredients: 60 ml white Cuban rum; 20 ml fresh lime juice; 2 bar spoons superfine sugar
- Standard drinkware: Cocktail glass
- Served: Straight up: chilled, without ice
- Preparation: In a cocktail shaker add all ingredients. Stir well to dissolve the sugar. Add ice and shake. Strain into chilled cocktail glass.

The daiquiri (/ˈdaɪkəri, ˈdæk-/; Spanish: daiquirí [dajkiˈɾi]) is a cocktail whose main ingredients are rum, citrus juice (typically lime juice), and sugar or other sweetener.

The daiquiri is one of the six basic drinks listed in David A. Embury's classic The Fine Art of Mixing Drinks, which also lists some variations.

== Origins ==
Daiquirí is also the name of a beach and an iron mine near Santiago de Cuba in eastern Cuba, and is a word of Taíno origin.

Historians widely agree that the cocktail was invented by an American mining engineer named Jennings Cox, who was in Cuba (then at the tail-end of the Spanish Captaincy-General government) at the time of the Spanish–American War of 1898. It is also possible that William A. Chanler, a U.S. congressman who purchased the Santiago iron mines in 1902, introduced the daiquiri to clubs in New York in that year.

Originally the drink was served in a tall glass packed with cracked ice. A teaspoon of sugar was poured over the ice, and the juice of one or two limes was squeezed over the sugar. Two or three ounces of white rum completed the mixture. The glass was then frosted with a long-handled spoon. Later the daiquiri evolved to be mixed in a shaker with the same ingredients but with shaved ice. After a thorough shaking, it was poured into a chilled coupe glass.

The Daiquiri was subsequently refined and popularized by Emelio "Maragato" Gonzalez and Constantino "Constante" Ribalaigua Vert in Havana.

The basic recipe for a daiquiri is also similar to the grog British sailors drank aboard ships from the 1780s. By 1795 the Royal Navy daily grog ration contained rum, water, ¾ ounce of lemon or lime juice, and 2 ounces of sugar. This was a common drink across the Caribbean, and as soon as ice became available this was included instead of the water.

Consumption of the drink remained localized until 1909, when Rear Admiral Lucius W. Johnson, a U.S. Navy medical officer, tried Cox's drink. Johnson subsequently introduced it to the Army and Navy Club in Washington, D.C., and drinkers of the daiquiri increased over the space of a few decades. It was one of the favorite drinks of the writer Ernest Hemingway and U.S. President John F. Kennedy.

The drink became popular in the 1940s. World War II rationing made whiskey and vodka hard to come by, yet rum was easily obtainable owing to U.S. President Franklin D. Roosevelt's Good Neighbor policy, which opened up trade and travel relations with Latin America, Cuba, and the Caribbean. The Good Neighbor policy, also known as the Pan-American program, helped make Latin America fashionable. Consequently, rum-based drinks (once frowned upon as the choice of sailors and down-and-outs) also became fashionable, and the daiquiri saw tremendous popularity in the U.S.

== Variations ==
- Hemingway daiquiri (Hemingway special) – or papa doble: two and a half jiggers of white rum, juice of two limes and half a grapefruit, six drops of maraschino liqueur, without sugar.
- Mulata daiquiri: rum mixed with either coffee or chocolate liqueur and with fresh lime juice and sugar syrup
- Old Rose daiquiri: strawberry syrup and rum along with two teaspoons of sugar and lime juice
- Royal Bermuda Yacht Club: Barbados rum, fresh lime juice, Cointreau, and falernum, recorded since 1941.

== Frozen daiquiri ==
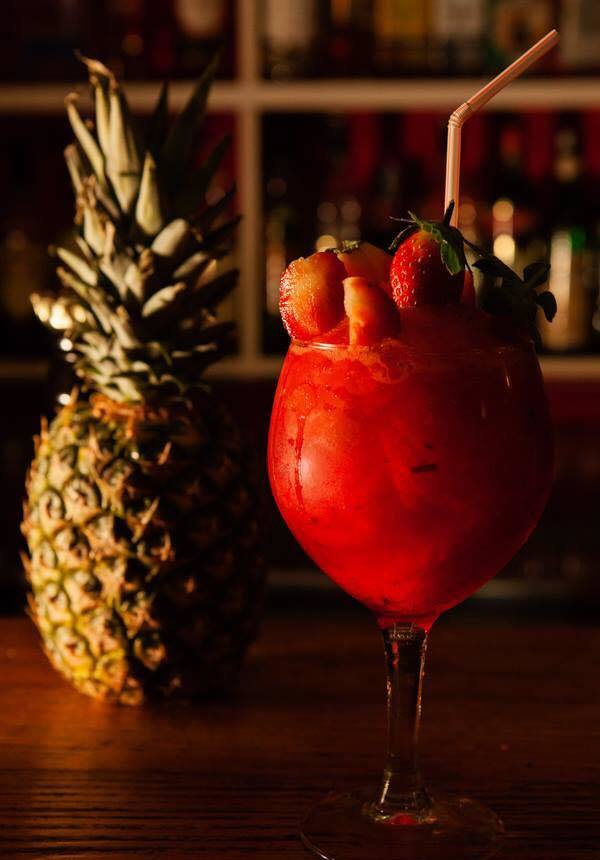
A strawberry daiquiri

A wide variety of alcoholic mixed drinks made with finely pulverized ice are often called frozen daiquirí. These drinks can also be combined and poured from a blender, eliminating the need for manual pulverisation and producing a texture similar to a smoothie. On larger scales, such drinks are often commercially made in larger machines and come in various flavors with various alcohol or liquors. Another way to create a frozen daiquiri (mostly fruit-flavored variants) is by using frozen limeade, providing the required texture, sweetness and sourness all at once.

=== Variations ===
- Banana daiquiri – regular daiquiri with half a banana.
- Strawberry daiquiri – a blender drink of puréed whole strawberries, rum, cane sugar and lime juice

== See also ==
- Floridita - A historic bar linked to Daiquiri in Havana, Cuba
- List of cocktails
- Caipirinha – similar Brazilian cocktail
- Ti' Punch – similar French Caribbean cocktail
- Mojito – other popular and similar rum cocktail, adding lime, mint and soda
