= Daiquirí =

- Village

- Location of Daiquirí in Cuba
- Coordinates: 19°55′43″N 75°38′25″W
- Country: Cuba
- Province: Santiago de Cuba
- Municipality: Santiago de Cuba
- Time zone: UTC-5 (EST)
- Area code: +53-22

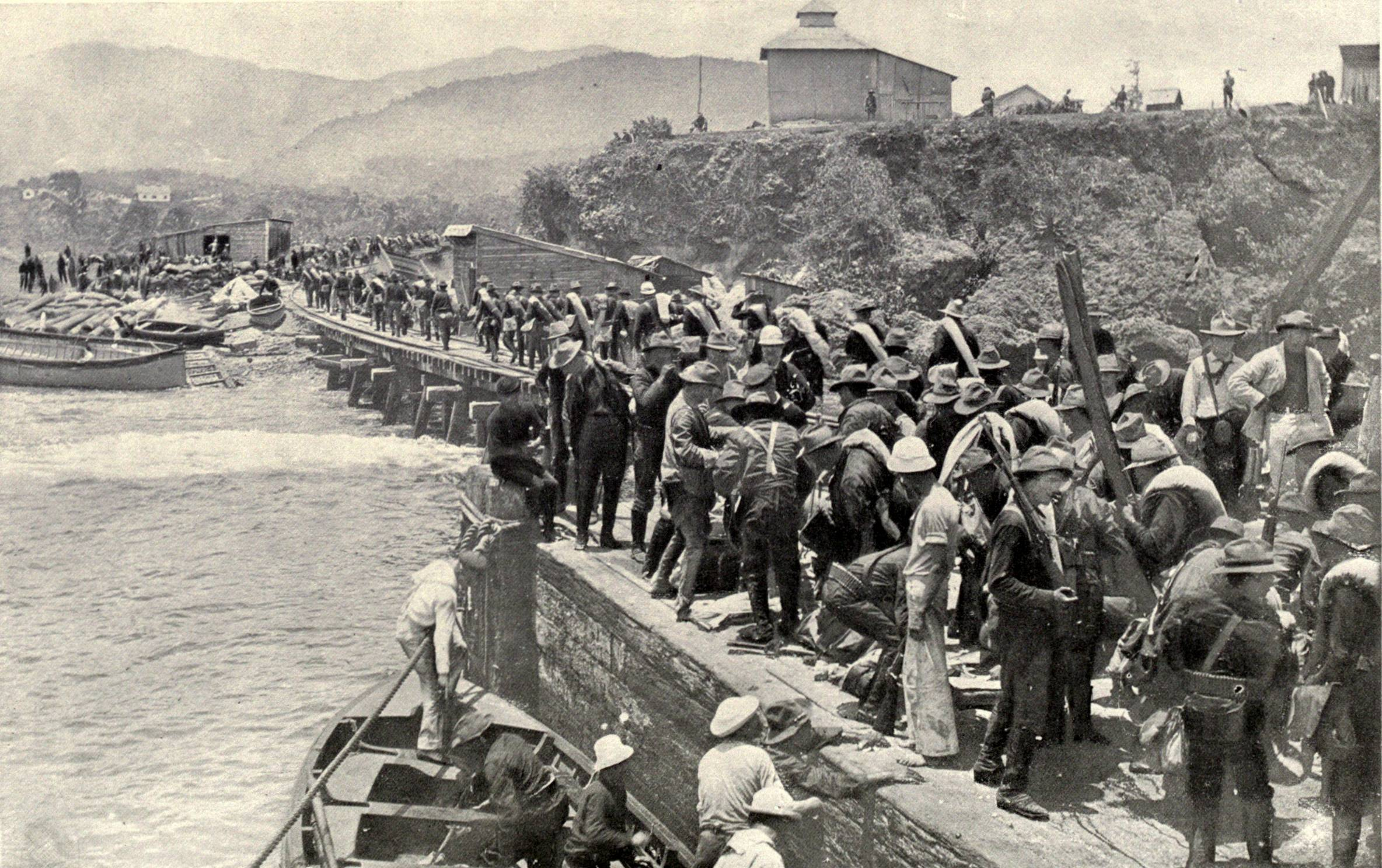
American troops landing at Daiquirí in 1898

Daiquirí (Spanish pronunciation: [dajkiˈɾi]) is a small village, 14 miles east of Santiago de Cuba. It became a focal point of the United States invasion of Cuba in the Spanish–American War.

== Overview ==
Spanish General Arsenio Linares y Pombo ordered the area from Daiquirí to Siboney fortified in anticipation of U.S. disembarkments there. On June 20, 1898, U.S. Navy Admiral William T. Sampson, U.S. Army General William Rufus Shafter and Cuban General Calixto García planned an invasion whereby the navy would shell Daiquirí, García's Cuban troops would attack the Spaniards, and, in the meantime, U.S. ships would transport some Cuban troops to Cabañas to cut off communications and supply.

The landing two days later went almost according to plan. Sampson fired on Daiquirí, dispersing the 300 or so Spanish troops there. Some 16,000 U.S. soldiers waded ashore in the surf as the diversion at Cabañas proved highly effective. Other troops landed at Siboney, but Daiquirí continued as a storage area until U.S. forces took Santiago.

The alcoholic cocktail, the daiquiri, was supposedly named for the area. There is an iron mine near Daiquirí, which is a word of Taíno origin. The cocktail was supposedly invented about 1900 in a bar named Venus in Santiago, about 23 miles east of the mine, by a group of American mining engineers. Among the engineers present were Jennings Cox, General Manager of the Spanish American Iron Co., J. Francis Linthicum, C. Manning Combs, George W. Pfeiffer, De Berneire Whitaker, C. Merritt Holmes and Proctor O. Persing. Although stories persist that Cox invented the drink when he ran out of gin while entertaining American guests, the drink evolved naturally due to the prevalence of limes, sugar and rum.

== See also ==
- El Caney
- El Cobre
