= Boulevardier (cocktail) =

1920s cocktail of whiskey, sweet vermouth, and Campari

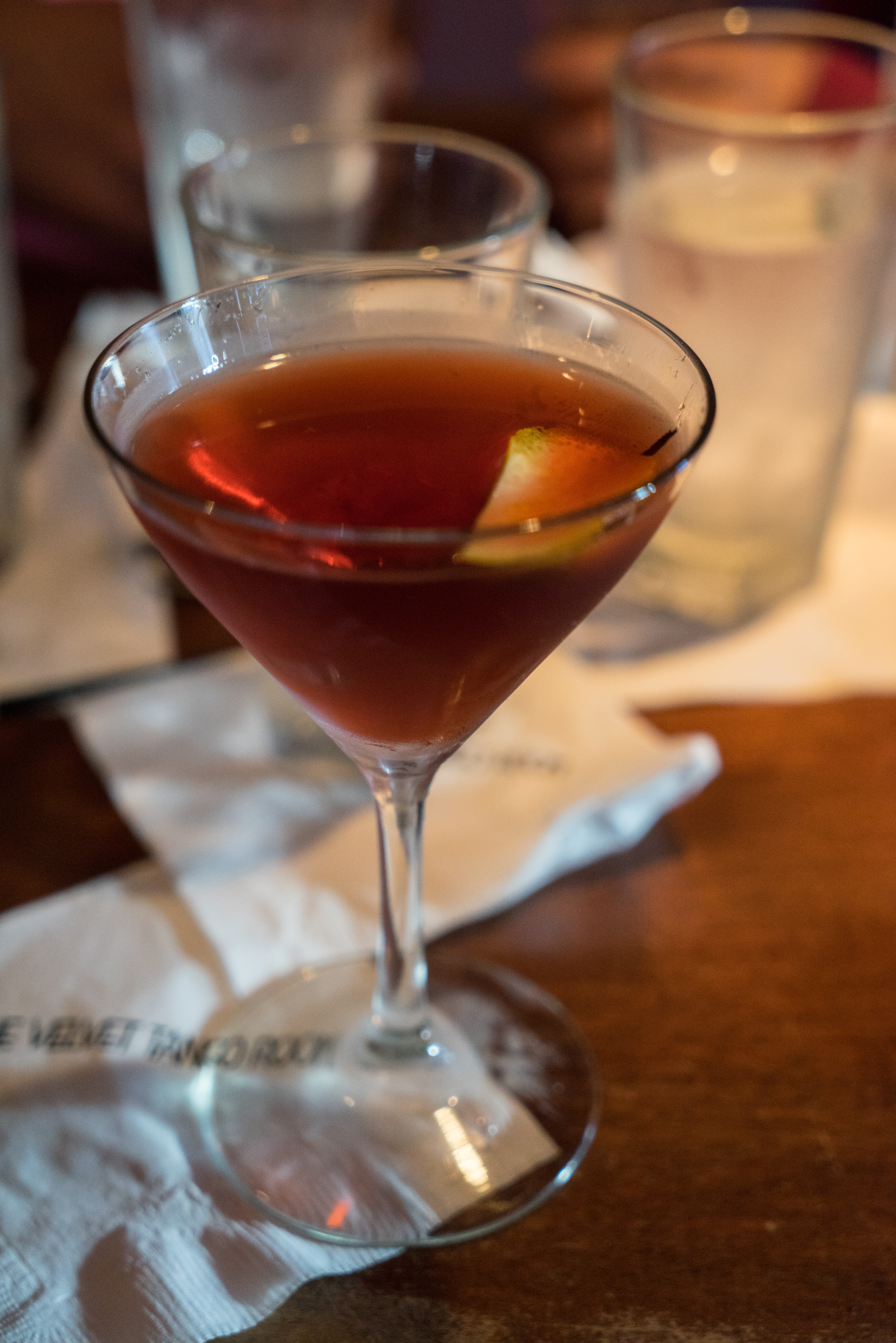
- Type: Cocktail
- Ingredients: 45 ml bourbon or rye whiskey; 30 ml bitter Campari; 30 ml sweet red vermouth
- Standard drinkware: Cocktail glass
- Standard garnish: Orange zest, optionally a lemon zest
- Served: Straight up: chilled, without ice
- Preparation: Pour all ingredients into mixing glass with ice cubes. Stir well. Strain into a chilled cocktail glass.

The boulevardier cocktail is an alcoholic drink composed of whiskey, sweet vermouth, and Campari. It originated as an obscure cocktail in late 1920s Paris, and was largely forgotten for 80 years, before being rediscovered in the late 2000s as part of the craft cocktail movement. It rapidly rose in popularity in the 2010s as a variant of the negroni, and became an IBA official cocktail in 2020.

== History ==
The Boulevardier first appeared in print in the Parisian cocktail book Barflies and Cocktails (1927), where it is ascribed to Erskine Gwynne, an American-born writer who founded a monthly magazine in Paris called Boulevardier, which appeared from 1927 to 1932. (Note: Upon launching the magazine, which was apparently both humorous and literary, Gwynne said it would be "fast but clean". The magazine published advertisements seeking subscribers in both Harry's ABC of Mixing Cocktails (1919, revised annually) and Barflies and Cocktails (1927, p. 111), the memoir and recipe collections of Harry MacElhone of Harry's New York Bar in Paris. MacElhone credited Gwynne, one of his regular customers, with inventing the drink.) The cocktail appears, not in the main list of recipes, but in the essay "Cocktails About Town" by Arthur Moss, which describes cocktails by men-about-town. The boulevardier is described as an equal parts cocktail:

Now is the time for all good Barflies to come to the aid of the party, since Erskinne [sic] Gwynne crashed in with his Boulevardier Cocktail; 1/3 Campari, 1/3 Italian vermouth, 1/3 Bourbon whisky.

The very similar "Old pal" cocktail appears in the same essay, differing only in using Canadian Club whisky, rather than bourbon.

The boulevardier did not catch on: no references to it have been found to it in cocktail books between 1927 and 2007, and it is absent from major collections. This contrasts with the Old pal, which appeared in the main list of recipes in later editions of MacElhone, such as MacElhone (1952), and was well-known enough to be one of the 50 cocktails in the inaugural 1961 list of IBA official cocktails. This also contrasts with the negroni, which only appeared in the late 1940s, but became popular in the 1950s and also appeared in the 1961 IBA list.

The cocktail was rediscovered and popularized first by Ted Haigh, later by others, starting with an article in the 2007 March/April issue of Imbibe, writing as "Dr. Cocktail". Haigh subsequently published a recipe in Haigh (2009a), together with further articles. The cocktail was further popularized by Paul Clarke, who learned about it from Haigh, and then published recipes on Serious Eats and Clarke (2015). The boulevardier was still rare in the early 2010s, but by the mid-2010s was popular.

The boulevardier was listed as an IBA official cocktail starting in the 2020 list, in the "Unforgettables" section.

== Similar drinks ==
The Old pal is a similar contemporary cocktail, appearing in the same essay in MacElhone (1927), originally differentiated by using rye whiskey (Canadian Club) instead of bourbon (otherwise identical equal parts cocktails with Italian vermouth and Campari). It is distinguished primarily by using dry "French" vermouth instead of sweet "Italian" vermouth; the IBA recipes also differ as equal parts (1:1:1) instead of the boulevardier's 1½:1:1 (3:2:2) and the whiskey always being rye, instead of bourbon or rye.

The boulevardier is similar to a Negroni, sharing two of its three ingredients. It is differentiated primarily by its use of bourbon whiskey or rye whiskey as its principal component instead of gin. In the IBA standard recipes it is also distinguished by being served straight up (no ice, stemmed glass) instead of down on the rocks (ice, tumbler); having more spirit than other components (1½:1:1), instead of having equal parts; and being garnished with an orange twist, rather than an orange slice. All of these other than whiskey vs. gin vary in specific recipes, however.

== Variations ==
Recipes vary the proportions of its components. The original 1927 recipe is equal parts (1:1:1), but Haigh's 2007 revival is 3:2:2, calling for 1 1/2 parts rather than 1 part whiskey, and these are the proportions used in the IBA standard and many boulevardier recipes. Others are heavier still (2:1:1), and call for two parts bourbon to one part vermouth and one part Campari.
