= Skevos Zervos =

Skevophylax Georges Zervos, also known as Skevos Zervos (Greek: Σκευοφύλαξ Γεώργιος Ζερβός, 1875–1966) was a prominent Greek Professor; a pioneer surgeon in Transplants and Telemedicine, who became a local and national benefactor in Greece.

Skevos was born and raised in Kalymnos City or Pothia, the capital of the island Kalymnos, Greece. Skevos was a member of a local wealthy, influential, distinguished and aristocratic family on the island. The family of Skevos had built the local hospital and local orphanage on the island, and through this they became local benefactors.

His brother was a local prominent citizen called Kleanthes Zervos and his nephew was the local Christian Bishop of Kalymnos, Nikephoros Zervos whom in 1905 founded and established the Nikephoros High School, the first high school set up in Kalymnos. In front of the high school, there is a statue bust dedicated to Nikephoros Zervos.

Skevos in his student years was a traditional free naked sponge diver in Kalymnos. Skevos dived with a traditional and multi-purpose tool called a Skandalopetra, which was used as a steering wheel/base tied as a line of communication with the boat. Diving for sponges is a part of the traditional diving heritage of Greece and the Aegean Sea.

In 1910, Skevos was the first surgeon to perform the testicle transplantation from an ape to a man. This operation was successful. In 1934, this surgery was officially recognised by the Russian Surgeon Serge Voronoff.

In 1919, Skevos assisted the Greek Politician Eleftherios Venizelos who traveled to the Paris Peace Conference in regaining the Dodecanese as a part of the modern state of Greece. On March 7, 1948, he was a paragon of the Central Dodecanese Committee and was present in Rhodes, when the United Nations, returned the Dodecanese region to the then government of Greece.

Skevos was a Medical Professor of the School of Medicine at the National and Kapodistrian University of Athens. There Skevos developed a system that allowed him to examine a patient from a distance. This examination was concerning auscultation and cardiac pulses. The data could be transmitted in any place around the world. Virtues of the system were demonstrated in several experiments conducted in plenary sessions of the Athens Medical Society at the National University of Athens, at the National Technical University of Athens and at the Athens Academy during the signals were transmitted from several Athens hospitals and various Greek cities. His scientific research was published in the Annals of the Athens Medical Society (1946–1956). His system was proposed to be used on board of the Greek Ships that were offering regular service between Piraeus and New York City. The communication at this time could not be afforded and the system was not used.

Skevos in his elder years married, however he had no children. In his honor the "disease of the naked sponge divers" was named "Skevos Zervos disease". As a posthumous honor, the local Kalymnian Government erected a life-size statue of him.
