= Paradise (cocktail) =

Apéritif of gin, apricot brandy and orange juice

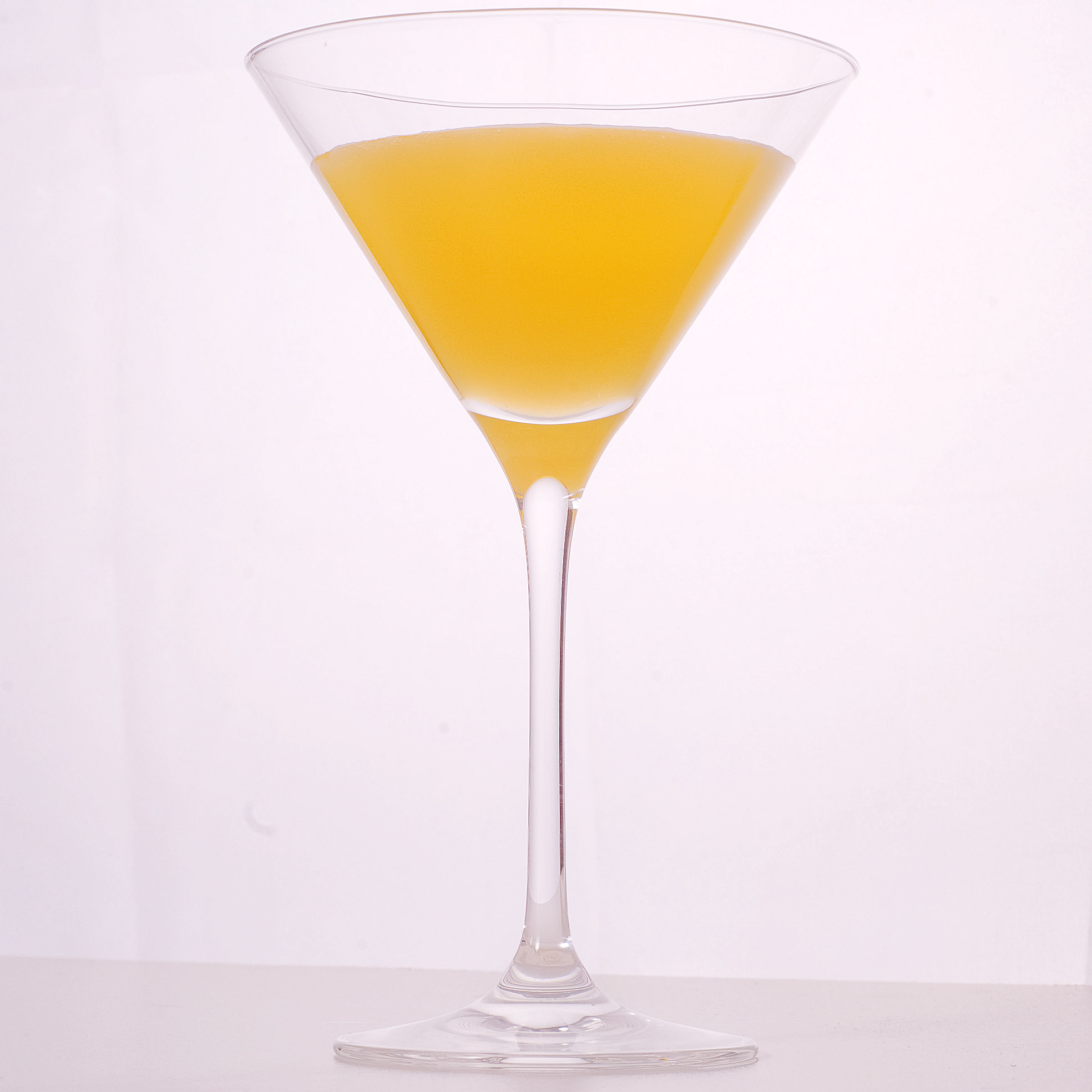
- Type: Cocktail
- Ingredients: 3.5 cl (7 parts) gin; 2 cl (4 parts) apricot brandy; 1.5 cl (3 parts) orange juice
- Base spirit: Gin
- Website: iba-world.com/iba-cocktails/
- Standard drinkware: Cocktail glass
- Served: Straight up: chilled, without ice
- Preparation: Shake together over ice. Strain into cocktail glass and serve chilled.

The Paradise is an IBA official cocktail, and is classified as a "pre-dinner" drink, an apéritif.

The earliest known in-print recipe for the Paradise Cocktail was written by Harry MacElhone in 1922. The canonical version is associated with Harry Craddock in 1930. This cocktail is prepared using gin, apricot brandy, and orange juice in a 2:1:1 ratio, with a splash of lemon juice.

== In popular culture ==
The Paradise cocktail plays a key part in the 1932 Warner Bros. romantic film One Way Passage as the drink of the two star-crossed lovers played by Kay Francis and William Powell.

The Paradise cocktail was popularized by rapper Snoop Dogg in the track “Gin and Juice” on his debut album Doggystyle. On May 27, 2018, Snoop Dogg, Warren G and Michael Voltaggio set the world record for the largest "Gin and Juice", a 500-litre (132 gallon) paradise cocktail that contained 180 bottles of gin, 154 bottles of apricot brandy, and 144 liters (38 gallons) of orange juice.

== See also ==
- List of cocktails
