= Between the Sheets (play) =

- Original language: English
- Written by: Jordi Mand
- Characters: Teresa; Marion
- Subject: A mother of a student approaches the teacher with several personal complaints.
- Genre: Drama
- Setting: Teresa's Third Grade Classroom - Present

Premiere
- Date: September 18, 2012
- Place: Tarragon Theatre; Toronto, Ontario, Canada

Between the Sheets is a one-act play written by Jordi Mand. It received its first full production with Nightwood Theatre in Toronto in 2012, and it has also been produced by The Basement Theatre in Auckland, New Zealand in 2013 and Pi Theatre in Vancouver, British Columbia, Canada in 2014.

The play deals with both special-needs children and sexual affairs, and includes drama and occasional suspense.

The script was released in print in 2014 by the Playwrights Canada Press.

== Characters ==
Characters in order of appearance
Character	Description
Teresa	Alex's young third grade teacher. She is in an affair with Alex's father, Curtis. Since Marion is often away at her work, Teresa gets to know Alex very well and realizes that he may be suffering from serious ADD.
Marion	Alex's mother and Curtis's wife. Marion is a business woman, and therefore spends little time with her husband and son. After finding out that Teresa and Curtis are having an affair, she shows up unexpectedly at Teresa's parent-teacher interviews.

Other characters mentioned
Character	Description
Alex	Marion and Curtis's seven-year-old son and Teresa's student. Due to spending more time with Curtis because of their affair, Teresa begins to think that Alex has serious ADD.
Curtis	Marion's husband who is having an affair with Teresa.

=== Casts ===
Casts
Character	Original Toronto cast (2012)	Original Auckland cast (2013)	Original Vancouver cast (2014)
Teresa	Christine Horne	Beth Allen	Caitriona Murphy
Marion	Susan Coyne	Jennifer Ward-Lealand	Stephanie Moroz
