= The Fine Art of Mixing Drinks =

1948 book about cocktails

- First edition (published by Doubleday)
- Author: David A. Embury
- Language: English
- Published: 1948 (Doubleday)
- Publication place: United States

The Fine Art of Mixing Drinks is a book about cocktails by David A. Embury, first published in 1948. The book is noteworthy for its witty, highly opinionated and conversational tone, as well as its categorization of cocktails into two main types: aromatic and sour; its categorization of ingredients into three categories: the base, modifying agents, and special flavorings and coloring agents; and its 1:2:8 ratio (1 part sweet, 2 parts sour, 8 parts base) for sour type cocktails.

== Basic principles ==
Embury first outlines some basic principles for fashioning a quality cocktail:

- It should be made from good-quality, high-proof liquors.
- It should whet rather than dull the appetite. Thus, it should never be sweet or syrupy, or contain too much fruit juice, egg or cream.
- It should be dry, with sufficient alcoholic flavor, yet smooth and pleasing to the palate.
- It should be pleasing to the eye.
- It should be well iced.

Embury stresses frequently that the drink will never be any better than the quality of the cheapest ingredient in it, and hence he stresses constantly the need for the highest quality spirits, liqueurs, cordials, and modifiers (fresh squeezed lemons, etc.). He also repeatedly stresses that a cocktail, in the classic sense (a before-dinner drink) should have no more than the slightest touch of sweetness to it, and deplores the use of drinks like the Brandy Alexander as preprandial cocktails, as they dull rather than sharpen the appetite. He does not denigrate sweet drinks as such, but rather points out that they are excellent after dinner or mid-afternoon drinks accompanying cake or chocolate cookies, but they are anathema as a "cocktail" before a large meal.

In terms of IBA Official Cocktails, Embury describes classic Before-Dinner Cocktails, which whet the appetite, not other categories.

== Components of a cocktail ==
Embury breaks all cocktail ingredients down into three categories:

The base is the principal ingredient of the cocktail. It is typically a single spirit such as rum, gin, or whiskey, and typically makes up 75 percent or more of the total volume of the cocktail before icing.

The modifying agent is the ingredient that gives the cocktail its character. Its function is to soften the raw alcohol taste of the base while enhancing its natural flavor. Typical modifying agents are aromatic wines (such as vermouth) and spirits (such as Fernet Branca or Amer Picon), bitters, fruit juices and "smoothing agents" such as sugar, eggs, and cream.

Special flavoring and coloring agents include liqueurs (such as Grand Marnier or Chartreuse), Cordials, bitters like Angostura Bitters, etc. and non-alcoholic flavored syrups (such as grenadine or orgeat syrup). These are typically used in place of simple syrup, and are to be used sparingly.

== Categories of cocktails ==
Embury breaks all cocktails down into two categories:

1. Cocktails of the aromatic type use as modifying agents bitters or aromatic wines or spirits.
2. Cocktails of the sour type use as modifying agents a fruit juice (typically, lemon or lime) and sugar. For these a ratio of 1 part sweet to 2 parts sour to 8 parts base is generally recommended. However, Embury makes it very clear that he thinks the idea that a drink must be made according to one exact recipe preposterous, and that the final arbiter is always your taste. He suggests trying different ratios, finding the one that is most pleasing to you, and sticking with it.

Once one understands the basic components of each type of drink, new cocktails can be created by substituting a different base or modifying agent or by adding a special flavoring or coloring agent. A daiquiri, for example, is nothing more than a whiskey sour with rum substituted for whiskey as the base and lime juice substituted for lemon juice as a modifying agent. An entire chapter of the book ("Roll Your Own") is dedicated to this premise.

== Six basic drinks ==
Embury's six basic drinks are the Daiquiri, the Jack Rose, the Manhattan, the Martini, the Old Fashioned, and the Sidecar. Embury's preferred recipe for each is:

Daiquiri

- 8 parts white Cuban rum
- 2 parts lime juice
- 1 part simple syrup

Shake with a large amount of finely crushed ice, then strain into a chilled cocktail glass.

Jack Rose

- 8 parts applejack
- 2 parts lemon juice
- 1 part Grenadine

Shake vigorously with ice and strain into a cocktail glass. Garnish with a twist of lemon, if desired.

Manhattan

- 5 parts American whiskey
- 1 part Italian (sweet) vermouth
- dash of Angostura bitters to each drink

Stir with ice, strain into a cocktail glass and serve garnished with a Maraschino cherry.

Martini

- 7 parts English gin
- 1 part French (dry) vermouth

Stir with ice, strain into a cocktail glass, twist lemon peel over the top and serve garnished with an olive, preferably one stuffed with any kind of nut. Embury also states that sherry is a nice substitute for vermouth.

Old Fashioned

- 12 parts American whiskey
- 1 part simple syrup
- 1–3 dashes Angostura bitters to each drink

In an old-fashioned glass, add bitters to simple syrup and stir. Add about 1 ounce of whiskey and stir again. Add two cubes of cracked, but not crushed, ice and top off with the rest of the whiskey. Twist lemon peel over the top and serve garnished with the lemon peel and a maraschino cherry.

Sidecar

- 8 parts Cognac or Armagnac
- 2 parts lemon juice
- 1 part Cointreau or triple sec

Shake vigorously with ice and strain into a cocktail glass. Garnish with a twist of lemon, if desired.

== Chapters ==
From the 1958 edition:

1. Basic Principles
2. Glassware, Gimmicks, and Gadgets
3. Lemons, Limes and Liquors
4. Pertinent Pointers
5. Six Basic Cocktails
6. Roll Your Own
7. Liqueurs
8. The Use and Abuse of Liquor
9. Bureaucratic and Other Idiosyncrasies
10. Vodka Drinks
11. Short Drinks, Including More Cocktails
12. Tall Drinks
13. Party Drinks
14. Hot Drinks
15. Picker-Uppers
16. Food and Drink
17. Conclusion

== Reception ==
The book gained immediate popularity and quickly became one of the most referenced and cited cocktail books. In modern times, the book has been described as "famous" and a "Bible" for crafting cocktails.

== Editions ==
- Embury, David (1948) [1948]. The Fine Art of Mixing Drinks (1st ed.). Garden City, N.Y: Doubleday. LCC TX951 .E55.
- Embury, David (1953) [1953]. The Fine Art of Mixing Drinks (1st ed.). London, United Kingdom: Faber and Faber. LCC TX951 .E55 1953.
- Embury, David (1952) [1948]. The Fine Art of Mixing Drinks (2nd ed.). Garden City, N.Y: Doubleday. LCC TX951 .E55 1952.
- Embury, David (1958) [1958]. The Fine Art of Mixing Drinks. illustrated by Nathan Gluck (New rev. ed.). Garden City, N.Y: Doubleday. LCC TX951 .E55 1958.
- Embury, David (1961) [1958]. The Fine Art of Mixing Drinks (New rev./3rd American ed.). Garden City, N.Y: Dolphin Books. OCLC 4183957.
- Embury, David (2008) [1958]. The Fine Art of Mixing Drinks. illustrated by Nathan Gluck, foreword by Robert Hess, article "A Look at the Book" by Audrey Saunders (Reprint of new rev. ed.). New York, N.Y: Mud Puddle Books. ISBN 978-1-60311-164-5.
