= Pascal Olivier Count de Negroni =

French general

Pascal-Olivier de Negroni
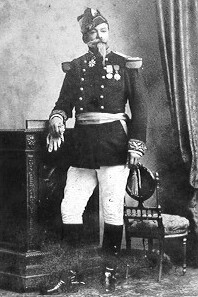
- Born: 4 April 1829; Castello di San Colombano, Corsica
- Died: 22 October 1913 (aged 84) Alençon, France
- Branch: French Army
- Service years: 1847–1891
- Rank: Brigadier General
- Commands: 2ème Brigade de Cuirassiers (1884)
- Conflicts: Franco Prussian War of 1870; Battle of Reichshoffen; Battle of Sedan
- Awards: Officer of the Legion of Honor; Commander of the Legion of Honor

Pascal-Olivier de Negroni de Cardi, Comte de Negroni (4 April 1829 – 22 October 1913) was a French general. He led the charge of Cuirassiers in the Battle of Reichshoffen during the Franco-Prussian War of 1870.

== Biography ==
Negroni was born in the Castle of San Colombano, also known as the Castello di San Colombano in Rogliano a commune in the Haute-Corse department of France on the island of Corsica. He joined the French Army at age 18. On 6 August 1870, he led the legendary charge of cuirassiers in the second Battle of Reichshoffen (also known as "The Battle of Wörth") during the opening stages of the Franco Prussian War of 1870. Negroni was decorated on 20 August 1870 with Officer of the Legion of Honor.

On 27 December 1884, he was promoted to Brigadier General of the Second Brigade of Cuirassiers and on 4 May 1889 he was named Commander of the Legion of Honor.

He served in the military until 1891, retiring after 44 years of military service.

In addition to his military accomplishments, Pascal Olivier has been credited with inventing the famous "Negroni Cocktail" (equal parts of Campari, Gin, and Sweet Vermouth, served in a short glass over ice and garnished with an orange wedge). Experts consider Camillo Negroni the inventor. However, Colonel Hector Andres Negroni and his brother Noel Xavier Negroni, members of the Negroni family recently researched the family archives and discovered there never was a Count Camillo Negroni. According to family documents, the true inventor of the "Negroni Cocktail" is Pascal Olivier de Negroni de Cardi, Comte de Negroni, their fourth cousin. Although both prevailing theories are impossible as one states he invented the drink prior to the invention of Campari, an ingredient, and the other states he invented it in 1914, the year after Negroni's death.

== Military decoration ==
Negroni was awarded the Officier of the French Légion d'honneur.
