= Monkey gland (cocktail) =

Gin-based cocktail

Monkey Gland
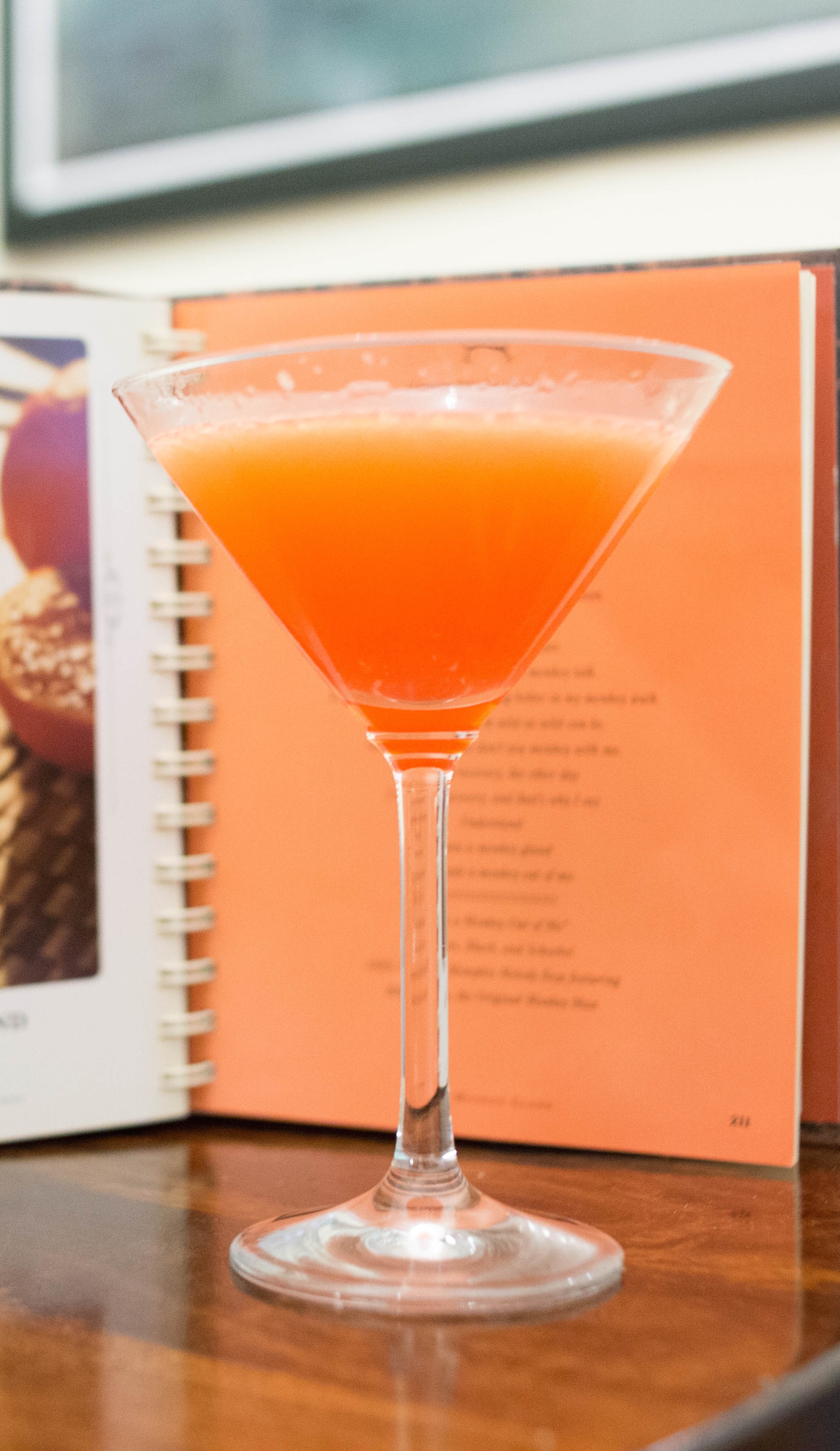
- Type: Cocktail
- Ingredients: 45 ml gin; 45 ml orange juice; 1 tablespoon absinthe; 1 tablespoon grenadine
- Base spirit: Gin
- Website: iba-world.com/iba-cocktails/
- Standard drinkware: Cocktail glass
- Served: Straight up: chilled, without ice
- Preparation: Pour all ingredients into a cocktail shaker, shake well with ice, strain into a chilled cocktail glass.

The Monkey Gland is a cocktail of gin, orange juice, grenadine and absinthe created in the 1920s by Harry MacElhone, owner of the famous Harry's New York Bar in Paris, France.

Some recipes substitute absinthe with pastis or Bénédictine.

The cocktail combines the sweetness of orange with the herbal, slightly bitter notes of absinthe, resulting in a flavor profile that reflects both ingredients.

It is named after the pseudo-scientific idea that grafting monkey testicle tissue into humans would increase longevity, the idea developed by the Russian doctor Serge Voronoff.
