= David A. Embury =

American attorney and cocktail author

- Born: David Augustus Embury; November 3, 1886; Pine Woods, New York, U.S.
- Died: July 6, 1960 (aged 73); New Rochelle, New York, U.S.
- Education: Cornell University, 1908; Columbia Law School, 1916
- Occupations: Tax attorney; author; mixologist
- Notable work: The Fine Art of Mixing Drinks (1948)

David Augustus Embury (November 3, 1886 – July 6, 1960) was an American tax attorney, mixologist and author of The Fine Art of Mixing Drinks (1948), an encyclopedia of the 20th century cocktail.

== Life and career ==
David Augustus Embury was born in Pine Woods, New York on November 3, 1886. Embury graduated from Cornell University in 1908 and taught high school for five years. He enrolled in Columbia Law School in 1912, graduating in 1916. He enlisted in the photographic branch of the United States Army Air Service in 1917, attaining the rank of sergeant first class before being demoted to private, and later commissioned as a second lieutenant.

He was a senior tax partner with the Manhattan law firm of Curtis, Mallet-Prevost, Colt & Mosle. He became a member of the Acacia fraternity at Columbia Law School on January 17, 1914. He was also a member of Phi Alpha Delta Law Fraternity. He was the first Acacian to become chairman of the North American Interfraternity Conference. He served as chairman of the National Interfraternity Conference from November 29, 1946, to November 28, 1947. During this time he vocally opposed desegregation, believing it to be the work of communists.

== The Fine Art of Mixing Drinks ==
Embury decided to pursue his love of bartending in the late 1940s, authoring the book The Fine Art of Mixing Drinks in 1948. The book is noteworthy for its highly opinionated, witty and conversational tone, as well as its categorization of cocktails and its categorization of ingredients. It also contains sections on glassware, bar equipment, a discussion of several different types of bitters, and much other minutiae. He includes in the book a recipe for a cocktail called an "Acacia", referencing the Acacia fraternity.

Embury had "never been engaged in any of the manifold branches of the liquor business" and was experienced "entirely as a consumer and as a shaker-upper of drinks for the delectation of my guests".
