= Harry MacElhone =

Scottish bartender

Harry MacElhone (1890–1958) was a bartender, famous for his bar in Paris, Harry's New York Bar; his influential cocktail book, Harry's ABC of Mixing Cocktails; and for inventing or first publishing numerous classic cocktails.

== Career ==
MacElhone was born in Dundee, Scotland, on 16 June 1890. He began working at Ciro's Club in London after World War I, before moving to Paris and buying Harry's New York Bar in 1923. He later worked at the Plaza Hotel in New York.

As of 2022, his descendants continued to run Harry's New York Bar.

== Harry's ABC of Mixing Cocktails ==
MacElhone published a series of cocktail books, in various editions and printings, commonly known as Harry's ABC of Mixing Cocktails, beginning with Harry of Ciro's ABC of Mixing Cocktails in 1922, and ending with the twelfth version, the "New Edition" in 1952/53. Except for the last one, they were all from the interwar period (specifically 1922–1939). One book was published with a different title and somewhat different format, Barflies and Cocktails (1927), which corresponds to what would have been the seventh edition, having been published between the sixth edition and eighth editions. In fact, there was no ABC listed as a seventh edition, and prior to publication it was referred to as "the new edition of Harry's A.B.C. of Cocktails". Barflies and Cocktails had illustrations, a different publisher (Lecram Press, Paris), and a supplement about the bar's customers and their favored drinks, but the same main list of cocktails (with minor updates from the earlier book).

These books were very popular, feature the earliest known recipes of many important drinks, and provide a record of cocktail culture as it spread internationally in the interwar period, both during and immediately after Prohibition.

== Cocktails ==
Ciro's Club is also where he began working on his earliest version of the White Lady, which included gin, Crème de menthe, Triple sec and lemon juice.

He is often credited with inventing many other cocktails, including the Bloody Mary, the Sidecar, the Monkey Gland, the Paradise, the Boulevardier, and an early form of the French 75.

== See also ==
- List of bartenders
