= Harry's New York Bar =

Bar in Paris, France

Coordinates: 48.8692°N 2.3321°E

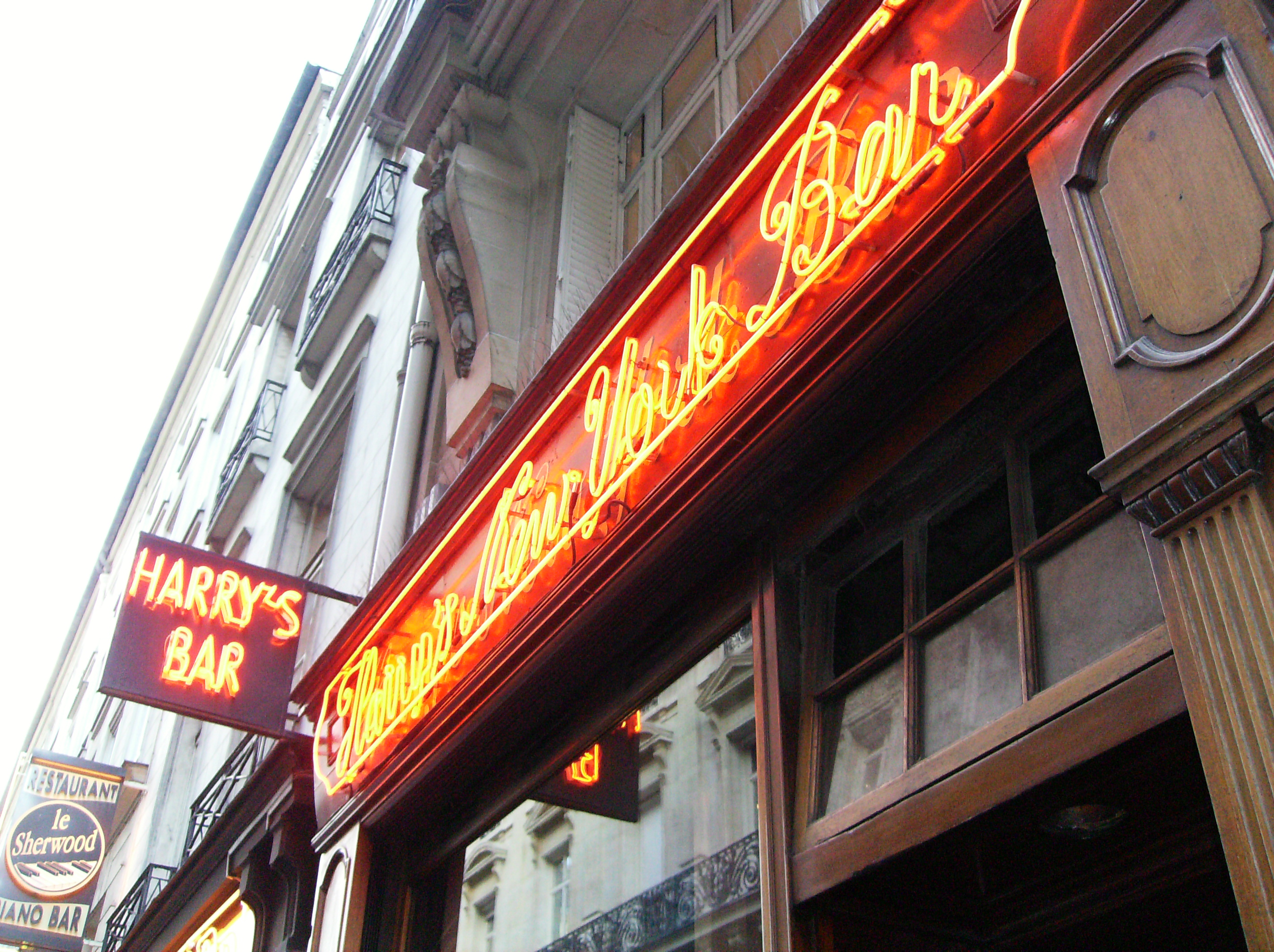
The Neon of Harry's New York Bar

Harry's New York Bar is a bar in Paris, France located at 5, Rue Daunou, between the Avenue de l'Opéra and the Rue de la Paix. It was converted from a bistro by jockey Tod Sloan in 1911 and became a popular expatriate spot during World War I. It has been frequented by a number of international celebrities and is said to be the birthplace of several classic cocktails.

== History ==
The bar was acquired by former American star jockey Tod Sloan in 1911, who converted it from a bistro and renamed it the "New York Bar." Sloan had entered into a partnership with a New Yorker named Clancy (first name unknown) who owned a bar in Manhattan. That bar was dismantled and shipped to Paris. Sloan then hired Harry MacElhone, a barman from Dundee, Scotland, to run the bar.

At the time, American tourists and members of international artistic and literary communities were travelling or moving to Paris in ever-increasing numbers, and Sloan hoped to capitalize on his fame and make the place a place where expatriates would feel at home. His bar was successful with members of the American Field Service Ambulance Corps during World War I. However, financial problems from Sloan's overspending on his lavish personal lifestyle forced him to sell the bar.

In 1923, MacElhone, its former barman, bought the bar and added his name to it. He would be responsible for making it into a legendary Parisian landmark. When Harry died, in 1958, his son Andrew took over the bar and ran it until 1989. His son in turn, Duncan, took over the bar and ran it until his death in 1998, when his widow, Isabelle MacElhone, took it over.

== Clientele ==
Over the years, Harry's New York Bar was frequented by a number of famous American expatriates and international celebrities such as Prince Serge Obolensky, Knute Rockne, Sinclair Lewis, Ernest Hemingway, Daft Punk, Bill Tilden, Coco Chanel, Jack Dempsey, Primo Carnera, Ramon Novarro, Aly Khan, Rita Hayworth, Humphrey Bogart, Brendan Behan (who worked there circa 1948–49 according to his memoirs Confessions of an Irish Rebel), and even, occasionally, the Duke of Windsor.

In the 1960 Ian Fleming short story "From a View to a Kill", James Bond recalls visiting Harry's Bar during his first visit to Paris at age 16. He followed the instructions in Harry's advertisement in the Continental Daily Mail, and told his taxi driver "Sank Roo Doe Noo". He recalls "That had started one of the memorable evenings of his life, culminating in the loss, almost simultaneous, of his virginity and his notecase".

In the first chapter of his novel Le Diable au corps Raymond Radiguet "gave the taxi driver the address of a bar in the rue Daunou" as Marthe "very much wanted to go to an American bar".

In his novel Le tour du Malheur, book 3, chapter VII, page 301, Joseph Kessel takes his characters to an American bar in rue Daunou. The action takes place in 1924.

== Other notable details ==
- Harry's conducts a straw poll before each US presidential election. Customers who provide proof of US citizenship can vote in the poll. The results have mirrored every election except those in 1976, 2004, and 2016 since the poll began in 1924.
- Harry's New York Bar is said to be the birthplace of classic cocktails such as the Bloody Mary, French 75, Sidecar and Monkey Gland.
- The "Ivories" Piano Bar at Harry's is where George Gershwin composed An American in Paris.
