= Toronto (cocktail) =

Mildly bitter cocktail

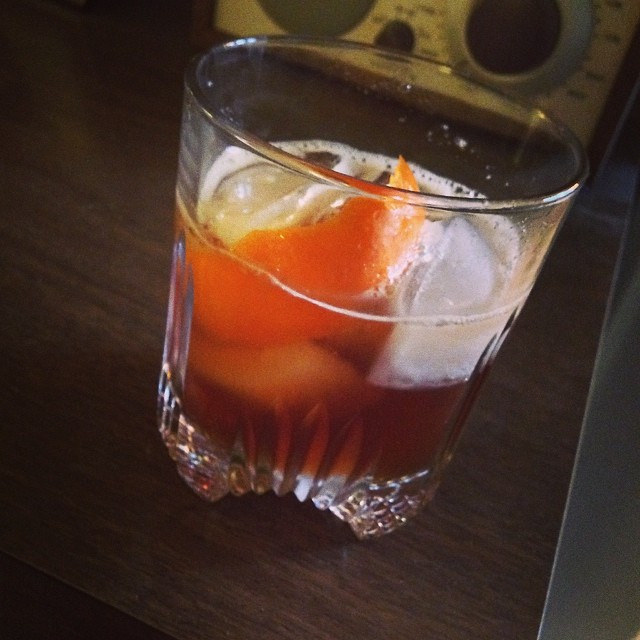
- Toronto cocktail served on the rocks
- Type: Cocktail
- Ingredients: 2 oz rye whisky; 1/4 oz Fernet-Branca; 1/4 tsp sugar; 1 dash angostura bitters
- Base spirit: Rye whiskey
- Standard drinkware: Cocktail glass
- Standard garnish: orange slice
- Served: Straight up: chilled, without ice

The Toronto is a dry, rich, and mildly bitter cocktail consisting of rye whisky, Fernet-Branca, angostura bitters, and either sugar or simple syrup. An article in Gizmodo by Brent Rose describes it as the "most popular legit cocktail that uses fernet". It is named after the Canadian city of Toronto.

== History ==
It was first recorded as the Fernet Cocktail in Robert Vermeire's 1922 edition of Cocktails: How to Mix Them, in which he stated that the "cocktail is much appreciated by the Canadians of Toronto". Because the importation of alcoholic beverages to Ontario was banned, as a result of the 1921 prohibition referendum, a reliable source for the Italian-made fernet would not have been readily available. It is unclear whether the Torontonians referenced by Vermeire obtained the drink in Toronto before prohibition, or at his bar in London, England.

By 1930, it was listed as the Toronto Cocktail in Cocktail Bill Boothby's World Drinks And How To Mix Them by William "Cocktail" Boothby. The recipes by Vermeire and Boothby both listed equal measures of rye whisky and Fernet-Branca. In 1948, it was listed as the Toronto Cocktail in the book The Fine Art of Mixing Drinks by David A. Embury, and in 1949 a recipe for the Toronto Cocktail was included in Esquire's Handbook for Hosts.

== Description ==
The Toronto Cocktail is a variation of the Old Fashioned, with the addition of Fernet-Branca.

Variations of the cocktail substitute various rye whiskeys as the primary ingredient, such as Canadian whisky or Old Overholt. The Fernet Cocktail recipe by Vermeire specified 1/4 gill (36 ml) of cognac or rye whisky, and 1/4 gill of Fernet-Branca.

The rye whisky complements the bitter Fernet-Branca and prevents it from dominating the cocktail. Sugar or simple syrup are used to reduce the cocktail's bitterness.

It may be served in a cocktail glass or coupe glass, and served with an orange slice or twist. It may also be served with ice in an old fashioned glass. It has a rich flavour with a mild bitterness.

== See also ==
- List of cocktails
