= Gancia (surname) =

Gancia is an Italian surname. Notable people with the name include:

- Carlo Gancia (wine), founder of the Gancia wine-producing company
- Carlo Vallarino Gancia, an Italo-Brazilian businessman
- Gianna Gancia, an Italian politician

== See also ==
- Gancia
- Gancia (disambiguation)
