= Boomerang (cocktail) =

Type of cocktail

- Type: Cocktail
- Ingredients: Rye Whiskey; Swedish Punsch; Dry Vermouth; Angostura bitters; Lemon juice
- Served: Stirred with ice

A Boomerang cocktail is a specific cocktail dating back to the early 20th century. In the 21st century, it may also be a reference to cocktails that bartenders illegally shuttle back and forth between bars as a way of sharing experimentation or building comradery.

== Boomerang as a specific cocktail ==
The Official Mixer's Manual lists the popularized version of the Boomerang Cocktail as calling for:

- 1/3 Rye Whiskey
- 1/3 Swedish Punsch
- 1/3 Dry Vermouth
- 1 dash Angostura bitters
- 1 dash lemon juice

To be stirred well with ice and strained into a glass.

The Cafe Royal Cocktail Book lists the same recipe. The Savoy Cocktail Book lists the same recipe, but calls for "Canadian Club whisky" instead of rye. The Standard Cocktail Guide employed rye whiskey but calls for different proportions, with 1 oz rye, 3/4 oz. swedish punsch, 3/4 oz. sweet vermouth, 2 dashes of lemon juice, and 1 dash of Angostura bitters.

Trader Vic lists the same recipe in his 1947 Bartender's Guide as was in the Official Mixer's Manual but substitutes the rye with bourbon. In the 1972 revised edition of the Bartender's Guide, Vic transformed the cocktail into something entirely different - white rum, pisco, gin, passion fruit nectar & lemon juice along with a dash of Angostura bitters.

Prior to World War II, the original Boomerang Cocktail was associated with a South African origin, and likely referred to the boomerang as used for hunting. The drink reached its zenith for a period of time after World War II, when the early Atomic Age and Space Age began to influence Las Vegas and popular culture in terms of architecture, furniture, fabrics, and style, including boomerang shaped cocktail tables, barware, and so-called "atomic cocktails". Flying-themed cocktail names were also popular during this time.

== Boomerang as a shuttled cocktail ==
A Boomerang cocktail may also refer to alcoholic drinks that bartenders send back and forth to each other from competing bars. It is considered a friendly gesture within the industry, but is typically illegal.

== In popular culture ==
The Boomerang cocktail was the featured drink for episode #14 of the pioneering video podcast Tiki Bar TV. In Charlotte Macleod's series of mysteries centered around Professor Peter Shandy at Balaclava Agricultural College in Massachusetts, the featured drink is the Balaclava Boomerang, which includes locally produced cherry brandy as an essential ingredient.

== See also ==
- Atomic cocktails
