= Modernista =

Modernista may refer to:

- Modernisme or Modernista, architecture style also known as Catalan Art Nouveau
- Modernista cocktail
