= Gancia (disambiguation) =

Gancia is an Italian wine-making company

Gancia may also refer to:

- Gancia (surname), Italian surname
- Santa Maria della Gancia, church in Palermo, Italy
