= Americano (cocktail) =

Cocktail composed of Campari, sweet vermouth, and club soda

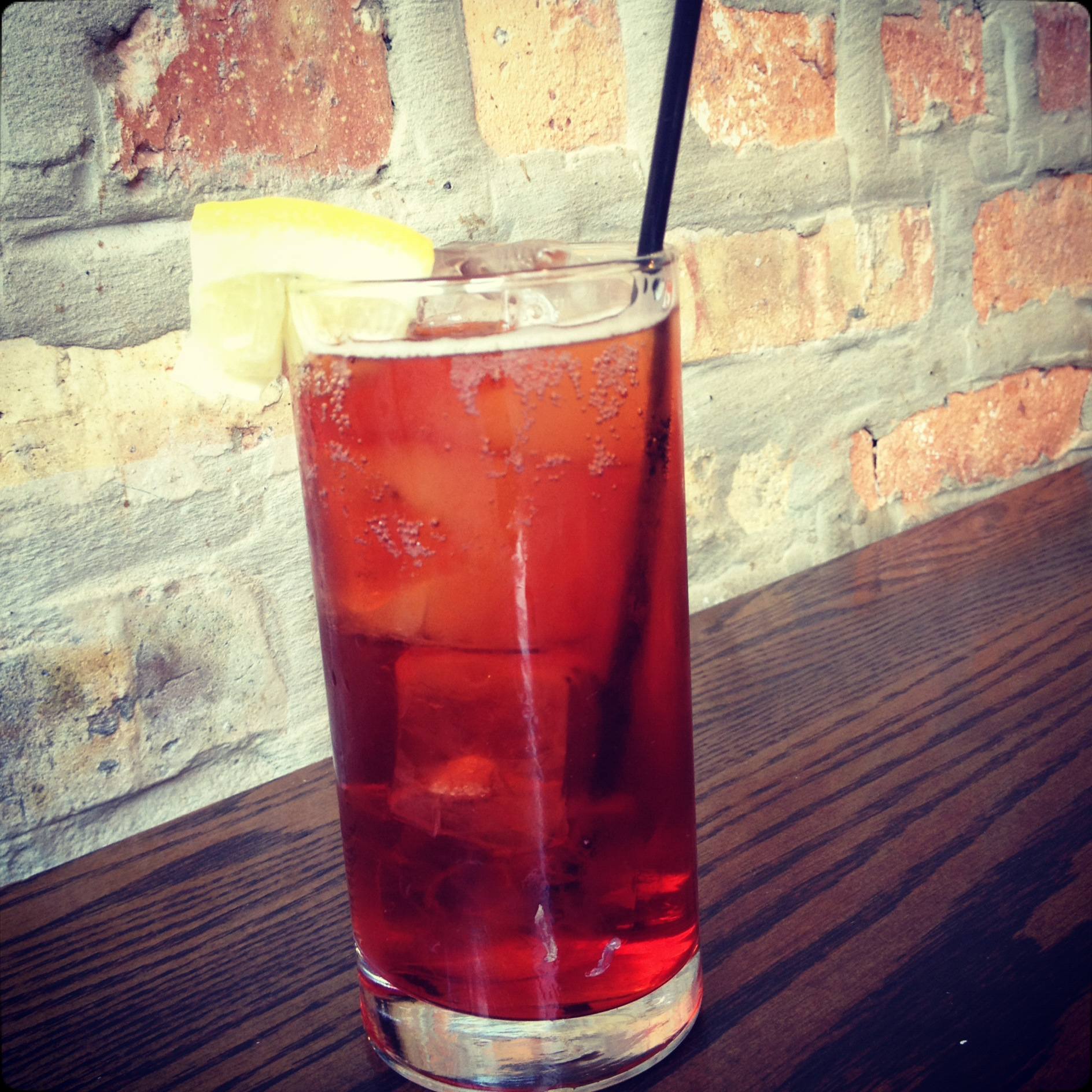
- Type: Mixed drink
- Ingredients: 3 cl Campari; 3 cl sweet red vermouth; A splash of soda water
- Standard drinkware: Old fashioned glass
- Standard garnish: Half an orange slice, lemon twist
- Served: On the rocks: poured over ice
- Preparation: Pour the Campari and vermouth over ice into an old-fashioned glass, add a splash of soda water and garnish with half an orange slice and a lemon twist.

The Americano is an IBA official cocktail composed of Campari, sweet vermouth and, for the sparkling version, club soda and garnished with a slice of lemon or an orange twist.

== History ==
The cocktail was first served in creator Gaspare Campari's bar, Caffè Campari in Milan. In the 1860s, an American man, who was under the impression that Campari was a long drink, ordered it, hated it, and said it would be better served iced and fizzy. He ordered a Campari and soda, which became too bitter; after a few iterations he and the esteemed bartender decided on Vermouth as the perfect blend. It is the direct descendant of the "Milano-Torino", which consisted of Campari, the bitter liqueur from Milan (Milano), and Punt e Mes, the vermouth from Turin (Torino), but lacked soda water. This drink was itself a descendant of the "Torino-Milano", a concoction consisting of equal parts Campari and Amaro Cora.

== In popular culture ==
It is the first drink ordered by James Bond in the first novel in Ian Fleming's series, Casino Royale. In From Russia With Love, Bond drinks "two excellent Americanos" in Rome during his flight to Istanbul. In the short story "From a View to a Kill", Bond chooses an Americano as an appropriate drink for a mere café; suggesting that "in cafés you have to drink the least offensive of the musical comedy drinks that go with them." Bond always stipulates Perrier, for, in his opinion, expensive soda water was the cheapest way to improve a poor drink.

In The Tourist, Elise and Fred, each had an Americano (or two) before their fancy dinner at a Venetian restaurant, and resumed drinking that post-dinner back in their hotel room. In The Talented Mr. Ripley, Tom and Dickie drink americanos on the Via Veneto in Rome.

Various twists on the classic Americano exists. Most commonly, the Guido Americano or Beericano replaces the club soda with beer. The beer can be frothed to create a salty foam to garnish the cocktail, or poured straight.

== See also ==
- List of cocktails
- List of IBA official cocktails
- Negroni
