= Antonio Benedetto Carpano =

Italian inventor

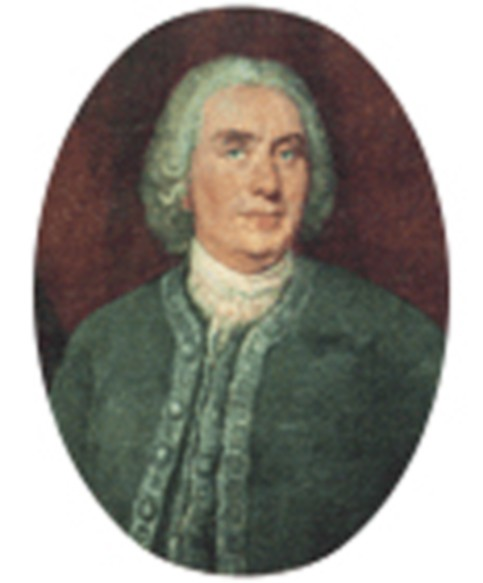
- Antonio Benedetto Carpano in a 19th century image

Antonio Benedetto Carpano (1764, Bioglio (Biella) – 1815, Turin) was an Italian distiller, famous for having invented vermouth and consequently the apéritif.

In 1786, Antonio Benedetto Carpano invented modern Vermouth in Turin, made from white wine added to an infusion of herbs and spices, in more than 30 varieties. It was sweetened with spirit, which he believed would be a more suitable beverage for ladies than the local red wines. Vermouth proved so popular that soon his shop was open 24 hours a day.

The Carpano brand is now produced and distributed by Fratelli Branca Distillerie of Milan, and includes: Carpano Classico Vermuth, Carpano Bianco, Carpano Antica Formula and the original aperitive "Punt e Mes".
