= Fernet-Branca =

Bitter, aromatic spirit from Italy

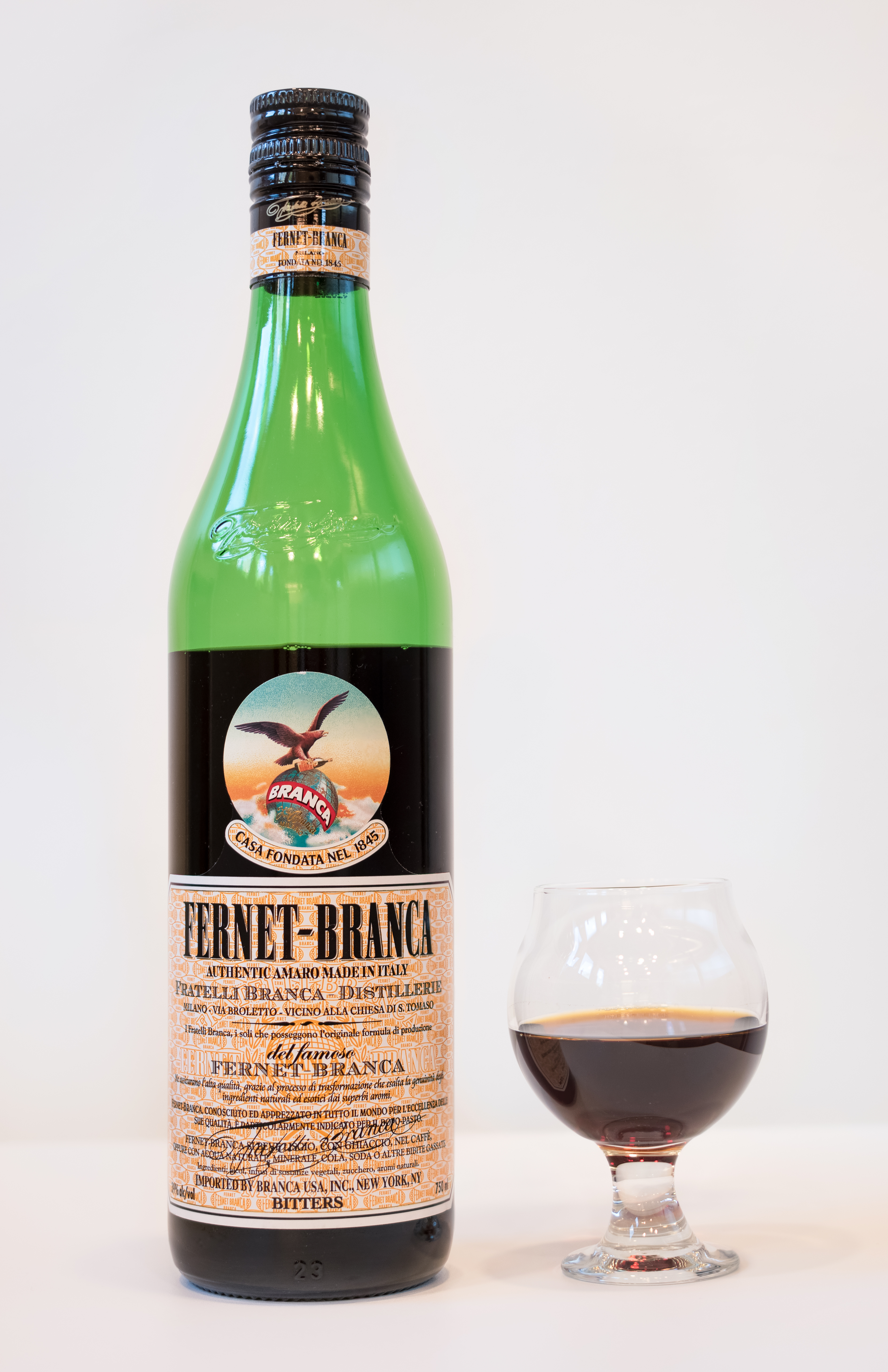
- Type: amaro or bitters (fernet)
- Manufacturer: Fratelli Branca Distillerie
- Origin: Milan, Italy
- Introduced: 1845
- Alcohol by volume: 39%
- Flavour: bitter
- Website: fernetbranca.com

Fernet-Branca (Italian: [ferˌnɛtˈbraŋka]) is an Italian brand of fernet, a style of amaro or bitters. It was formulated in Milan in 1845, and is manufactured there by Fratelli Branca Distillerie.

== History ==
Fernet-Branca was formulated in Milan, Italy, in 1845 by a self-taught herbalist, Bernardino Branca, who with his sons set up a business to manufacture and sell it. It was marketed as a pick-me-up and as a cure for worms, for fever, for cholera, and for menstrual pain. From 1886 the company published annual calendars with works by well-known artists. The eagle-and-globe logo was designed in 1893 by Leopoldo Metlicovitz.

The company began exporting to Argentina in 1907, and in 1925 established a distillery in Buenos Aires. In the United States the drink became popular after the passage of prohibition laws in 1919, as it was sold in pharmacies as a medicinal product. By 1936, Branca had set up a branch office in Tribeca, New York, to satisfy American demand. Production in the United States peaked at 60,000 cases in 1960.

== Formulation ==
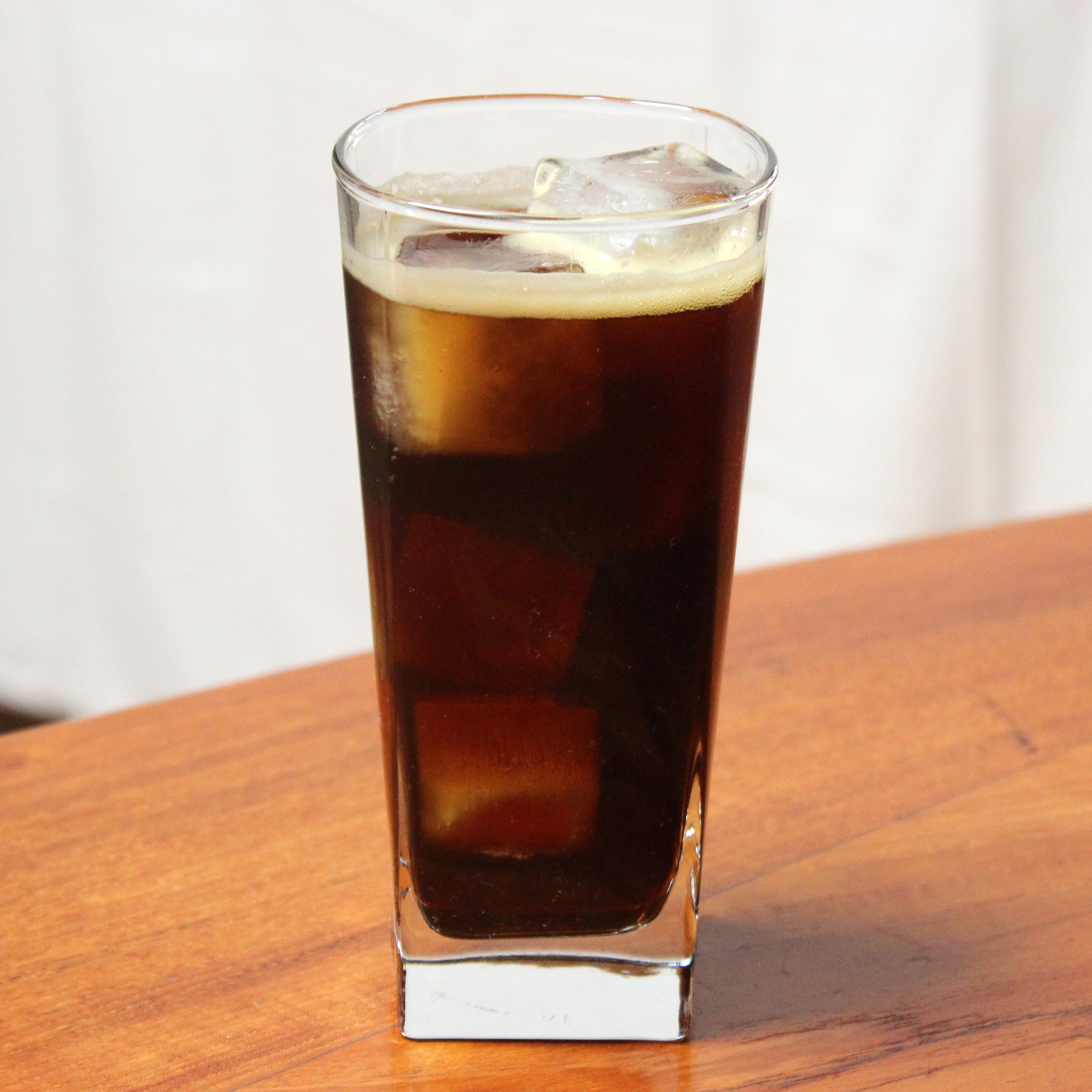
Fernet con coca, common in Argentina, and also spread to adjacent areas in Southern South America

Fernet-Branca is produced according to the original recipe of 1845. (Note: In the United States, after the Psychotropic Substances Act was passed in 1978, the recipe was changed in order to bring opiates down to legal levels.) It is made from 27 herbs and other ingredients; the exact formula is a trade secret. Sources have reported that its recipe includes Chinese rhubarb, Aloe ferox (bitter aloe), cinchona, chocolate, quinine, and angelica. According to the Branca website, the drink contains "... rhubarb from China, gentian from France, galanga from India or from Sri Lanka, (and) chamomile from Europe [or] Argentina", as well as linden (Tiliae flos), iris, saffron, zedoary, myrrh, and cinchona.

Fernet-Branca has a higher alcohol content, at 39%, and lower sugar content than most other amari. It is aged in oak barrels for a year.

The manufacturer also offers a sweeter, mint-flavoured liqueur, Branca Menta.

== Consumption ==
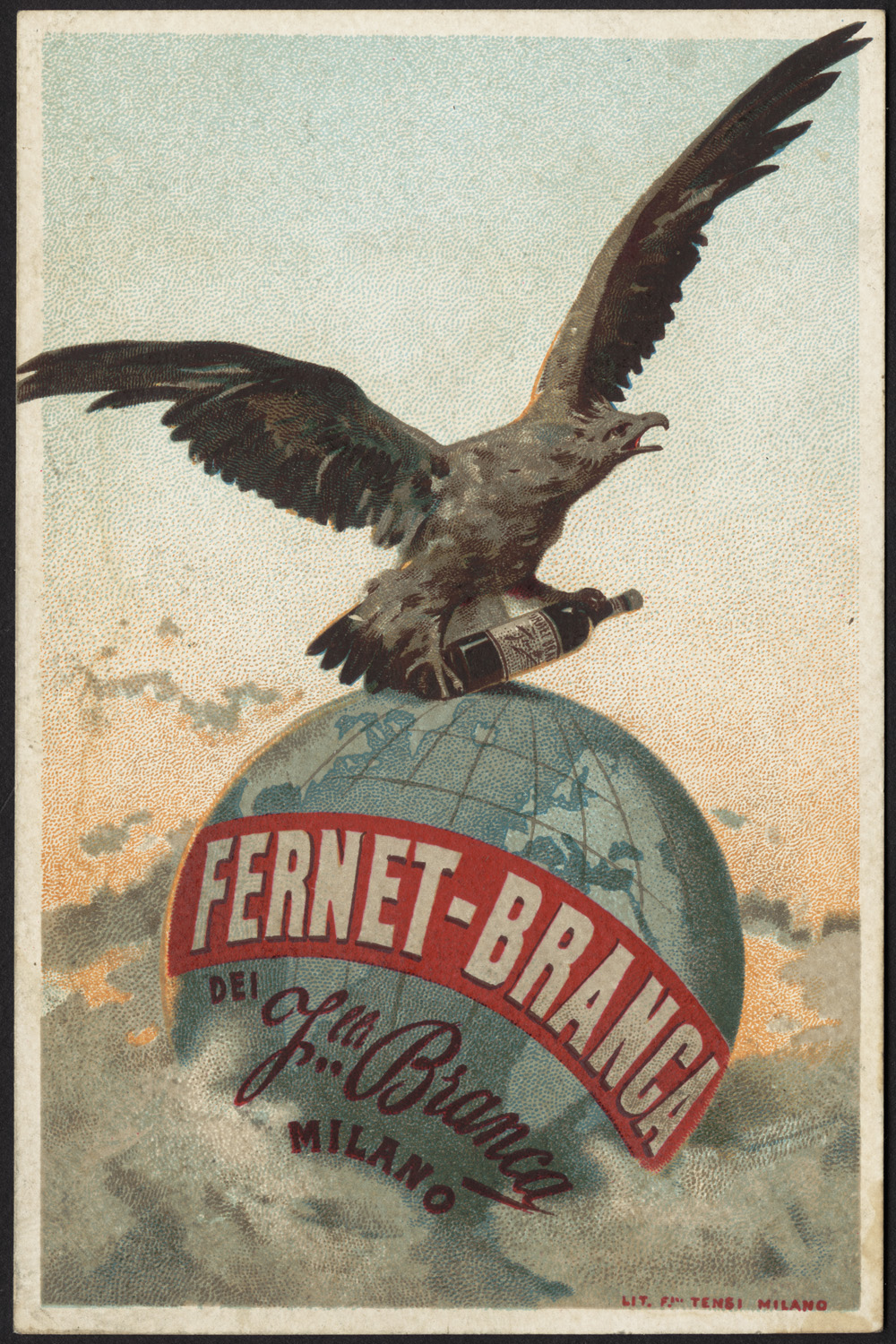
Fernet-Branca adv before 1900

Fernet-Branca is often consumed neat as a digestif, or as a mixing component (usually supportive and not as the primary ingredient) in cocktails such as the Toronto.

In Argentina fernet con coca – Fernet-Branca with Coca-Cola – is a popular drink. Some sources report that over 75% of all fernet produced worldwide is consumed there.

In the United States it has been referred to as "The Bartender's Handshake". It is estimated that 35% of all Fernet-Branca imported into the United States is consumed in San Francisco.

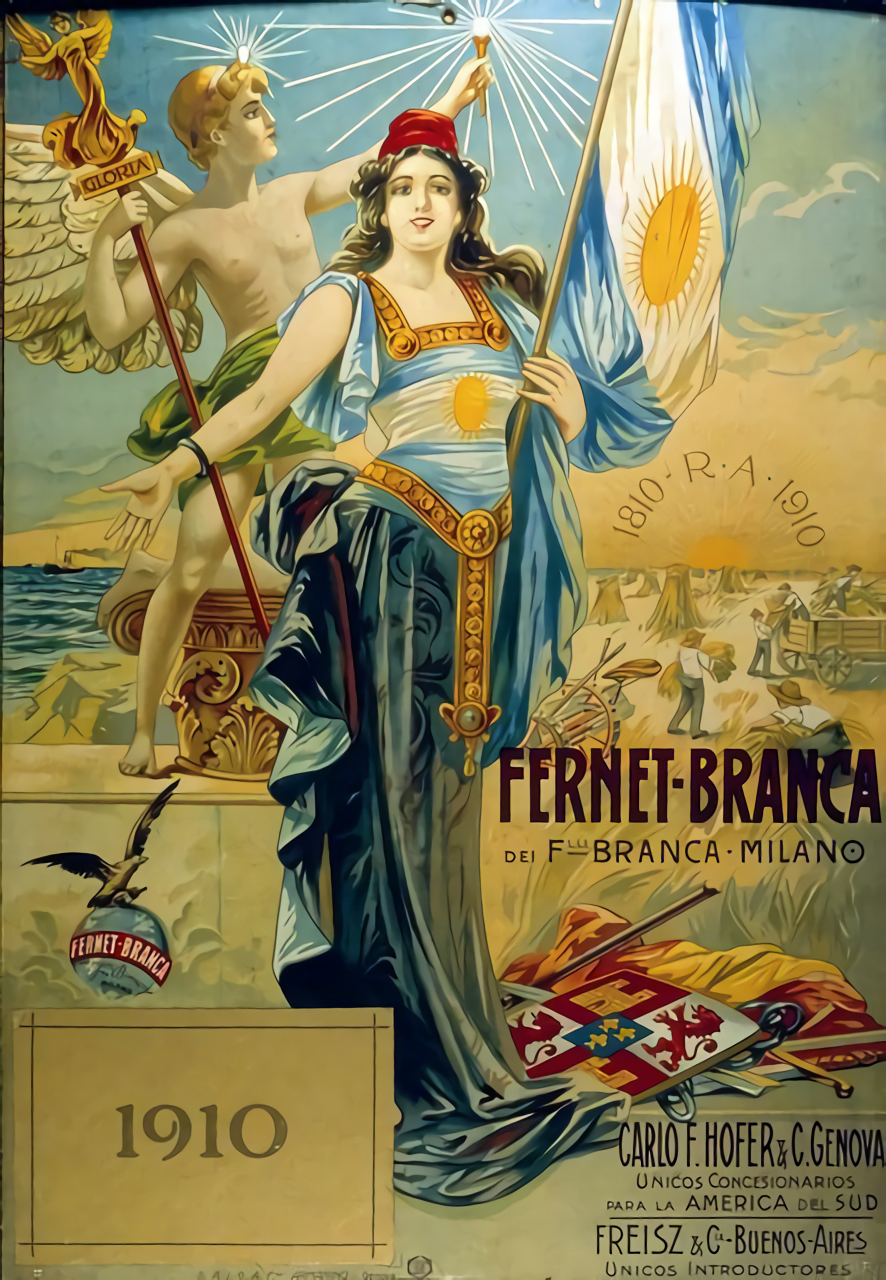
Advertisement for the Argentina Centennial, 1910
