= Punt e Mes =

Italian vermouth

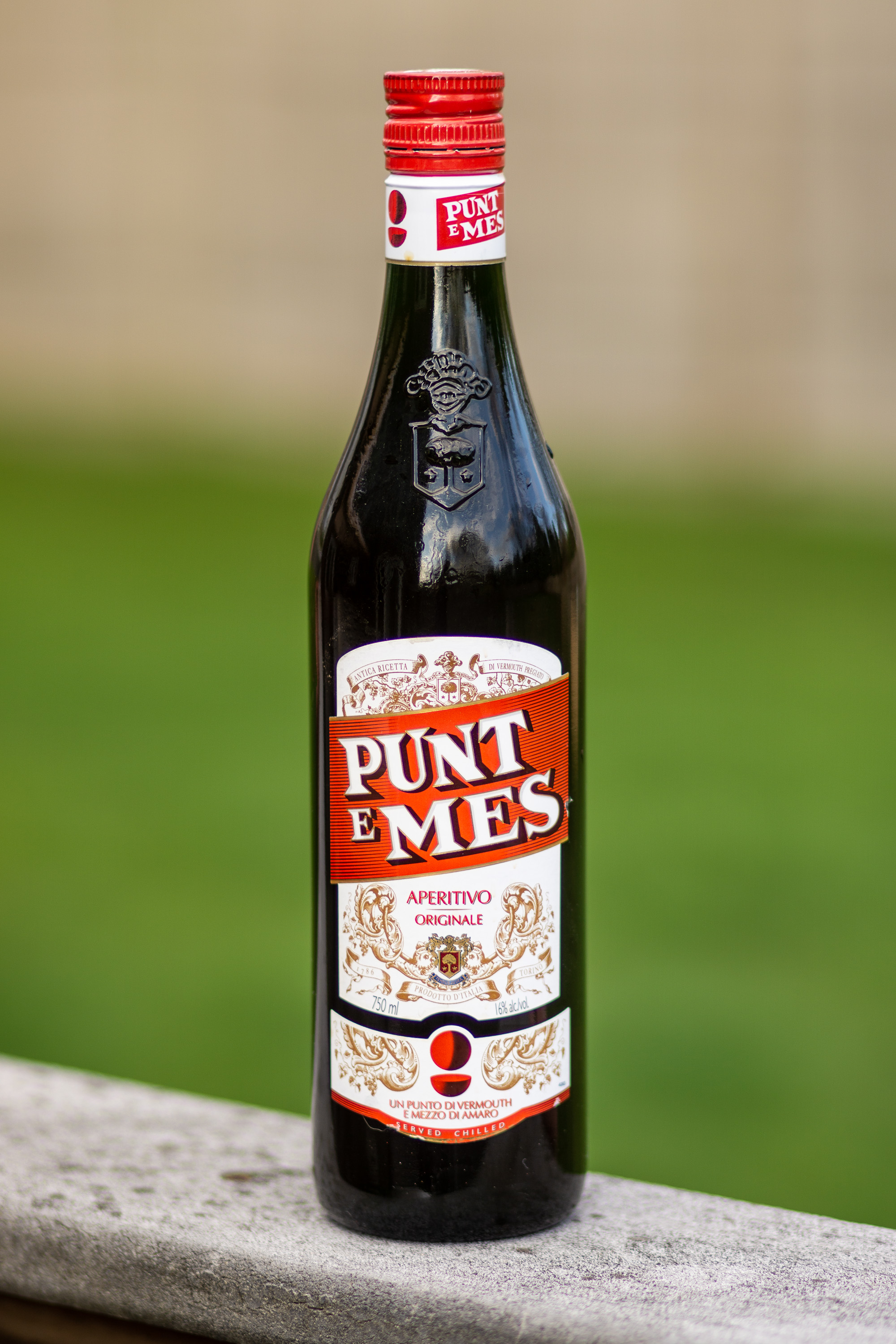
A bottle of Punt E Mes

Punt e Mes (from Piedmontese: pont e mes [ˈpʊŋt e ˈmez], "[one] point and a half") is an Italian vermouth. It is dark brown in color and has a bitter flavor. According to its producer, the name refers to the flavor being characterized as half a "point" of bitterness and one "point" of sweetness.

It can be used as a substitute for regular rosso vermouth in such drinks as the Americano, Manhattan, Negroni, and Boulevardier. Punt e Mes has a strong, distinctive flavor, half-way between regular rosso vermouth and Campari. Punt e Mes was made by the Carpano family from Turin until 2001, when Distillerie Fratelli Branca of Milan bought it.
