= Glögg =

Swedish mulled wine

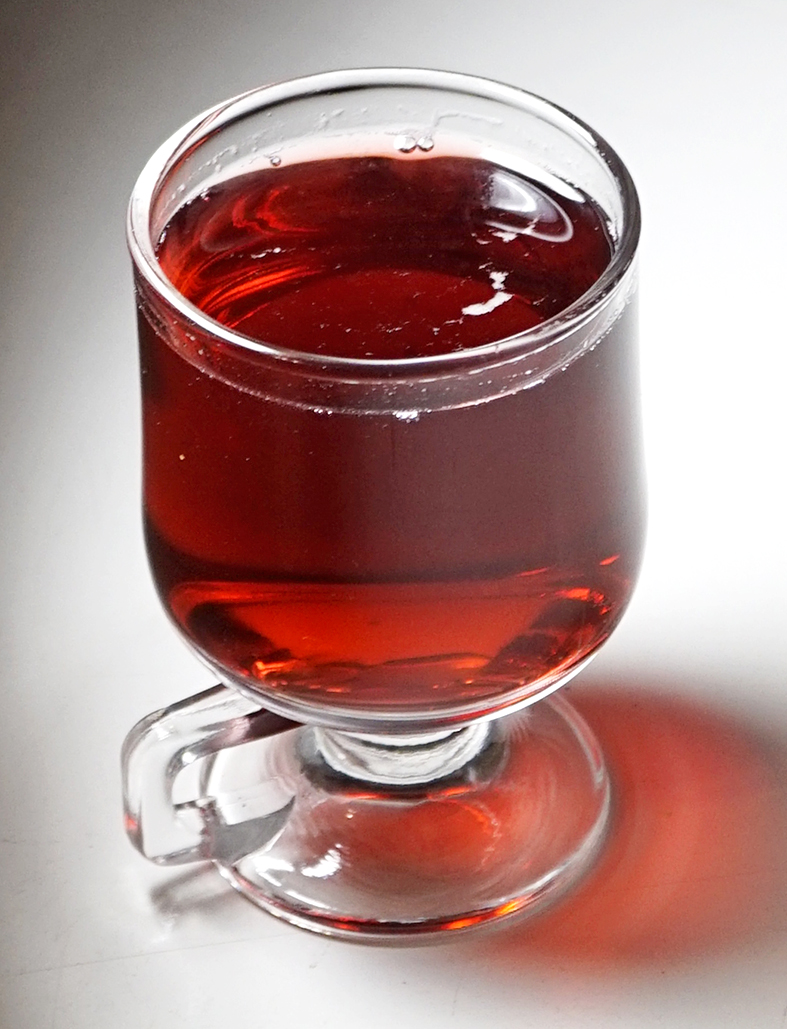
A glass of glögg

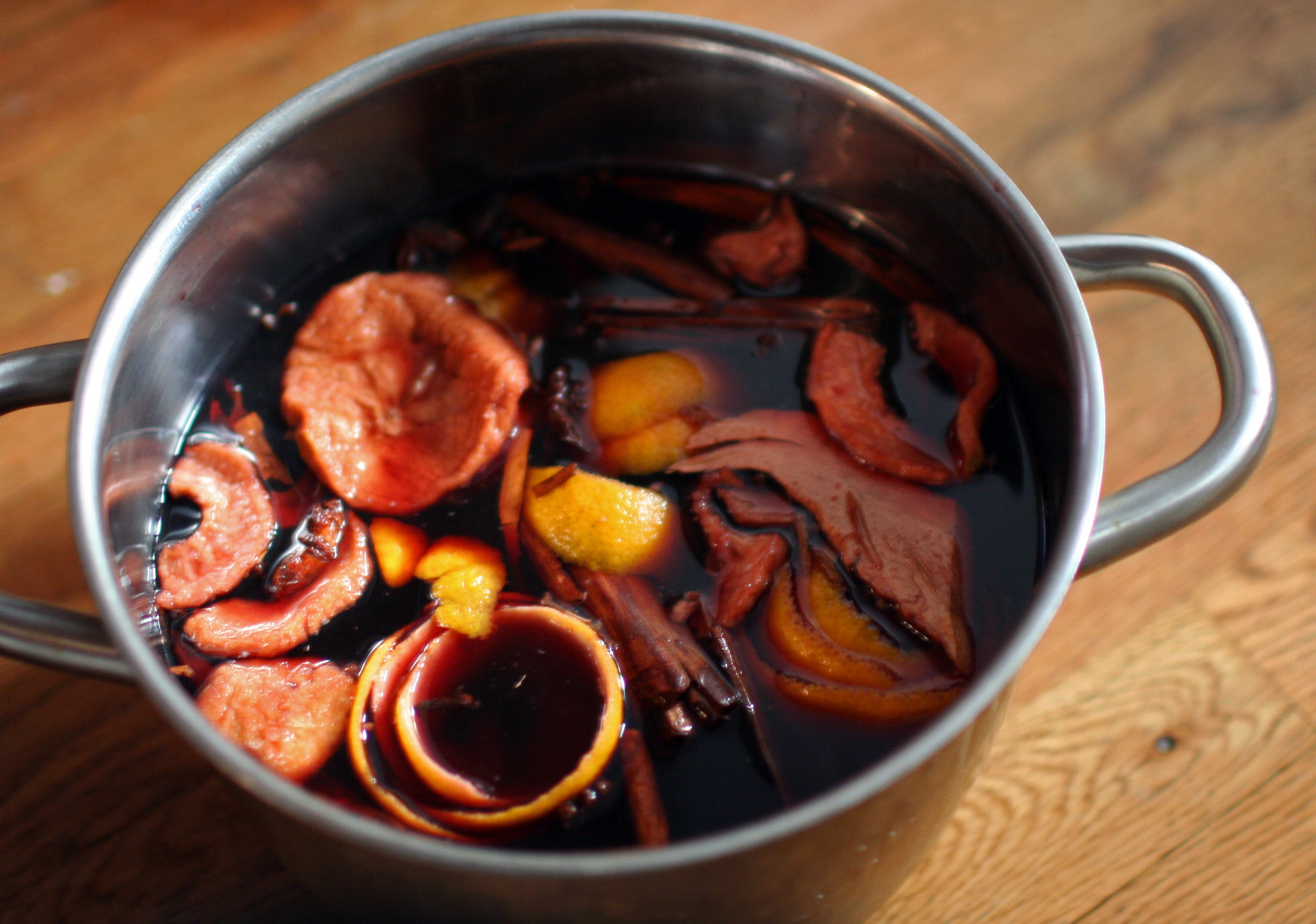
Glögg made with orange peel and spices

Glögg, gløgg or glögi (Note: Swedish and Icelandic: glögg (Icelandic pronunciation: [/klœkː/], Swedish pronunciation: [/ɡlœɡ/]); Danish, Faroese and Norwegian: gløgg (Danish pronunciation: [/ɡløɡ/], Norwegian pronunciation: [/ɡløɡ/]); Finnish and Estonian: glögi (Finnish pronunciation: [/ˈɡløɡi/], Estonian pronunciation: [/ˈɡ̊løɡ̊i/])) is a spiced, often alcoholic, mulled wine, or spirit of Swedish origin. It is a traditional Nordic drink during winter, especially around Christmas.

== History ==
In the Nordic countries, hot wine has been a common drink since at least the 16th century. The original form of glögg, a spiced liquor, was consumed by messengers and postmen who travelled on horseback or skis in cold weather. Since the early 19th century, glögg has been a common winter drink, mixed and warmed with juice, syrup, and sometimes with a smaller quantity of harder spirits or punsch.

Glögg came to Finland from Sweden at the end of 19th century. The Finnish word glögi comes from the Swedish word glögg, which in turn comes from the words glödgat vin or hot wine. Due to prohibition, consumption of glögg almost stopped completely. When prohibition was lifted in the 1930s glögg was advertised in Fenno-Swedish magazines, and in the 1950s and 60s, the drinking of glögg was a Fenno-Swedish tradition. At the end of the 1960s and beginning of the 1970s, glögg recipes began to also appear in Finnish-language magazines, after which glögg became a Christmas tradition in the whole of Finland.

While mulled wine (hõõgvein) was long known and popular in Estonia, Swedish-style glögg (glögi in Estonian) spread into Estonia only in the 1980s and 1990s, mostly via Finland, and local commercial production of glögi started in Estonia in 1995.

== Traditions ==
Glögg is a traditional Swedish drink during winter, especially around Christmas. Drinking glögg around Christmas became a tradition in the 19th century. Homemade glögg was common, and wine dealers offered their unique blends which were typically marketed with fanciful labels with tomte motifs. Since the 20th century glögg is traditionally served with almonds, raisins, gingerbread biscuits and saffron buns. In 2021, around 2.9 million litres of glögg were sold at Systembolaget. Currently, the largest glögg factory in the Nordic countries is located in Rajamäki, Nurmijärvi, Finland.

== Recipes ==
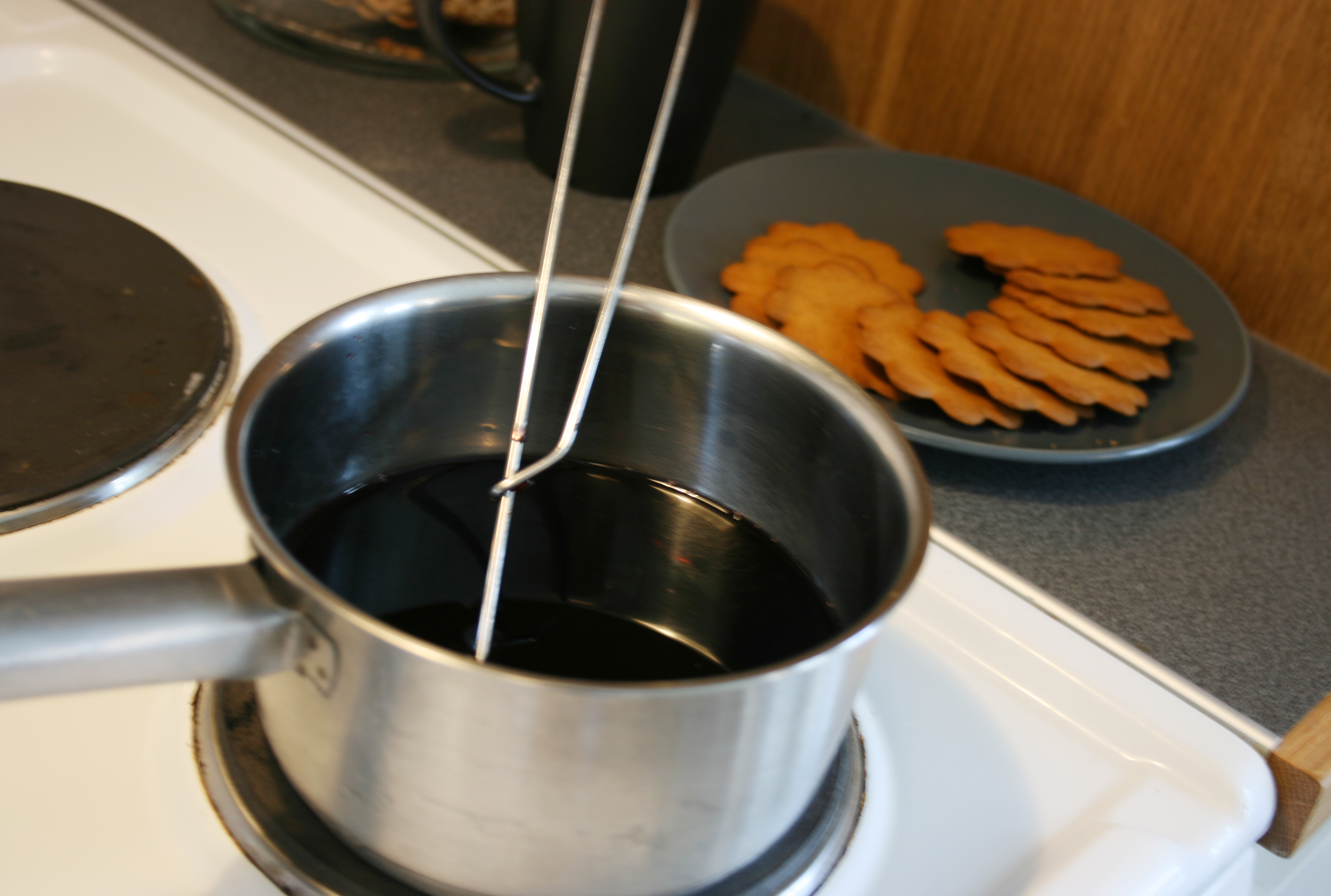
Glögg being warmed up

Glögg recipes vary widely; variations commonly start with white or sweet wine or spirits such as brandy or cognac. The production of glögg begins by boiling water and adding spices to it. After a few minutes of simmering, the mixture is sieved and fruit juice, wine or clear spirits are added. Other versions begin by warming up the wine, alcohol, and sugar (not boiling it) and letting the spices steep in it overnight. The most common spices in glögg are cloves, cinnamon, cardamom and ginger. Other common ingredients can include citrus peel from oranges or lemons, raisins, or almonds.

Glögg can also be made without alcohol by replacing the wine with fruit or berry juices. Ready-made glögg is usually based on grape juice, sometimes also blackcurrant juice, mixed fruit juice, apple juice or wine. There are also stronger, rum-based types of glögg. All glögg is warmed up before use, but if it is wine-based or high in alcohol content, it should not be heated to boiling point. It is common to add whole almonds or raisins to glögg while it is being warmed up or just before drinking.

== See also ==
- Grog
- Mulled wine
