= Fernet con coca =

Argentine cocktail made of fernet and cola

Fernandito
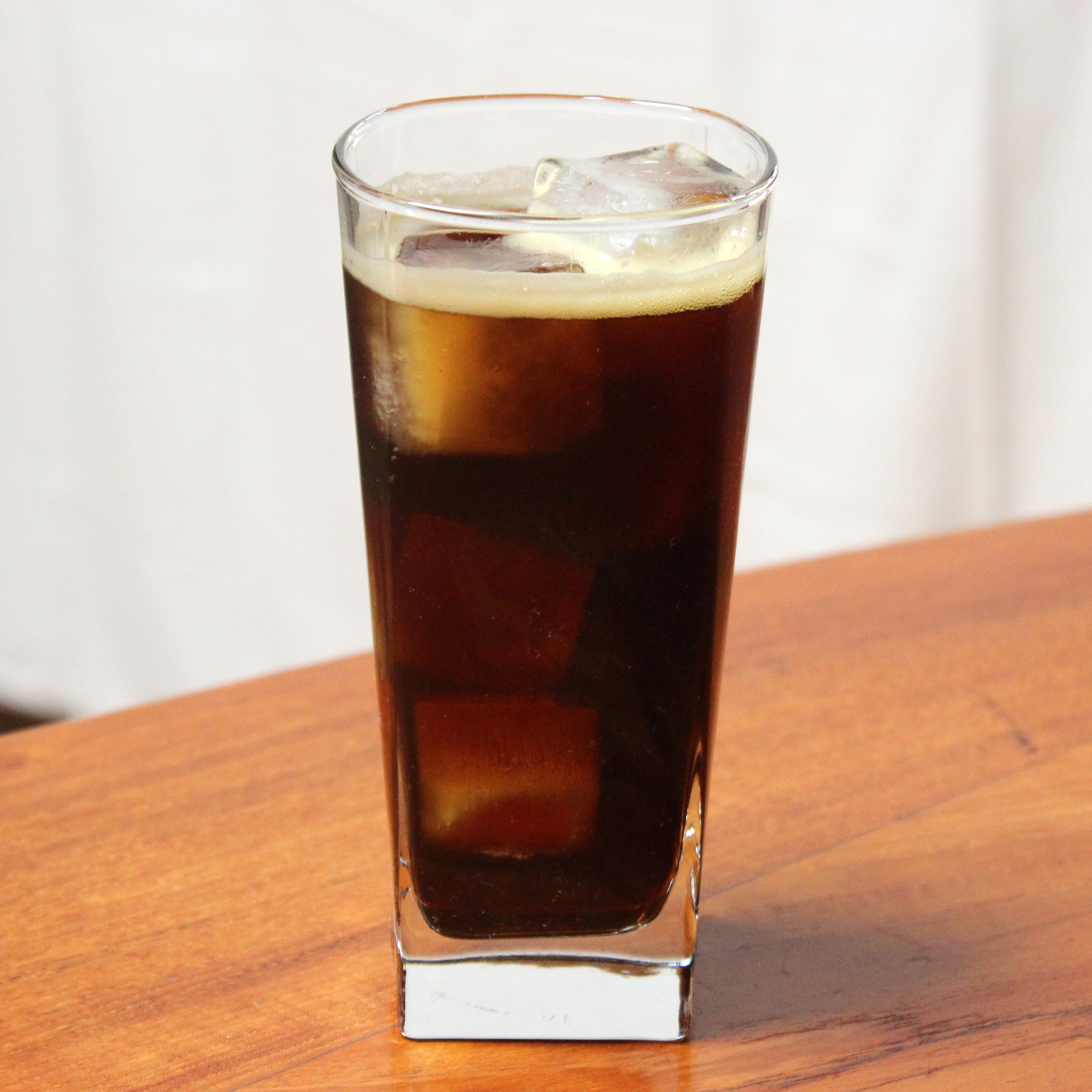
- A typical fernet con coca from Argentina, and also spread to adjacent areas in Southern South America
- Type: Highball
- Ingredients: 5 cl Fernet-Branca; Cola to top up
- Base spirit: Fernet-Branca
- Standard drinkware: Old fashioned glass
- Served: On the rocks: poured over ice

Fernet con coca (Spanish: [feɾˈne(ð) koŋ ˈkoka], "Fernet and Coke"), also known as fernando, its diminutive fernandito (Spanish: [feɾnanˈdito]), or several other nicknames, (Note: The cocktail is also known as fernuco, fernacho, fefi, chabona, morocho, ferloncho, the portmanteau fercola, 70/30, Bladis, and Fernando Bladis—in reference to a cuarteto singer.) is a long drink of Argentine origin consisting of the Italian amaro liqueur fernet and cola, served over ice. Although typically made with Fernet-Branca and Coca-Cola, several amaro brands have appeared in Argentina since its popularization, as well as ready-to-drink versions.

The cocktail first became popular among the youth of the college town of Córdoba, in the 1980s and—impulsed by an advertising campaign led by Fratelli Branca—its consumption grew in popularity during the following decades to become widespread throughout the country, surpassed only by that of beer and wine. It is now considered a cultural icon of Argentina and is especially associated with its home province Córdoba, where the drink is most consumed. The drink is so popular in Argentina that the nation consumes more than 75% of all fernet produced. The cocktail can also be found in some of its bordering countries, such as Uruguay.

In 2020, fernet con coca became the first Argentine drink to be recognized as an IBA official cocktail, listed under the name fernandito in the "new era drinks" category.

== History ==
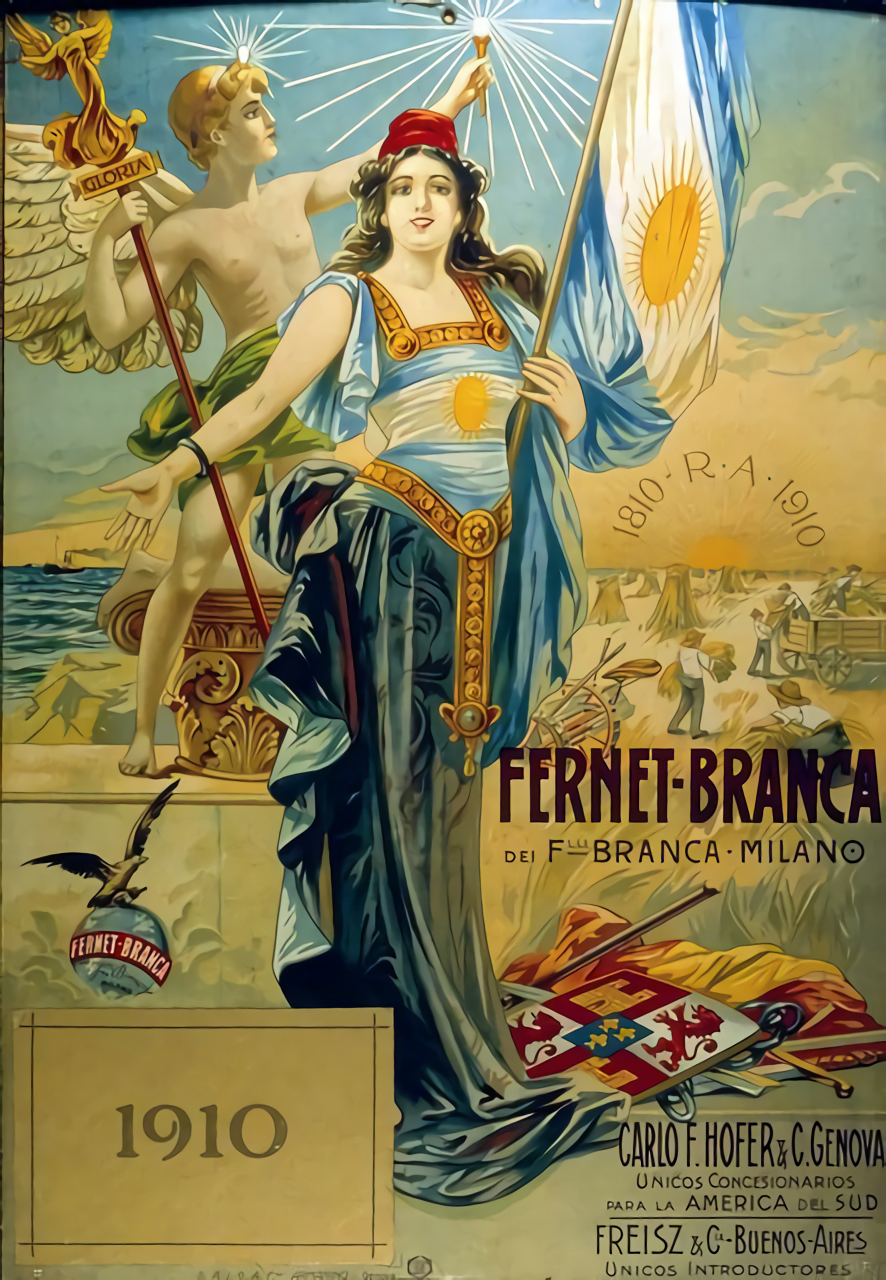
Fernet-Branca advertisement from 1910, depicting an allegorical representation of Argentina, in honor of the Centennial celebrations

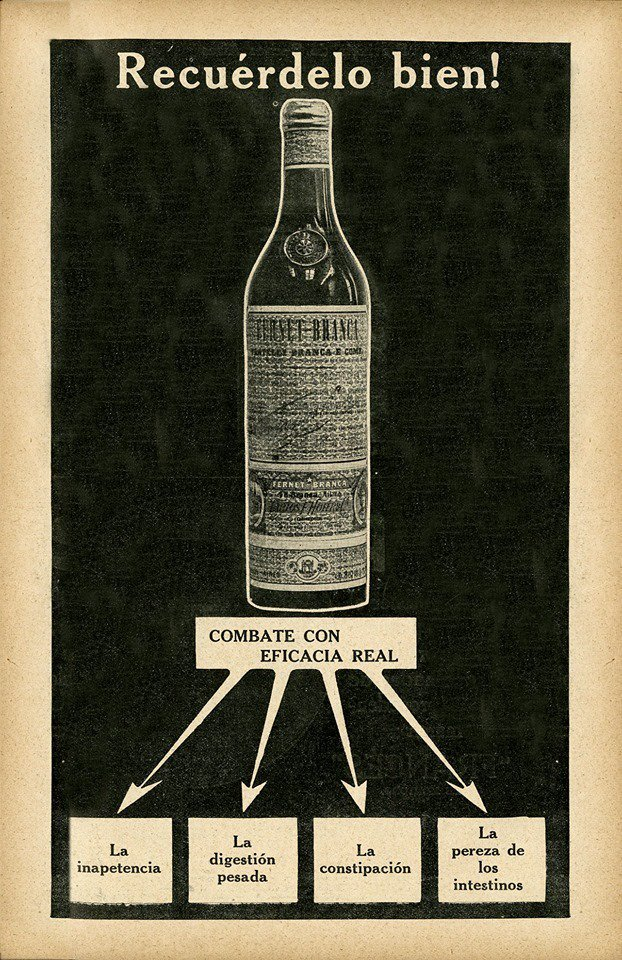
Fernet-Branca advertisement published in magazine Caras y Caretas in 1915, promoting its digestive benefits

Fernet was introduced to Argentina by Italians during the great European immigration wave to the country of the late 19th and early 20th centuries, a period in Argentine history characterized by vast economic growth and rapid social change. The popularity of fernet in Argentina is representative of the lasting influence Italian immigrants had in the broader consumer tastes and culture of the country. Over many years, fernet consumption expanded in an unprecedented way throughout the Argentine territory, although this process is still "confusing and poorly documented". In 1941, Fratelli Branca opened its first and only production plant outside Italy in the Buenos Aires neighborhood of Parque Patricios, which indicates that already at that time the fernet market in Argentina was considerable. Another underground plant was opened in 1982 in Tortuguitas, Greater Buenos Aires. Before the combination with cola became widely popular in the 1990s and 2000s, fernet was traditionally consumed in the country as an apéritif and digestif, and was either drunk as an after-dinner shot, mixed with soda water or as part of a carajillo de fernet, in which some dashes of the bitter are added to a cup of coffee.

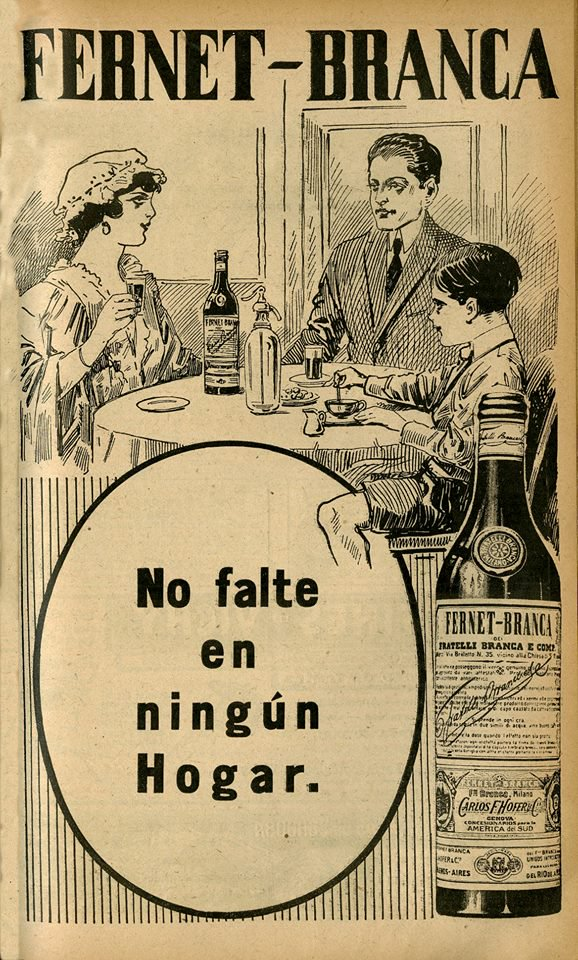
Fernet-Branca advertisement published in the magazine Caras y Caretas in 1920, showing a family having soda water and fernet, representing the bitter as a staple in home life. The text means "should not be missing from any home."

Although the exact origin of the cocktail is poorly-documented and "somewhat shrouded in mythmaking", it is generally agreed that it originated in Córdoba Province, and is heavily associated with its capital of the same name, Argentina's second most populous city. Some sources say that the cocktail already existed in the 1950s, as a "gentler" variation of the common combination of fernet and soda water, while others affirm that it was invented in the 1970s by Oscar "el Negro" Becerra, a drummer and bartender from Cruz del Eje, a city in the province's northwest. Another version suggests the drink was invented in Argentina's northern provinces. Fernet con coca began to grow in popularity in Córdoba city during the 1980s, in the period that followed Argentina's return to democracy. Although "theories swirl about who sparked fernet's explosion", most point to the city's large population of university students. By the end of the decade, Fratelli Branca's marketing director noticed the drink's growing popularity in Córdoba and launched a series of national advertising campaigns actively encouraging the combination with Coca-Cola, at first in an "implicit" agreement with The Coca-Cola Company and, between 1994 and 1997, as an official co-branding campaign. Fratelli Branca head of marketing since 1992 Hernán Mutti told Fortune in 2016: "We had to convince Argentina that this was the way to drink fernet: to be shared between friends. It was being drunk behind closed doors; it wasn't a friendly product." The company then "did everything to get people to try fernet and cola on any occasion", promoting the drink with samplings at bars and events and in popular seaside towns along the coastline of the Atlantic, targeting people under the age of 25. The tastings were accompanied by advertising connecting Fernet-Branca to distinctive national landscapes, such as Patagonia's Perito Moreno glacier. The campaign is considered one of the most successful marketing strategies in the country's recent history, as it managed to "capture a still incipient consumption in a specific place in the country to popularize it and impose it in the daily life of Argentines."

[The myth of fernet con coca's popularization], at the end of the 20th century, works as an inversion of the civilizing flow the Argentine state had consolidated a century before: the dark and quarrelsome mix of Italian liquor and soda made its way from the periphery to the center and prevailed. And with it, an emotional economy of ethyl pleasure was also imposed, which harmonized with the end of the period and replaced the Menemist champagne (Note: The oxymoronic phrase "pizza and champagne" (Spanish: pizza con champagne) is a common icon and metaphor of the Argentine 1990s, as its combination of high and low culture represents the "frivolous" splurging spirit of the era, as well as the phenomenon of consumption and revaluation of working class practices and aesthetics by the upper classes during the era of Menem's neoliberal policies and convertibility plan.) with the post-convertibility fernet.

— Diego Vecino, Brando, 2011.

In addition to the effective advertising campaign, the popularity of the drink has been linked to other coinciding phenomena: the diversification of the Argentine market for alcoholic beverages and the modernization of cuarteto, a style of popular music from Córdoba that expanded to Buenos Aires during the 1980s and 1990s, spearheaded by singer Rodrigo's success. Furthermore, between 1990 and 2010 the habits of Argentines were transformed as a result of a tumultuous political and economic life, with BBC Mundo's Daniel Pardo writing: "First came the splurge, opulence, and cheap dollar of Carlos Menem's presidency, then a terrible economic crisis in 2001 that triggered poverty, and then three left-wing governments that, in the midst of an export boom, enriched (or subsidized) the poor." Branca brand ambassador Nicola Olianas told the Spirits Business in 2017 that he "has obviously contemplated how to replicate the success in other markets, but wonders whether the conditions in Argentina were somehow unique, with the long-established distillery and the millions of emigré Italians". By the year 2000, consumption had already consolidated in cities such as Tucumán, Mendoza and Buenos Aires, and continued to grow despite the economic crisis of 2001. On the contrary, since 2002 fernet's production and marketing underwent intense transformations, establishing itself as "one of the most striking phenomena in the entire region", making way for women and young people as new consumers and cementing its popularity at bars, parties, asados and gatherings. In Buenos Aires alone, the drink's sales grew by 115% between 2001 and 2008. By 2012, 40 million liters of fernet were produced per year, twice as much as in 2007. According to a 2011 governmental report, fernet consumption in Argentina grew 251% during the 2000s, far ahead of beer's 60%. Another study reported that during the period of Néstor Kirchner and Cristina Fernández de Kirchner's presidencies—between 2004 and 2015—fernet consumption increased 405%, noting that "the kirchnerist decade could also be called 'the fernet decade'." Fernet production in Argentina has been falling consistently since 2015, as part of a widespread economic downturn that began during Mauricio Macri's presidency. Between 2015 and 2019, the Argentine production of fernet and bitters fell from 56.4 to 44.3 million annual liters.

== Preparation ==
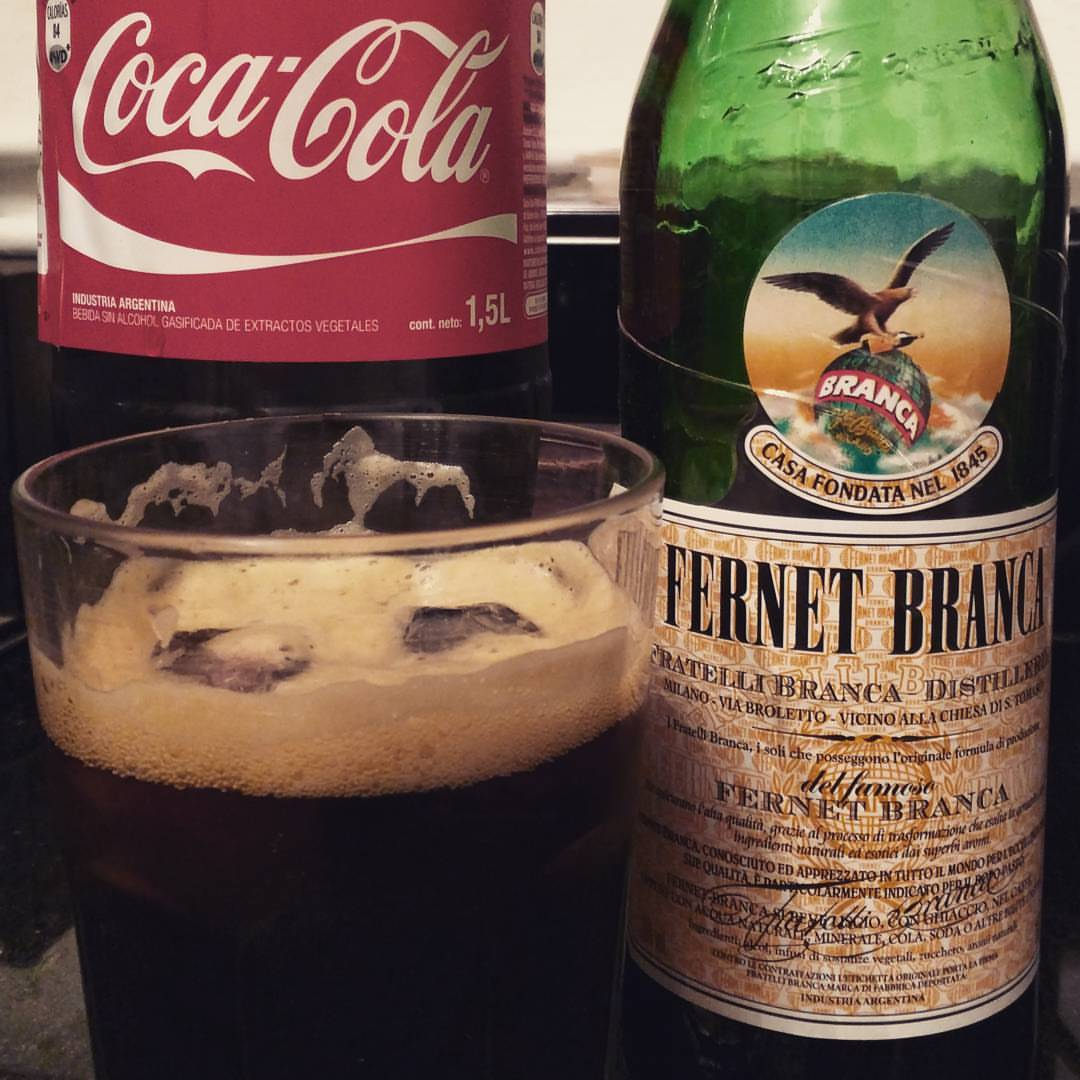
Fernet con coca is a simple, two-ingredient cocktail known for its gold-tinted foam and bittersweet taste.

Fernet con coca is a long drink, usually served in a tall tumbler such as the highball. Simple in composition, the two-ingredient cocktail comprises just its eponymous ingredients and ice. The result is a black concoction with a "velvety", gold-tinted foam, and a complex and bittersweet taste that features competing and complementary flavors. The exact proportions of each ingredient are debated, and people prepare the cocktail according to personal taste. A popular measurement is three parts fernet and seven parts cola. An early Cordoban version of the drink called "90210"—a possible reference to the 1990s TV drama— calls for nine-tenths of fernet, two ice cubes and one tenth of cola. The International Bartenders Association recipe—first published in 2020—calls for 50 millilitres Fernet-Branca poured into a double old fashioned glass with ice, filled up with cola.

Fernet-Branca and Coca-Cola are by far the preferred brands and market leaders, although several other local bitters have emerged since the drink's popularization, which include "premium" and cheaper versions, as well as "artisan-made" fernets, and ready-to-drink versions of the cocktail. Over the years, fernet products in Argentina have been "lightened" in relation to the traditional amari of Italy, as they are now intended for consumption with cola—reducing their bitterness, alcohol content and "syrupy texture".

La Voz explained a typical preparation of fernet con coca: "It carries two or three ice cubes and a variable measure of fernet and cola. It is recommended to serve it with an inclination of 45 degrees and in a long glass so that the soda does not lose gas. The foam should expand to overflow the glass and then contract and stay within the circumference of the glass. On the contrary, if it drips between the sides, the soda was served too quickly and the drink will lose its character, its perfect condition." Some people dump an extra measure of fernet just as the foam is about to leak out of the glass, so that it lowers and does not spill, a practice known as coronado (meaning 'crowned'). Walkers commonly make a viajero (meaning 'traveller' in Spanish), using half-cut plastic bottles of Coca-Cola as containers for communal drinking and to carry the cocktail.

== Popularity ==
raw data
The exponential growth in production the Argentine fernet industry experienced from 1990 to 2015, measured in millions of liters produced

Despite being a relatively modern phenomenon, fernet con coca has managed to cement itself culturally, and is now regarded as a national symbol and cultural icon of Argentina, as well as the country's "unofficial national drink".

It is mostly consumed in Argentina, but the cocktail can also be found in some of its neighboring countries, such as Uruguay and Bolivia. Despite its popularity, many Argentines consider fernet con coca to be an acquired taste, and its flavor often repulses foreigners. Some relate the success of the cocktail in the country to a general fondness for the bitter taste in Argentine culture, exemplified by the widespread consumption of maté and non-alcoholic bitters such as Terma.

Fernet's popularity extends beyond differences in age, sex or social class, and currently is the third most popular alcoholic beverage in the country, behind wine and beer.

The popularity of the cocktail has made Argentina the consumer of 75% of all fernet produced globally, as well as one of the world's highest Coca-Cola consumers, drinking about four times the global average.

With its long history in the country, the Fernet-Branca brand has achieved a "cultlike" and "almost mythical" status among Argentines. It is by far the most popular fernet brand sold in Argentina, having 79% of the market share, followed by Vittone with 11%, Capri with 7% and 1882 (known as "milocho") with 3%. According to Branca, only 5% of fernet sold in Argentina is drunk on its own, and the rest is used for mixing, largely with cola.

Fernet con coca has been used as a novelty flavoring in ice cream, and alfajores, a local confection. Some companies sell canned "fernet con coca foam" that can be used as a dessert topping or filling.

Three-quarters of the amaro's sales are concentrated in "the Interior" provinces, that is, the portion of the Argentine territory that is not part of the Buenos Aires metropolitan area. Fernet consumption per capita increases between 15% and 18% in the Northwest, which includes the provinces of Jujuy, Salta, Tucumán, Catamarca, La Rioja and Santiago del Estero, as the region has a greater historical tradition of herbal liqueur drinking. However, the epicenter of fernet con coca drinking in the country is its home province of Córdoba, which represented almost 30% of national consumption—about three million liters of fernet a year—in 2013. The drink is considered an "emblem" of the province, and a fundamental part of its distinct cultural identity and heritage. Córdoba prides itself on setting its own cultural trends, and fernet con coca has become one of its biggest icons along with rallying and cuarteto music. The popularity of fernet among Cordobans has been linked to the local custom of consuming herbal medicines such as burro, boldo and peperina. Writing for The New York Times in 2015, Jonathan Gilbert felt that the preference for fernet in Córdoba "demonstrates the extent to which [its inhabitants] revolt against the prevailing cultural and political trends in Buenos Aires, whose inhabitants are called porteños".

== In popular culture ==
Several recording artists, especially from Córdoba, have made reference to the cocktail in their works. In the 1990s, rock band Vilma Palma e Vampiros from Rosario released a song named after the cocktail, which featured the lyrics: "I do not want to end up in a cell without my fernet con coca". Fito Páez names the drink in his song "Las cosas que me hacen bien", off his 2020 album La conquista del espacio.

== See also ==
- Argentine cuisine
- Argentine culture
- Italian diaspora
- List of cocktails
- List of national liquors
- South American cuisine
