= Malecon (cocktail) =

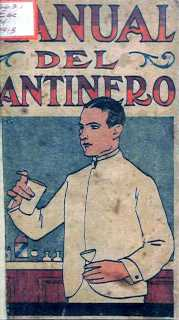
Manual del Cantinero (1915)

The Malecon is a cocktail named after the El Malecón, the winding beachfront avenue atop the seawall in Havana, Cuba.

The cocktail has at least three different main types: a pre-prohibition version from Cuba itself, an updated American version afterwards in 1941, and a more modern version from 2007.

== Malecon cocktail (1915) ==
From John Escalante's Cuban cocktail guide, Manual Del Cantinero. The drink called for equal parts Cognac and Chambéry vermouth (likely a blanc, such as Dolin) as the base, with additions of one dash of gum (sugar) syrup and one dash of Angostura bitters. Garnish with a strawberry.

== Malecon cocktail (1941) ==
From Crosby Gaige's drink book, Cocktail Guide and Ladies' Companion. He said the drink was meant to evoke "the leisure and luxury of Old Havana".

- 1.5 oz. White Rum
- 1.5 oz. Swedish Punsch
- 1.5 oz. Dry Gin
- A dash of apricot brandy

== El Malecón cocktail (2007) ==
As updated by Erik Lorincz when he bartended at the Connaught Bar, London.

- 50ml (1 3/4 oz) Bacardi Superior white rum
- 15ml (1/2 oz) Smith Woodhouse 10-year port
- 10ml (1/3 oz) Don José Reserva Oloroso sherry
- 30ml (1 oz) lime juice
- 2 bar spoons / teaspoons [10ml] (1/3 oz.) caster sugar
- 3 drops Peychaud's Bitters

Lorincz said he was inspired to make the cocktail after a trip to Havana, and that the cocktail represents the feelings the Malecón evoked in him as he walked along its sea wall: simplicity, joy, and life's sweetness balanced by a touch of bitterness.

I have read that the essence of what it means to be Cuban is to accept the inevitabilities of human existence, that we are born and must die, and to make the very best of the life in between and have as good a time as possible. With this admirable attitude in mind, I wanted to create a drink that could be enjoyed at any time of day or night, and that would be at home in the most elegant London cocktail bar and equally at the Malecón in Havana with music, laughter and tobacco smoke in the air.

El Malecón was Lorincz's entry in the "Bacardi Legacy 2007" rum cocktail contest and was one of the reasons he was chosen in 2010 to head the revitalized American Bar at the Savoy Hotel. The Savoy Cocktail Book included the recipe for the original version of a cocktail known as the Havana in 1937.

== Similar cocktails ==
The original recipe for the Havana cocktail listed in books such as the 1937 Cafe Royal Cocktail Book, The Official Mixers Manual, as well as the Savoy Cocktail Book shares many aspects of the 1941 Malecon cocktail both in terms of the backstory of its name and its gin, punsch, and apricot brandy ingredients. The Havana contains much more apricot brandy than the 1941 Malecon however, representing half of the cocktail, and did not contain rum. Compared to the original Havana, the 1941 Malecon cocktail was made less sweet and made more indicative of Cuba by lowering the amount of apricot brandy and calling for white rum (such as Havana Club).

== Additional reading ==
- Cuba’s Overlooked Role in Cocktail History
