= Fratelli Branca =

Italian distillery

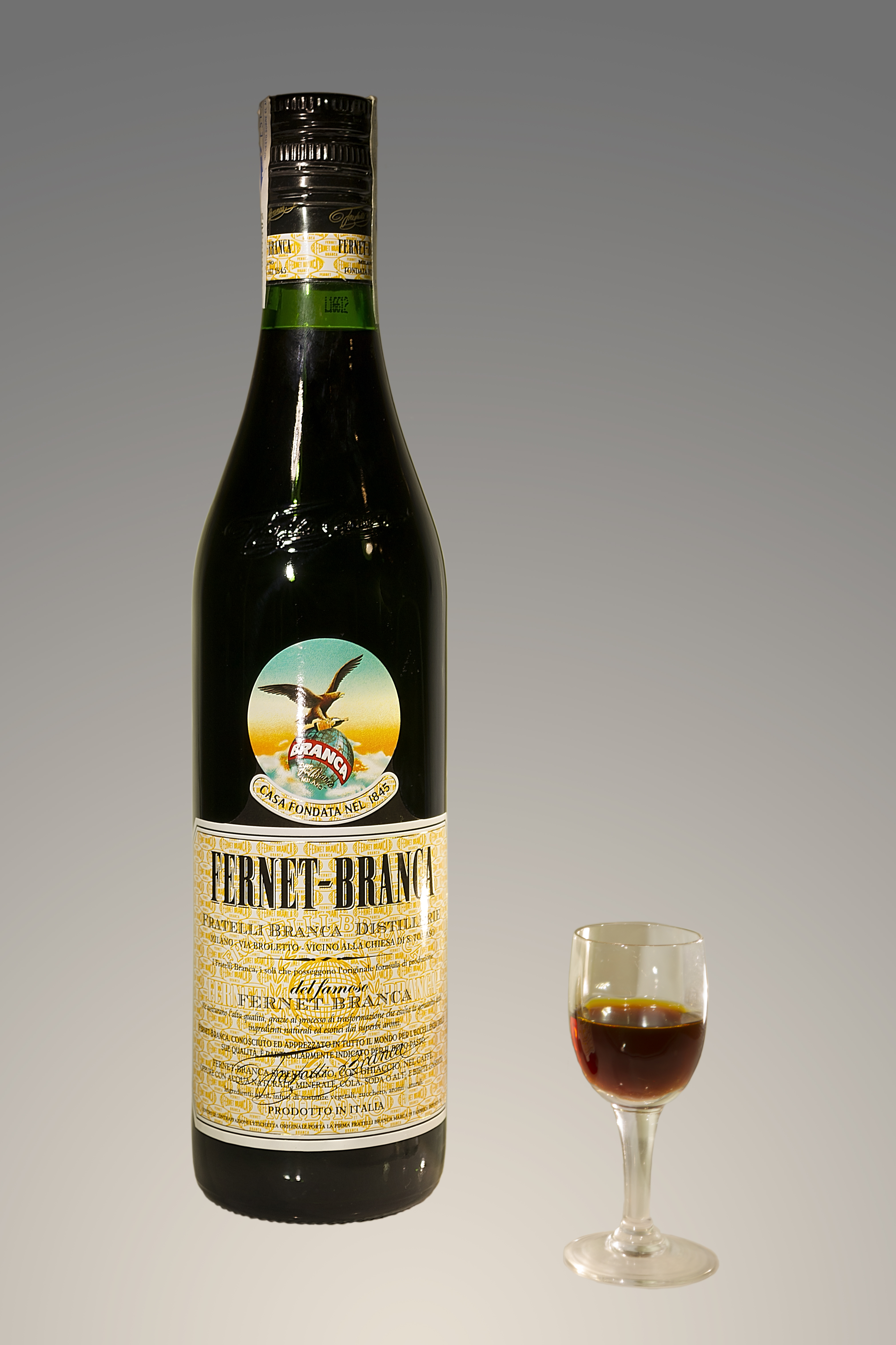
A bottle of Fernet-Branca

Fratelli Branca (formal name: Fratelli Branca Distillerie S.r.l.) is a distillery based in Milan, Italy, that was founded in 1845. Fratelli Branca makes an amaro digestif, Fernet-Branca.

== History ==
The distillery was founded in 1845. During the following decade, the founder was joined by his sons Luigi (1833–1886), Giuseppe (1837–1888) and Stefano (1843–1891), who focused on strengthening the distribution network in Italy and abroad. On the death of Stefano Branca in 1891, a few years after that of his father and brothers, his wife Maria Branca Scala took charge of the management of a company that at that time had about fifty employees and over 300 workers, and which was awarded the following year by the Ministry of Agriculture and Commerce for being among the most distinguished companies in exporting. In 1905, the company's trademark was officially registered—an eagle with spread wings that claw a bottle with the world below—destined for lasting notoriety and conceived by the painter Leopoldo Metlicovitz, exponent of the artistic movement of Liberty and one of the fathers of modern poster design. In 1925, Fratelli Branca opened its first and only production plant outside Italy in Argentina, the country that consumes the most Fernet-Branca due to the popularity of the fernet con coca cocktail. Italian advertising. In 2001, the company purchased from the Carpano family of Turin the rights to produce Punt e Mes.

The Fratelli Branca distillery, the Branca Real Estate and the Centro Studi Fratelli Branca are owned by to Branca International, a holding company controlled by the Branca family. Niccolò Branca is President and CEO. In 2017 Branca International recorded revenues of 364.6 million euros, up 12% compared to 2016.

== Brands ==
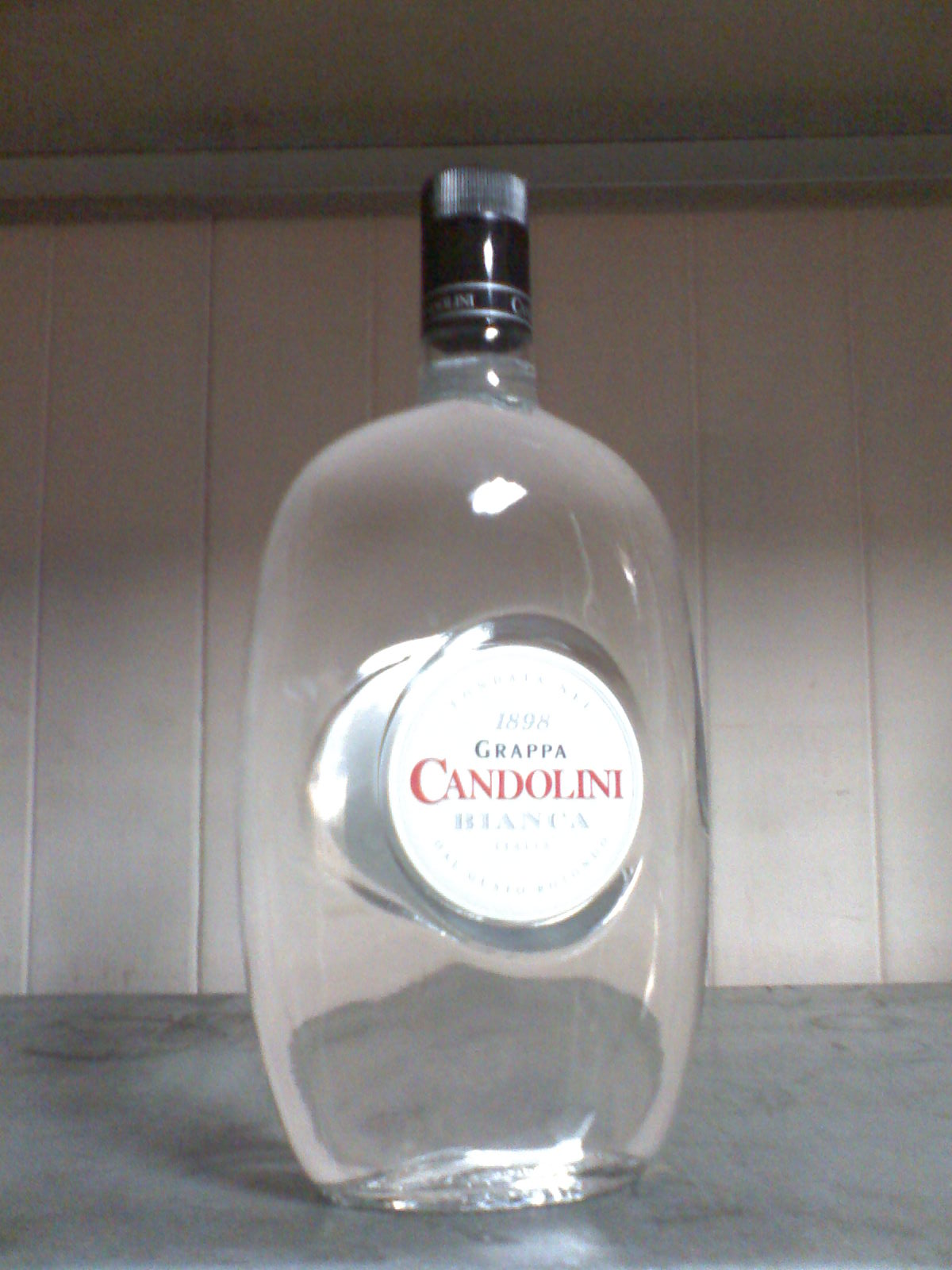
Grappa Candolini

- Fernet-Branca
- Match Whisky (Scotch)
- Branca Menta (Liqueur)
- Branca Stravecchio (Brandy)
- Candolini (Grappa)
- Caffè Borghetti (Amaro)
- Sambuca Borghetti
- Punt e Mes (Vermouth)
- Carpano (the first ever Vermouth (1786))
- Champagne Tsarine (Champagne)
- Sernova (Vodka)
- Villa Branca (Winery in the Chianti Classico region of Tuscany)
