= Vermouth =

Italian aromatized, fortified wine

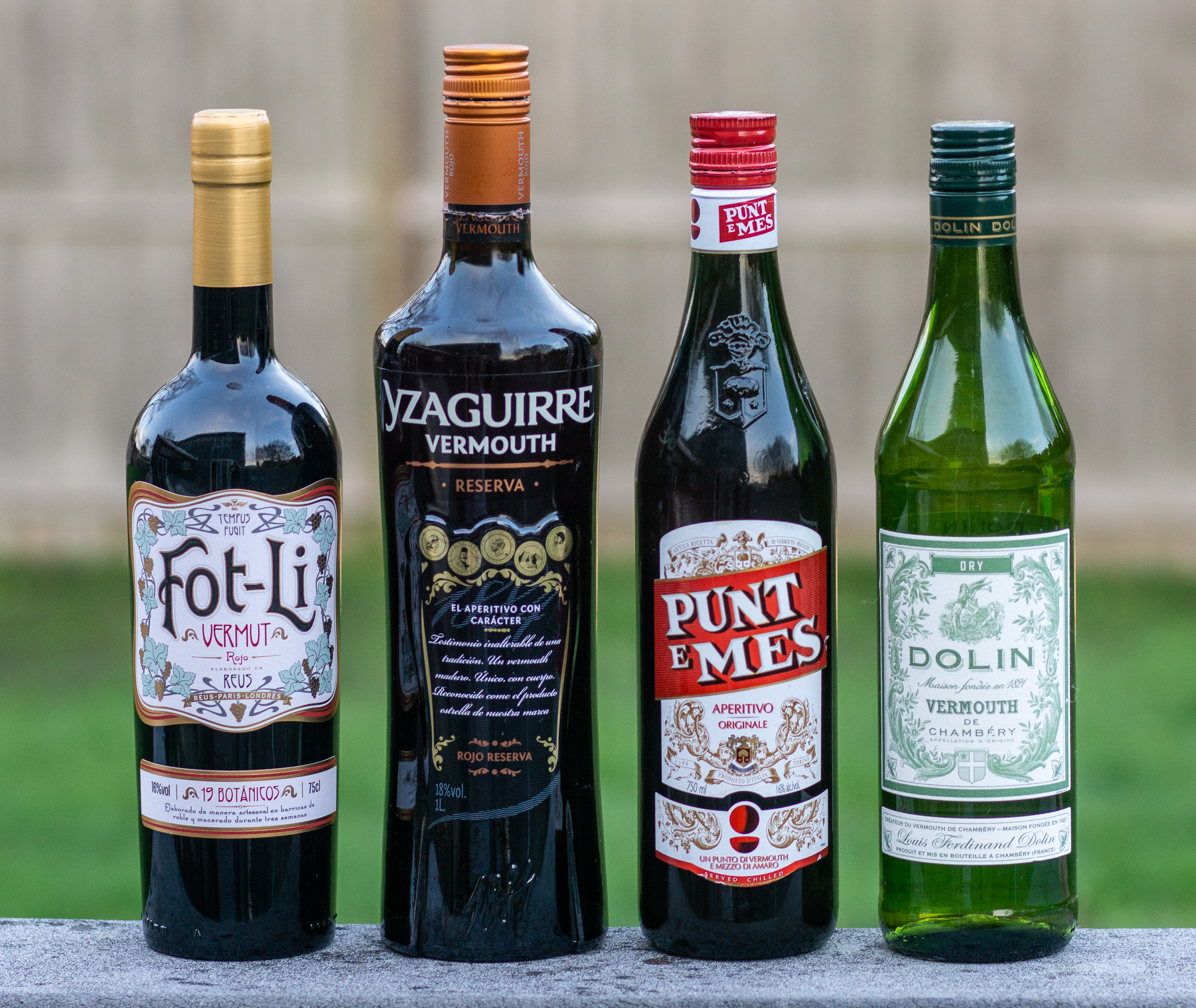
Four bottles of vermouth: Fot-Li and Yzaguirre, red vermouths from Spain; Punt e Mes, red vermouth from Italy; and Dolin, dry vermouth from France

Vermouth (/vərˈmuːθ/, UK also /ˈvɜːməθ/) is an Italian aromatized, fortified wine, flavored with various botanicals (roots, barks, flowers, seeds, herbs, and spices) and sometimes colored, produced mainly in Italy, France and Spain. The modern versions of the beverage were first produced in the mid- to late 18th century in Turin, Italy.

While vermouth was traditionally used for medicinal purposes, it was later served as an apéritif, with fashionable cafés in Turin serving it to guests around the clock. In the late 19th century, it became popular with bartenders as a key ingredient for cocktails, such as the martini, the Manhattan, the Rob Roy, and negroni. In addition to being consumed as an apéritif or cocktail ingredient, vermouth is sometimes used as an alternative to white wine in cooking.

Historically, the two main types of vermouth are sweet and dry. Responding to demand and competition, vermouth manufacturers have created additional styles, including extra-dry white, sweet white (blanc or bianco), red (rosso), amber, and rosé.

Vermouth is produced by starting with a base of neutral grape wine or unfermented wine must. Each manufacturer adds additional alcohol and a proprietary mixture of dry ingredients, consisting of aromatic herbs, roots, and barks, to the base wine, base wine plus spirit, or spirit only – which may be redistilled before adding to the wine or unfermented wine must. After the wine is aromatized and fortified, the vermouth is sweetened with either cane sugar or caramelized sugar, depending on the style.

Italian, French, and Spanish companies produce most of the vermouth consumed throughout the world.

== Etymology and history ==
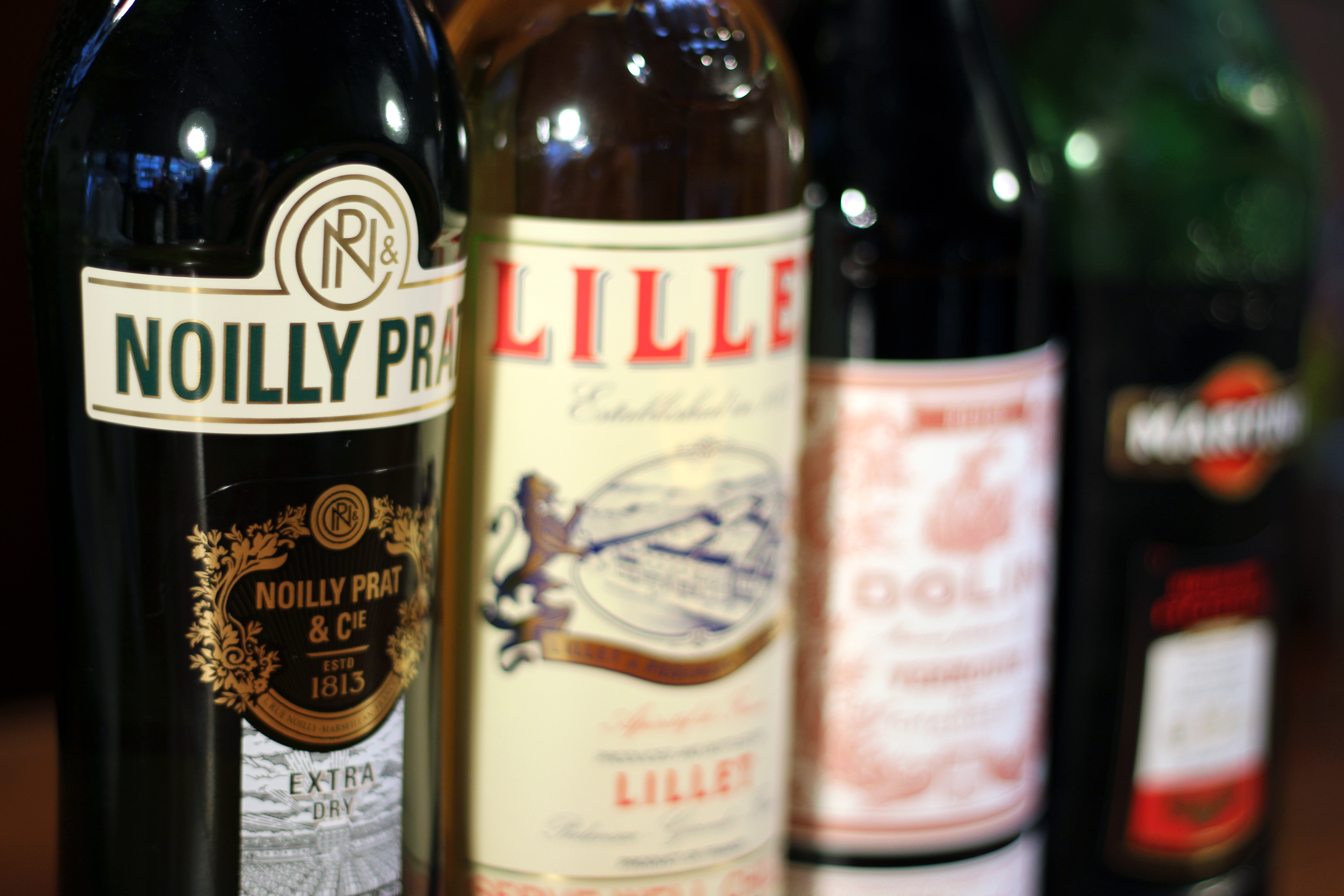
A collection of vermouth and quinquina bottles, including Noilly Prat Extra Dry, Lillet Blanc, Dolin Rouge, and Martini & Rossi Rosso

Evidence for wines modified with herbs or roots has been found in China dating from at least as early as the Shang and Western Zhou dynasties (1250–1000 BC). The extra ingredients were added to wine to make it a medicinal drink. Medicinal drinks made by the alcoholic fermentation of herbs and sugars are mentioned in early Indian texts on medicine, though this does not imply that European vermouths originated from ancient Chinese and Indian drinks. Recipes for infusing white wine date back to ancient Greece from around 400 BC. A popular ingredient was wormwood, based on the assumption that it was effective at treating stomach disorders and intestinal parasites.

It was commonly used in Hungary at least since the 15th century with different species of artemisia plants, such as mugwort or wormwood and other spices such as mustard seeds, horseradish, elfdock, etc. Wormwood is called üröm or irem in Hungarian, hence the drink is called ürmös (wormwoodish) or ürmösbor (wormwoodish wine). In the 16th century, it was used with imported spices, too, including cinnamon, clove, etc. It was well known for healing stomach and digestive problems.

The name "vermouth" is the French pronunciation of the German word Wermut for wormwood that has been used as an ingredient in the drink over its history. Fortified wines containing wormwood as a principal ingredient existed in Germany around the 16th century. Around this time, an Italian merchant named D'Alessio began producing a similar product in Piedmont as a "wormwood wine". D'Alessio's version of the libation contained other botanical ingredients in addition to wormwood. Competing brands emerged shortly thereafter in eastern and southeastern France, each with its own proprietary mix of ingredients, including herbs, roots, bark, and spices. By the mid-17th century, the drink was being consumed in England under the name "vermouth", which has been the common name for the beverage until the present day.

Over time, two distinct versions of vermouth became established, one pale, dry, and bitter, and the other red and sweeter. Merchant Antonio Benedetto Carpano introduced the first sweet vermouth in 1786 in Turin, Italy. The drink reportedly quickly became popular with the royal court of Turin. Around 1800 to 1813, the first pale, dry vermouth was produced in France by Joseph Noilly. However, not all pale vermouths produced over time have been dry, and not all red vermouths have been sweet.

The use of vermouth as a medicinal liquor waned by the end of the 18th century, but its use as an apéritif increased in Italy and France. By the late 19th century, vermouth was being used in cocktails. Bartenders found that it was an ideal mixer for many cocktails, including the Manhattan (beginning around 1880) and the precursors to the martini. In addition, the popular Vermouth cocktail, first appearing in 1868, consisted of chilled vermouth and a twist of lemon peel with the occasional addition of small amounts of bitters or maraschino. The popularity of vermouth-heavy cocktails in America, often using twice as much vermouth as gin or whiskey, continued through the 1880s and 1890s.

Although the amount of vermouth used in cocktail recipes had somewhat declined, it has recently been experiencing a rise in popularity among bartenders, as a key ingredient in many cocktails. Vermouth gained popularity in the 1950s with help from the martini, which was being marketed by liquor companies. Product placement and celebrity endorsements from personalities such as Ernest Hemingway and Humphrey Bogart helped to increase the martini's profile. However, the most successful advertiser of the martini was the fictional character James Bond.

The popularity of vermouth in the United States and Great Britain declined after the mid-20th century, but was still used in those countries in many classic cocktails such as the Manhattan, albeit in smaller amounts. The drink is more popular in other parts of Europe (such as Italy, France, and Spain, where it is often consumed by itself as an apéritif). It is also very popular in Argentina, where—due to major Italian immigration during the late 19th and early 20th centuries—it is more than a drink; it is a cultural tradition among families, at the table and afterwards.

In the years since 2013, interest in vermouth has renewed in the US. Artisanal makers have created new brands of vermouth that do not seek to imitate European styles, and vermouth has been a fast-growing category within the wine trade.

== Production, ingredients, and flavors ==
Several wine grapes, including Clairette blanche, Piquepoul, Bianchetta Trevigiana, Catarratto, and Trebbiano, are generally used as the base ingredients for vermouths. From these grapes, a low-alcohol white wine is produced by vermouth manufacturers. The wine may be aged for a short while before the addition of other ingredients. For sweet vermouths, sugar syrup is added before the wine is fortified with extra alcohol.

The added alcohol is usually a neutral grape spirit, but may also come from vegetable sources such as sugar beets. The wine is then placed in large barrels or tanks to which the dry ingredients have already been added. The mixture is stirred at intervals until the dry ingredients have been absorbed and the drink is ready for bottling. Red vermouths can derive their color from botanicals, added red wine, or sometimes from caramel color. Rose-colored vermouth uses red and white wines as its base. Most vermouths are bottled at between 16% and 18% ABV, as compared with the 9–14% ABV of most unfortified wines.

Spice ingredients often used in vermouths include cloves, cinnamon, quinine, citrus peel, cardamom, marjoram, chamomile, coriander, juniper, hyssop, ginger, and labdanum. The prohibition of wormwood as a drink ingredient in the early 20th century in some countries sharply reduced its use in vermouth, but small amounts of the herb are still sometimes included in artisan products. Vermouth brand recipes vary, with most manufacturers marketing their own unique flavor and version of the beverage. Vermouth manufacturers keep their recipes for the drink secret.

Sweet vermouths usually contain 10–15% sugar. The sugar content in dry vermouths generally does not exceed 4%. Dry vermouths usually are lighter in body than sweet vermouths.

In addition to pale and red vermouths, there exist golden and rosé versions, but these are not as internationally popular. The region of Chambéry in France has received an appellation d'origine contrôlée for its vermouths, which is where the blanc style originated and also includes a strawberry-flavored version called Chambéryzette. Lillet, St. Raphael, and Dubonnet are fortified wines similar to vermouth, but are usually considered separate products. The two predominant styles of vermouth – the red, Italian rosso and the dry, white vermouth from France – were created and commercialized more than two centuries ago.

The term "Italian vermouth" is often used to refer to red-colored, mildly bitter, and slightly sweet vermouths. These types of vermouths have also been called "rosso". The label "French vermouth" generally refers to pale, dry vermouths that are more bitter than sweet vermouths. The extra bitterness is often obtained by using nutmeg or bitter orange peel in the drink recipe. Blanc or Bianco is a name given to a type of pale, sweeter vermouth.

According to Stuart Walton and Brian Glover, vermouth "is as far removed from the natural produce of the vine as it is possible for a fortified wine to get."

== Modern use ==
=== Beverage ===
Vermouth is a common cocktail ingredient, particularly in martinis and Manhattans. When vermouth is drunk by itself it is normally consumed as an apéritif. Vermouth is used as an ingredient in many different cocktails, as people found it beneficial for lowering the alcohol content of cocktails with strong spirits as their base, for providing a pleasant herbal flavor and aroma, and for accentuating the flavors in the base liquor. As previously stated, vermouth is an ingredient in the martini, one of the most popular and well-known cocktails. At first, martinis used sweet vermouth. Around 1904, however, drier French vermouths began to be used in the cocktail. The term "dry martini" originally meant using drier vermouth as a mixer, not using less vermouth, as in the modern definition.

Sharon Tyler Herbst's book, The Ultimate A-To-Z Bar Guide, lists 112 cocktails using dry vermouth and 82 containing sweet vermouth. Cocktails using either dry or sweet vermouth or both include the Americano, Bronx, Gibson, Malecon, Manhattan, Negroni, Rob Roy, and Rose. Variations of cocktail recipes using equal portions of dry and sweet vermouths are called perfect, as in a Perfect Manhattan.

=== Cooking ===
While vermouth can be used as a substitute for white wine in food recipes, because it is more flavorful than wine, it may be overwhelming when used in certain dishes. The herbs in dry vermouth make it an attractive ingredient in sauces for fish dishes or as a marinade for other meats, including pork and chicken.

=== Storing ===
Because vermouth is fortified, an opened bottle will not sour as quickly as white wine. Opened vermouth, however, will gradually deteriorate over time. Gourmets recommend that opened bottles of vermouth be consumed within one to three months and should be kept refrigerated to slow oxidation.

== Notable brands ==
The Carpano family originated several notable brands of vermouth, including Punt e Mes, a deep red vermouth with sweet and bitter flavors, and the Antica Formula brand, a bitter, fuller-flavored version of vermouth. Distillerie Fratelli Branca of Milan bought 50% of the Giuseppe B. Carpano company in 1982 and acquired the company outright in 2001. Gancia, Drapò Vermouth, Delmistero, 9diDANTE and Cocchi are other Italian producers.

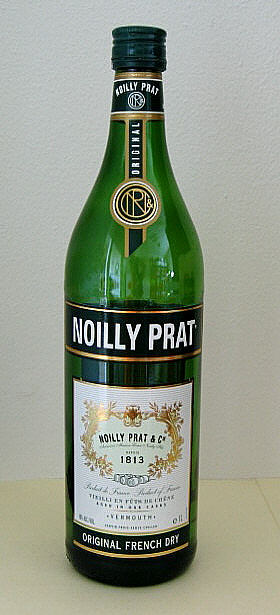
A bottle of Noilly Prat vermouth

The Cinzano family began production in 1757 in Turin. Their Bianco product is sweet, pale vermouth.

Dolin vermouth from Chambéry, France, has been made since 1815. Their product lineup carries both a traditional dry, two different kinds of sweet (red and blanco), and a strawberry (chamberyzette). Dolin is recognized as creating the blanc style.

Martini & Rossi, the top-selling international brand of vermouth, started in 1863 in Turin and produces both dry and sweet vermouths, but is mostly known for its Rosso. Cinzano and Martini & Rossi also produce rosé vermouths, which are mainly distributed in Italy and France.

Noilly Prat, based in southern France, is primarily known for its dry, pale vermouths, but also produces a sweeter version. The company was founded by Joseph Noilly in 1813.

Esquimalt Vermouth & Apéritifs, on Vancouver Island, Canada, is the first producer outside Europe to win two gold medals at London's 2023 World Vermouth Awards. In the blind tasting competition, they were judged best for both Dry Vermouth, and also for Semi-Sweet Vermouth (for its Rosso). A year after the company began production, Esquimalt Vermouth & Apéritifs won a gold medal at the 2020 San Francisco World Spirits Competition. The following year, 2021, they were awarded three double gold medals for their dry vermouth, the semisweet Rosso, and their Kina-Rouge.

== See also ==
- Punt e Mes
- Amaro (liqueur)
