= Fernet =

Type of amaro, a bitter, aromatic spirit

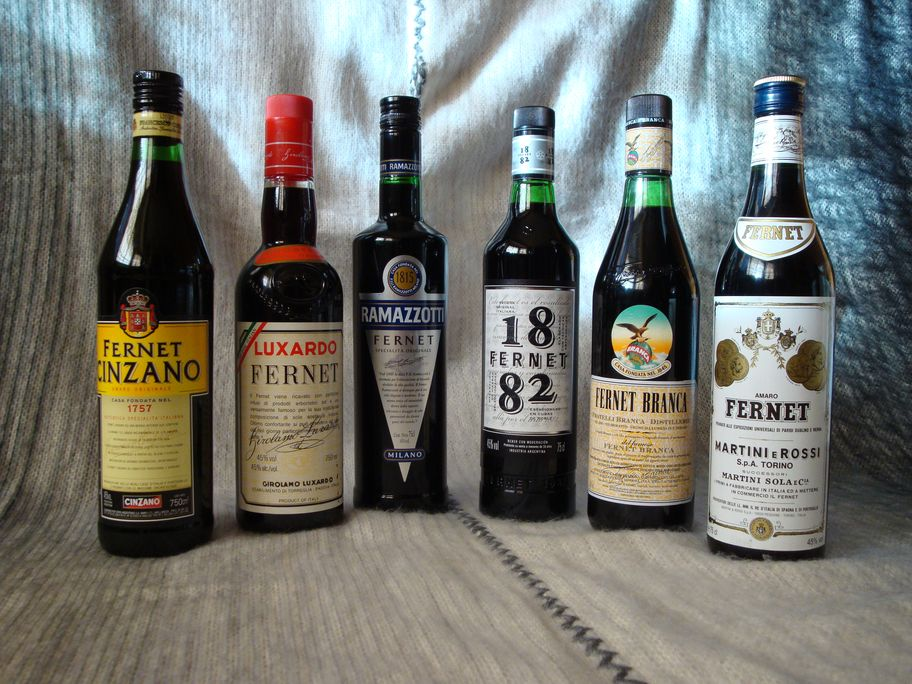
Several brands of fernet sold in Argentina. From left to right: Cinzano, Luxardo, Ramazzotti, 1882, Fernet-Branca, and Martini.

Fernet (Italian: [ferˈnɛt]) is an Italian type of amaro, a bitter, aromatic spirit. Fernet is made from a number of herbs and spices which vary according to the brand, but usually include myrrh, rhubarb, chamomile, cardamom, aloe, and especially saffron, with a base of distilled grape spirits.

Fernet is usually served as a digestif after a meal but may also be served with coffee and espresso or mixed into coffee and espresso drinks. It may be served at room temperature or with ice.

The Italian liqueur Fernet-Branca, developed in 1845, has a cult following in the international bartending community and is popular in Argentina, which consumes more than 75% of all fernet produced globally and hosts Fratelli Branca's only distillery outside of Italy. Because it is traditionally mixed with Coca-cola, fernet has also contributed in making Argentina one of the world's leading consumers of the soft drink. This cocktail, fernet con coca or fernandito, is so ubiquitous in Argentina that it has been described as "the country's unofficial drink".

== Popularity ==
=== In Argentina ===
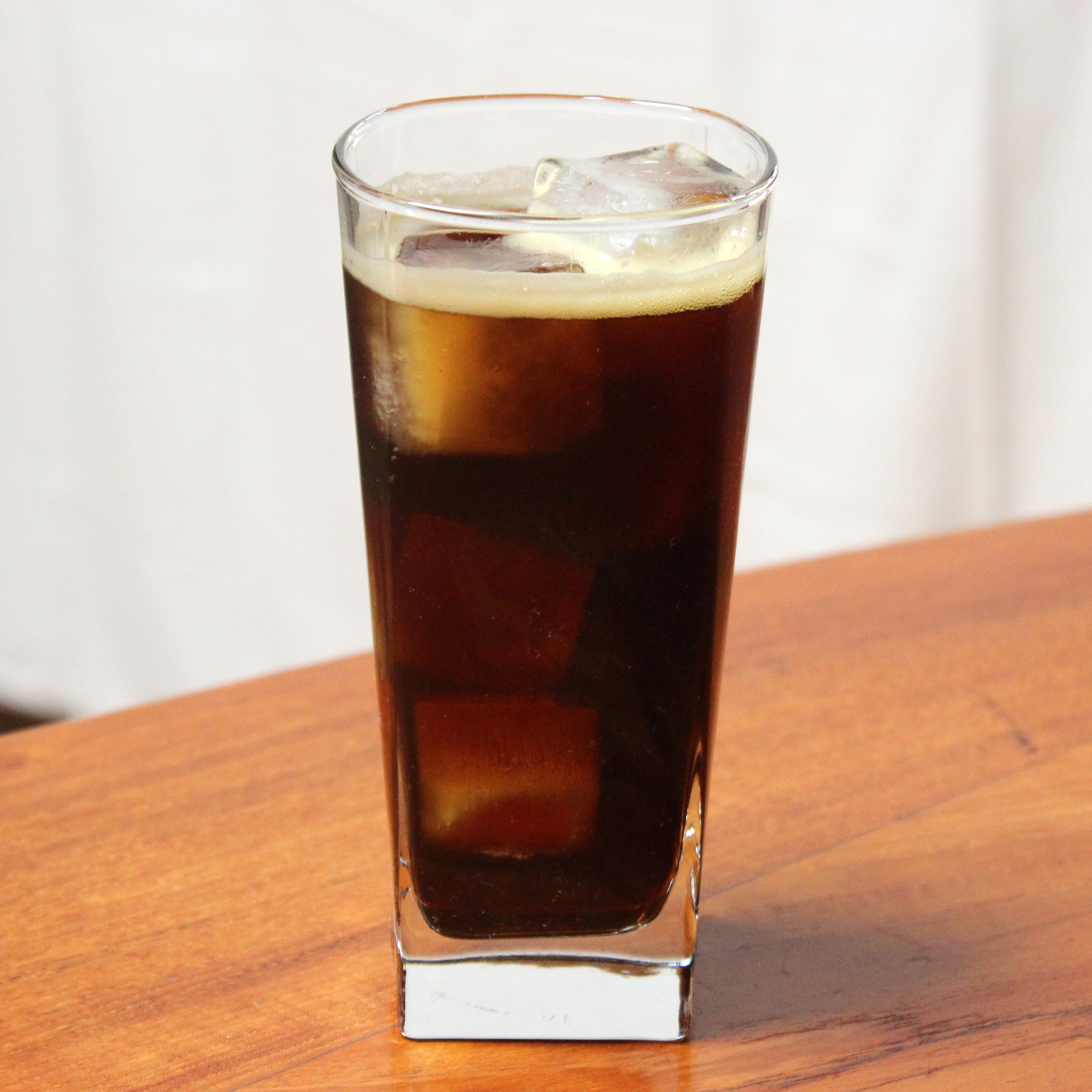
Fernet con coca (English: Fernet and Coke), a cultural icon of Argentina

Fernet was introduced to Argentina by Italians during the Great European immigration wave to the country of the late 19th century and early 20th century. It is particularly associated with Córdoba Province, which has been called "the world fernet capital"; almost three million litres are consumed there annually, representing just under 30 percent of national consumption. National production is around 25 million liters, with 35% sold in Buenos Aires city and province. Fernet-Branca is by far the most popular brand in the country, leading the market and reaching a "mythical" status among Argentines. Other popular brands include 1882, Capri, Ramazzotti and Vittone.

Fernet is commonly mixed with Coca-Cola, a mixed drink known as fernet con coca (Spanish for "fernet and Coke") or fernando. While long available, the drink became much more popular in the mid-1980s, encouraged by advertisements of Fratelli Branca in TV stations with national scope, its popularity growing steadily ever since. Consumption of fernet increased greatly in the first decade of the 21st century. By the early 2010s, the popularity of relatively inexpensive fernet was so high that many bars in Buenos Aires removed it from their menus to encourage sales of more expensive drinks.

=== In Chile ===
In Chile fernet sales have surged in the early 2020s, with a threefold increase from 2018 to 2022 and a 50% increase in 2024 alone. The popularity of fernet in Chile is attributed to a diffusion from Argentina; a country that is geographically and culturally close to Chile. The influence of Argentines residing in Chile is also credited as a contributing factor for the popularity of fernet.

Pisco remain the most popular distilled beverage in Chile and its per capita consumption has not decreased despite fernet's increased popularity. As of 2023 fernet was considered particularly liked by Chilean youths. Fernet is commonly consumed with coke as fernet con coca in Chile but some variants of traditional Chilean drinks such as terremoto are also on occasion made with fernet. According to La Piojera, fernet is an ingredient in the original recipe of terremoto, but it was replaced at some point by grenadine.

=== In Czechia ===
The Czech-manufactured Fernet Stock brand is popular in Czechia, where it is served as shots or as part of different cocktails. Other brands produced in Czechia are, for example, Altfernet, R. Jelínek, and Šitner Fernet.

=== In the United States ===
The drink has been popular in the San Francisco Bay Area since before Prohibition. In 2008, San Francisco accounted for 25% of US consumption. San Francisco bars usually serve fernet as a shot followed by a ginger ale chaser.

== Cocktails ==
Fernet can be mixed into cocktails, though the strong taste can overwhelm other ingredients. It can replace bitters in recipes; for instance, the Fanciulli cocktail is a Manhattan with fernet instead of Angostura bitters.

The chef Fergus Henderson offers a recipe, entitled both "A Miracle" and "Dr. Henderson", that approximates Branca Menta (a fernet with menthols and peppermint), by combining two parts fernet with one part crème de menthe over ice. The recipe describes this cocktail as a cure for overindulgence.

Fernet is one of the original ingredients of terremoto before it was replaced by grenadine to give it a less bitter taste. Terremoto is still sometimes made with fernet.

== In popular culture ==
- Fernet-Branca forms the titular subject of James Hamilton-Paterson's 2004 novel of Tuscany expatriate life, Cooking with Fernet Branca.
- Silverada's 2019 song "You Look Good in Neon" makes reference to Fernet in its chorus. Fans of the band have taken to buying shots of the drink at concerts.
- In computer programming, the well-established Fernet cryptographic "recipe" and associated libraries (for AES-CBC, HMAC-SHA256 etc) is named after the drink.

== See also ==
Media related to Fernet at Wikimedia Commons

- Fernet-Branca
