= Gancia =

Italian vinery established in 1850

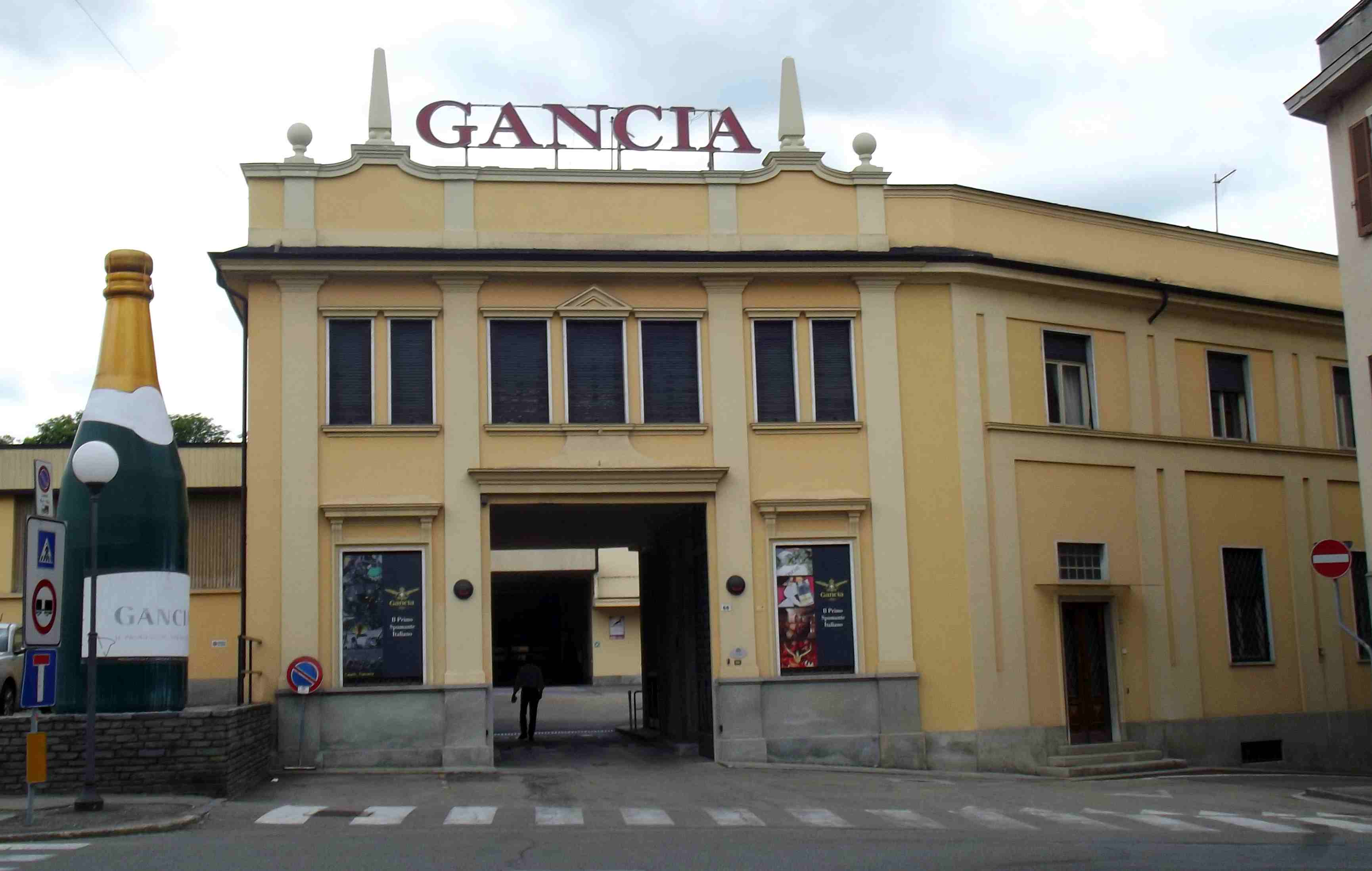
Historical Gancia cellars in Canelli.

Gancia is an Italian wine-making company which produces a broad range of sparkling and still wines from the Piedmont region.

== History ==
The company was founded in 1850 in Turin by Carlo Gancia. Carlo Gancia is known as the father of Italian sparkling wine, producing the first sparkling wine made with the Classic Method (or Traditional Method) in Piedmont in 1850 on his return from France where he had studied the production techniques of champagne.

After 15 years of trials and small batches, he commercialized it on a large scale in 1865. This innovative wine is still produced today, a premium Asti DOCG, aged for at least 24 months.

Due to the complexity of the process Gancia is the only winery producing this product. The company is also known for its Gancia Aperitivo Originale. Like other Italian alcoholic beverages (such as Fernet), the American Gancia is consumed massively in Argentina.

On the occasion of the 170th anniversary of its foundation, the company was honored by the Italian government with the issue of a commemorative stamp reproducing a 1922 advertising poster by Leonetto Cappiello.

After more than a decade of control by entities linked to the Russian Standard Group, in 2025 the shareholding structure of Gancia S.p.A. was fully restructured: the company returned to being entirely owned by Italian shareholders.

== Products ==
Gancia produces still and sparkling wines made from grapes like Brachetto, Chardonnay, Pinot noir, Pinot grigio and Pinot bianco. They also produce Rosso, Bianco and Extra Dry vermouth.

== See also ==
- List of Italian companies
