= Modernista (cocktail) =

Scotch whisky cocktail

The Modernista is a scotch whisky cocktail livened up by the addition of absinthe/pastis and arrack-based Swedish Punsch. It was listed in Ted Haigh's book Vintage Spirits and Forgotten Cocktails, and is also known as the Modern Maid cocktail. A bitter cocktail balanced by punsch, it has been called "a sophisticated, if challenging, beverage".

== Preparation ==
- 2 ounces (1/2 gill, 6 cl) Scotch
- 1/2 ounce (1/8 gill, 1.5 cl) Dark Jamaican rum
- 1 teaspoon absinthe or pastis (Pernod, herbsaint, and richard all work)
- 1/2 ounce (1/8 gill, 1.5 cl) Swedish Punsch
- 1/2 ounce (1/8 gill, 1.5 cl) fresh lemon juice
- 2 dashes orange bitters
- Shake in an iced cocktail shaker, and strain into cocktail glass.
- Add a lemon twist

== Variations & Similar cocktails ==
Some variations substitute the scotch for gin. When sloe-gin is substituted for harder-to-find Swedish Punsch, the cocktail is listed as the Modern Cocktail No2 in The Savoy Cocktail Book, or simply as the Modern cocktail.

== See also ==
- List of cocktails
