= Spaghett =

Beer cocktail made with Miller High Life, Aperol, and lemon juice

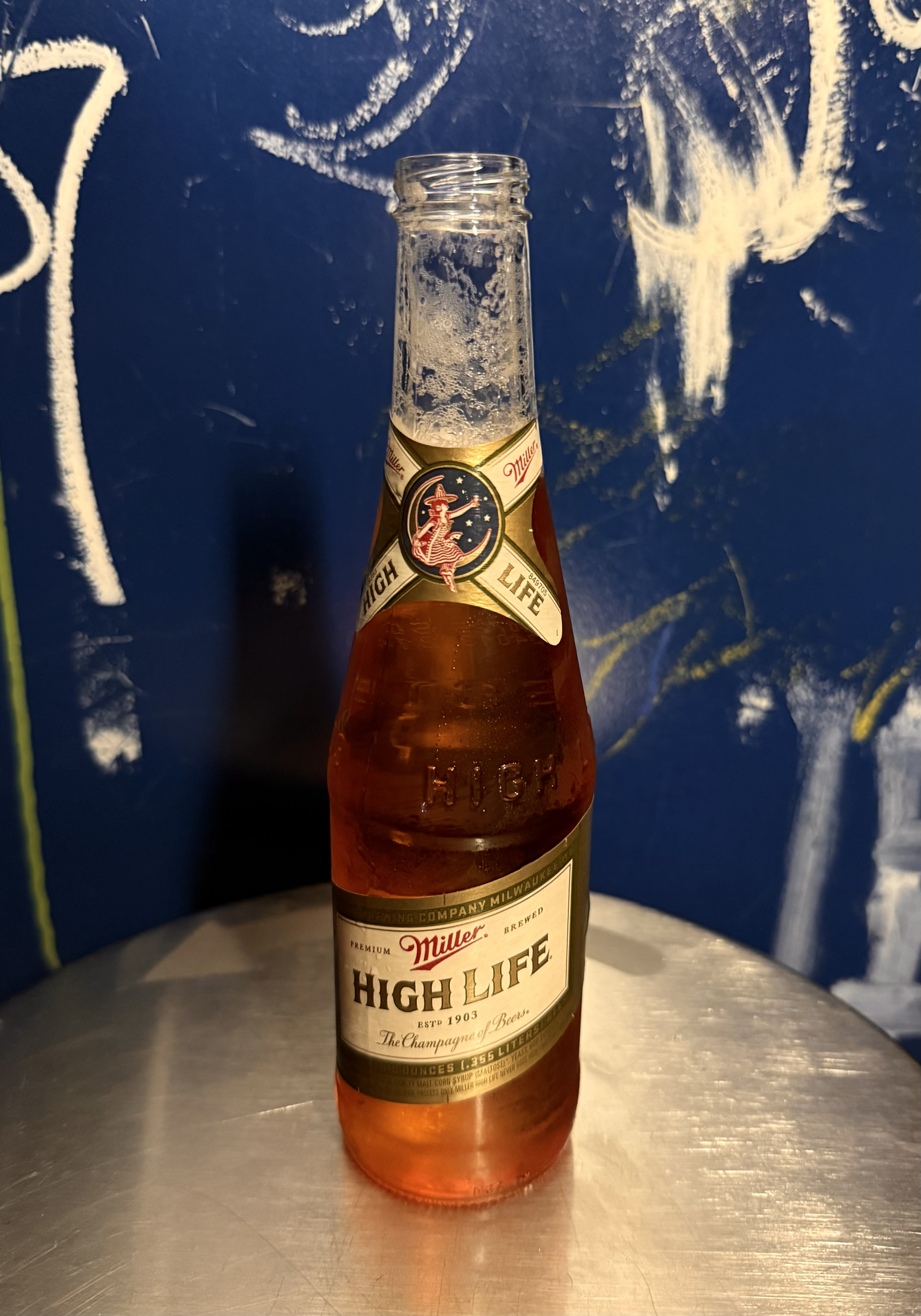
- Type: Beer cocktail
- Ingredients: 10 oz. Miller High Life; 1 oz. Aperol; 1/2 oz. lemon juice
- Base spirit: Beer
- Standard drinkware: Miller High Life bottle
- Standard garnish: Lemon wedge (optional)
- Served: Straight up: chilled, without ice
- Preparation: Drink or pour roughly two oz. of beer from the bottle. Add the remaining ingredients directly into the bottle.

The Spaghett (originally Spagett) is a beer cocktail made with Miller High Life, Aperol, and lemon juice. The ingredients are combined and served in the Miller High Life's long-neck bottle. In some variations, the more bitter Campari is used in place of Aperol.

Created in Baltimore in 2016, the cocktail has been described as an American reimagining of the Italian Aperol spritz.

== History ==
The Spaghett was invented in 2016 by bartender Reed Cahill at Wet City Brewery in Baltimore. Originally spelled "Spagett", the drink was named after the eponymous spaghetti-eating character from the television series Tim and Eric Awesome Show, Great Job!. As Wet City Brewery manager PJ Sullivan described: "We named it Spagett because it's a bastardized Aperol spritz, which is an elegant Italian cocktail. And the character in the Tim and Eric skit is a weirdo eating spaghetti."

From 2016 to 2019, the Spaghett was mostly a Wet City Brewery specialty, and not very well known. In 2019, New York-based journalist Alex Delany happened to be at Wet City Brewery and ordered one from the specialty menu out of curiosity; loving the drink, he enthused about it in a Bon Appétit article, calling it his favorite summer drink. The article became Bon Appétit best-performing cocktail story that year. It was soon found in local bars and house parties. Every year on Aug. 6, the date the Bon Appétit was published, Wet City Brewing celebrates "Spaghett Day".

Spaghett gained popularity and garnered a cult following. Delany said "It's an everyman's drink. The barrier to entry is almost nonexistent." No special equipment is required to make it, and it is composed of three simple and easily acquired ingredients.

== Reception ==
M. Carrie Allan of The Washington Post called the Spaghett "essentially a beer spritz," suggesting that its presentation in a Miller High Life bottle serves as "a bit of a wink at its high-brow/low-brow fusion." Lena Abraham of The Kitchn similarly called the drink her "go-to summer cocktail," writing, "The signature effervescence of the High Life lent a velvety texture to the cocktail that, when paired with the fruity flavors, reminded me of an ice cream float." Stef Ferrari of The Daily Meal noted that the pear, pineapple, and citrus notes of the Miller High Life's galena hops complement the "orange zest quality with a subtly sweet vanilla-like character" of the Aperol.

Samantha Maxwell of Paste wrote that "part of the appeal is the fact that this cocktail is just so easy to make," also noting the beverage's low alcohol by volume compared to most cocktails.

== See also ==
- Ranch water
- Shandy
