= Cynar =

Italian bitter apéritif

- Cynar and Cynar 70
- Type: Bitters
- Manufacturer: Campari Group
- Origin: Italy
- Alcohol by volume: 16.5% (Cynar) or 35% (Cynar 70)
- Proof (US): 33 or 70
- Colour: Dark brown
- Flavour: Bittersweet
- Website: www.camparigroup.com/en/spiritheque/cynar

Cynar (Italian: [tʃiˈnar]) is an Italian bitter apéritif of the amaro variety. It is made from 13 herbs and plants, predominantly artichoke (Cynara scolymus), from which the drink derives its name. Cynar is dark brown and has a bittersweet flavor, and its strength is 16.5% alc/vol. It was launched in Italy in 1952. A version with 35% ABV, Cynar 70 Proof, became available in the 2010s. Since 1995, Cynar has been manufactured and distributed by the Campari Group.

== Use ==
Cynar can be consumed by itself or mixed with soda water and lemon or orange slice, or with cola, eggnog, tonic water, milk, or bitter lemon soda. Europeans often mix it with orange juice, especially in Switzerland and Southern Germany, where Cynar and orange juice is a popular combination. A variation of the Negroni cocktail uses Cynar in place of Campari, in the same way that a Cynar spritz replaces Aperol in an Aperol spritz. Because of its artichoke component, Cynar is regarded as a digestif as well as an apéritif.

It is common in Brazil, where it is also produced. It is usually consumed with Cachaça and sweet Vermouth in one of the more traditional drinks of Brazil, "rabo-de-galo", a rough translation of the word cocktail.

In Argentina, where it is also produced locally, it is common to be mixed with grapefruit soda, usually Paso de los Toros or Schweppes.

== Advertising ==
Cynar became popular during the early 1960s after its appearance on the Italian television advertising show Carosello. The series of commercials, first starring Ferruccio De Ceresa, and from 1966 Ernesto Calindri, showed the actor sipping Cynar while sitting at a table placed in the middle of a busy street, urging consumers to drink Cynar "against the wear-and-tear of modern life". Toward the end of the 1970s, the commercial changed settings and moved from the busy city to a field of artichokes. The partnership between Calindri and the brand lasted until 1984.

== See also ==
- Aperol
- Campari
- Fernet
- Select (apéritif)
