= Aperol =

Italian bitter apéritif

- Type: Apéritif
- Manufacturer: Campari Group
- Origin: Padua, Italy
- Introduced: 1919
- Alcohol by volume: 11%
- Website: www.aperol.com

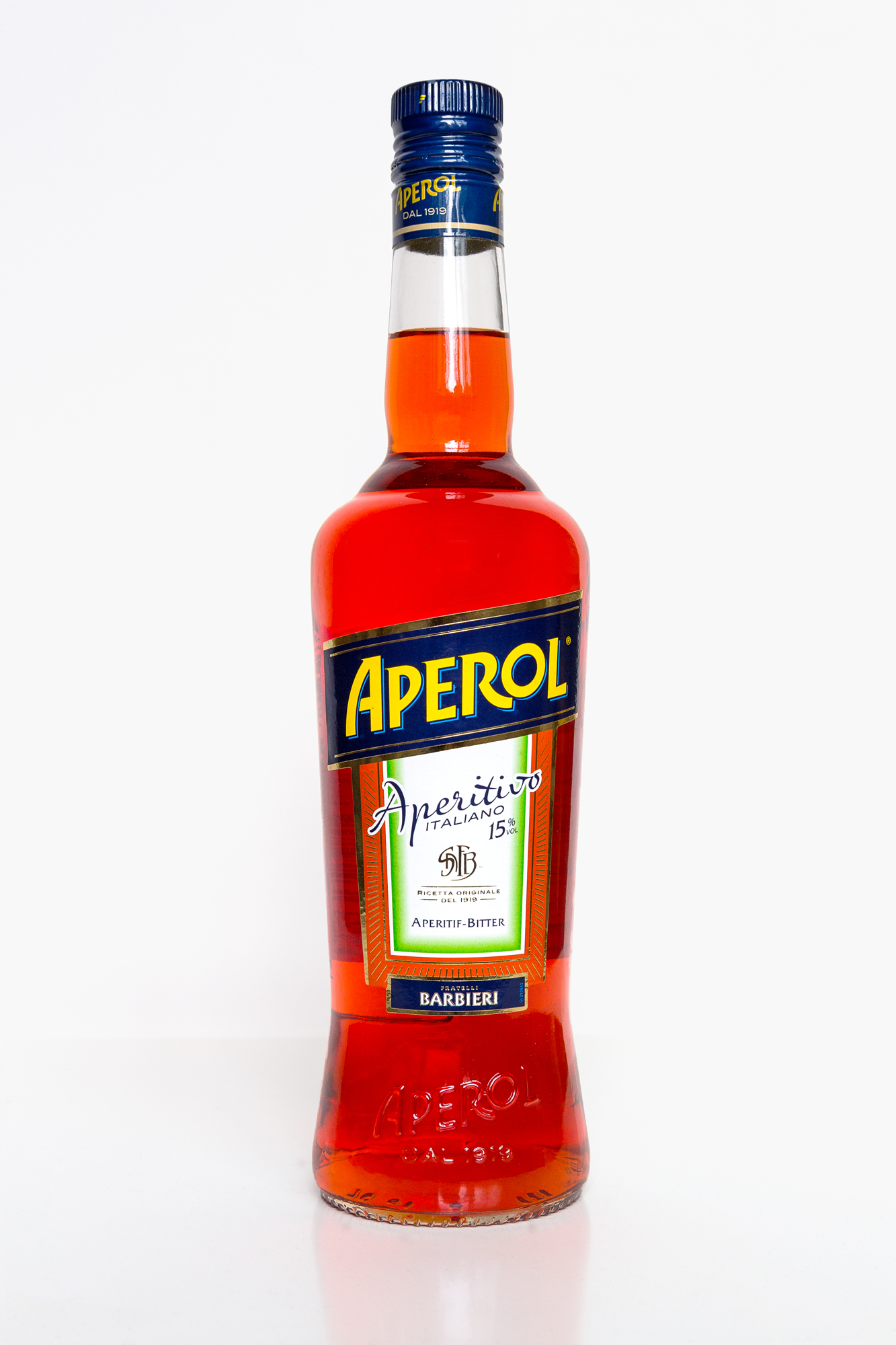
Aperol

Aperol (/ˈæpəroʊl/ AP-ər-ohl, Italian: [ˈaːperol]) is an Italian bitter apéritif made with gentian, rhubarb, and cinchona, among other ingredients. It has a clear orange hue. Its name comes from apero, a French slang word for 'apéritif'.

== History ==
Aperol was originally created in 1919 by Luigi and Silvio Barbieri after seven years of experimentation. It did not become widely popular until after World War II. It was first produced by the Barbieri company, based in Padua, but is now produced by the Campari Group. Aperol tastes and smells sweeter than Campari, and has an alcohol content of 11%—less than half that of Campari.

Aperol sold in Germany had an alcohol content of 15% for some time to comply with German container deposit legislation; since 2021, it has been sold with an alcohol content of 11%.

Aperol grew in popularity and is most commonly known for being mixed with Prosecco and a splash of club soda (Aperol Spritz).

== Mix variants ==
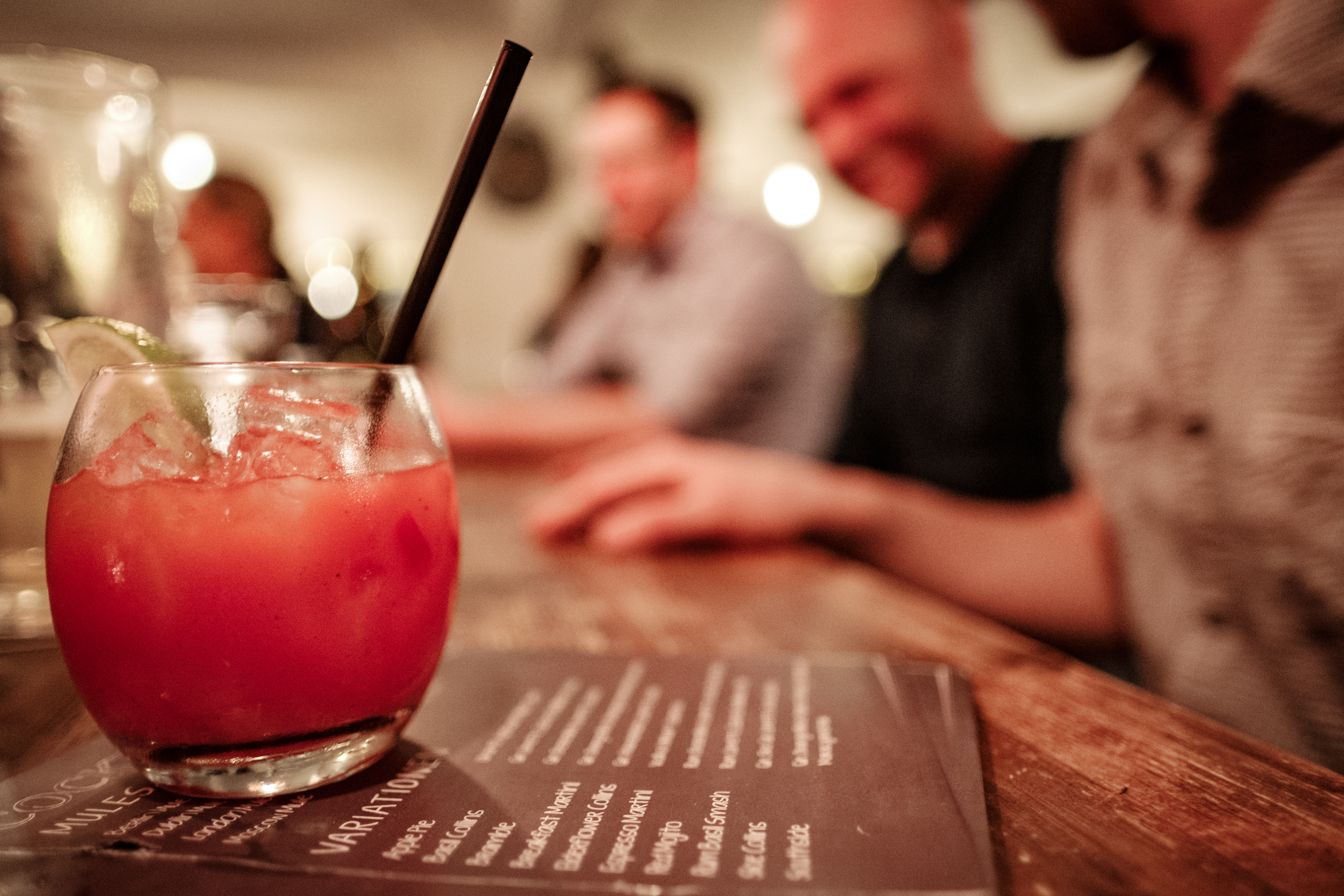
An Aperol sour in a bar in Tübingen

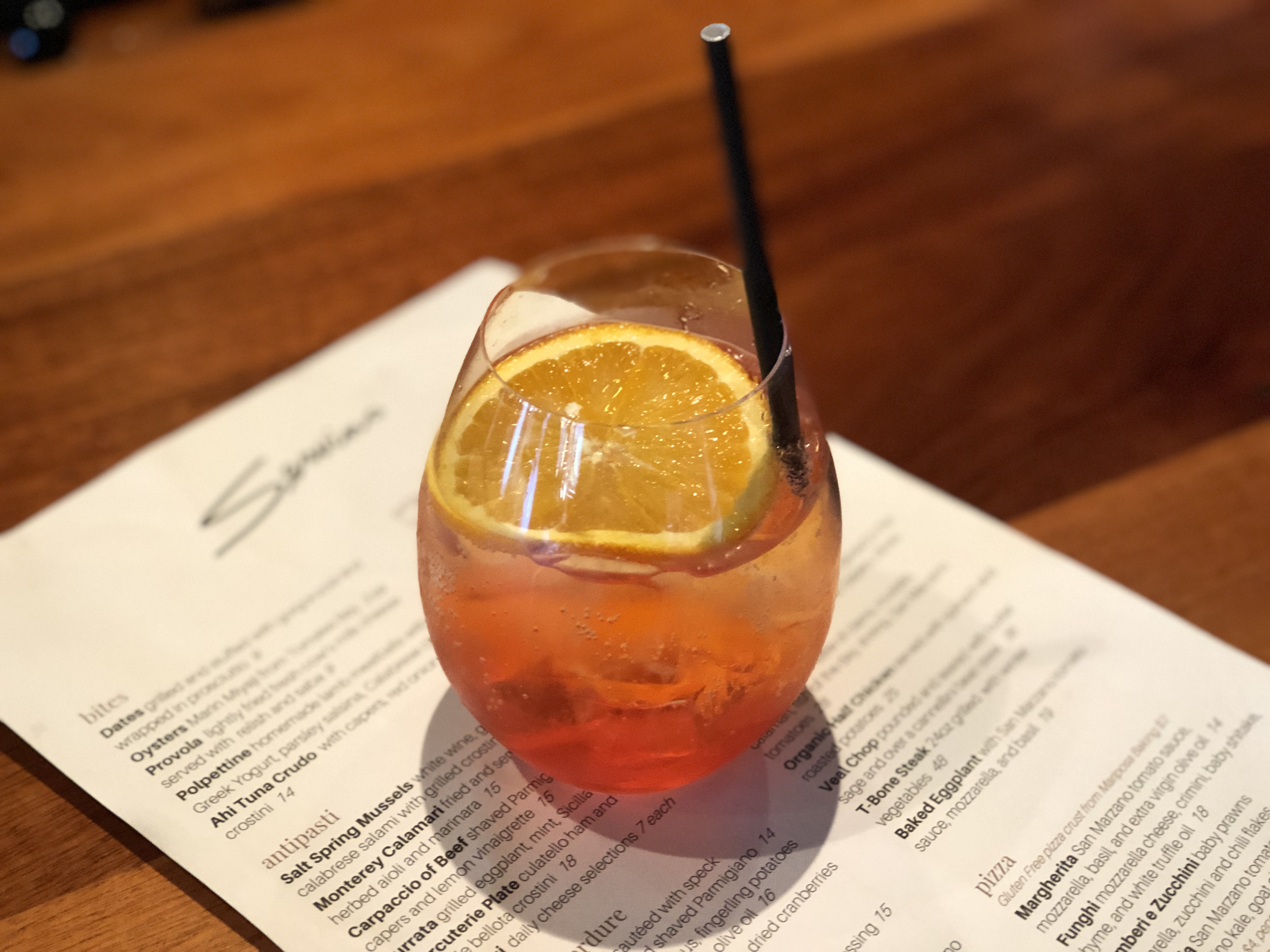
Aperol spritz, popular worldwide

The spritz, an apéritif cocktail, is often made using Aperol. The result is known as the Aperol spritz. Another variant is the Aperol sour.

== Sponsorship ==
Since April 2010, Aperol has been the official sponsor of MotoGP, the Grand Prix motorcycle racing series.

Aperol partnered with Manchester United F.C. as the club's official global spirits partner from January 2014 until the end of the 2016–2017 season.

== See also ==
- Cinzano
- Cynar
- Fernet
- Select
- Spaghett
