= Select (apéritif) =

Italian apéritif

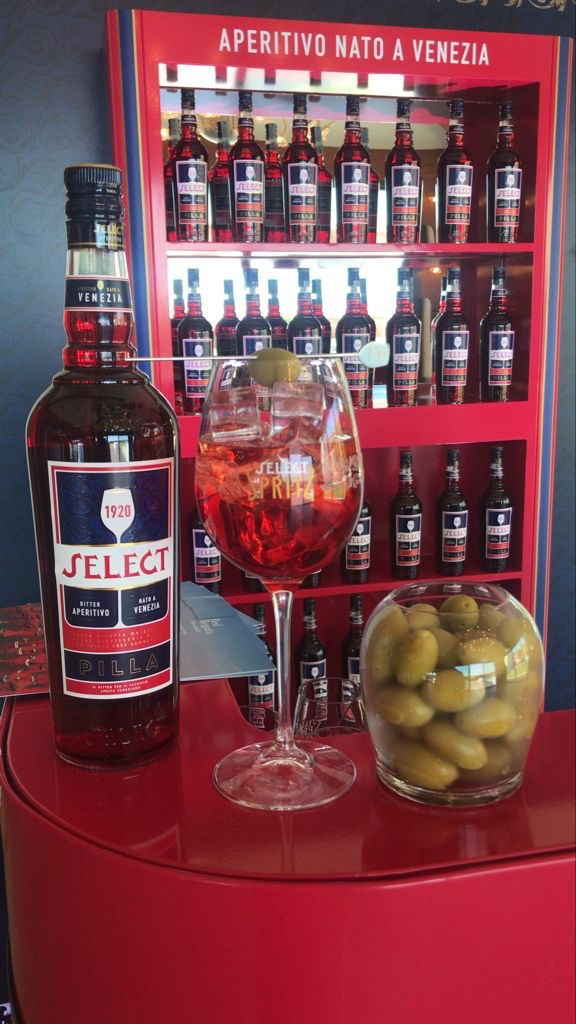
- Type: Bitters
- Manufacturer: Montenegro S.r.l.
- Origin: Italy
- Introduced: 1920
- Alcohol by volume: 17.5%
- Colour: Ruby red
- Website: www.selectaperitivo.it

Select is an Italian apéritif, created in 1920 in Venice by the distillery Fratelli Pilla & C. and currently produced by Gruppo Montenegro S.r.l. Select is commonly served in Venice with prosecco and soda water as the original Venetian spritz.

== History ==
The story of Select Aperitivo began when brothers Mario and Vittorio Pilla, eager to contribute to the rejuvenation of post-war Venice, founded Fratelli Pilla & C, a company specializing in liquor production. Select was created to be served on its own, with the addition of soda or seltzer, or mixed in many different cocktails. According to some, Venetians say a proper spritz veneziano is made with Select. In 1954 Select was acquired by Distilleria Jean Buton and later absorbed by Gruppo Montenegro, which still produces it to the original recipe.

== Liquid ==
The Select recipe blends together a secret recipe of 30 aromatic herbs and botanicals including juniper berries, for their balsamic and floral characteristics, and individually processed rhubarb roots, which provide intensely bitter notes for balance. The juniper berries undergo a special maceration and distillation process in a copper alembic still, giving Select Aperitivo its fresh and resinous notes. The resulting liquid is a deep ruby red. In Venice, the custom is to serve a Select spritz with soda and prosecco and garnish with a pit-in olive.

== Bottle ==
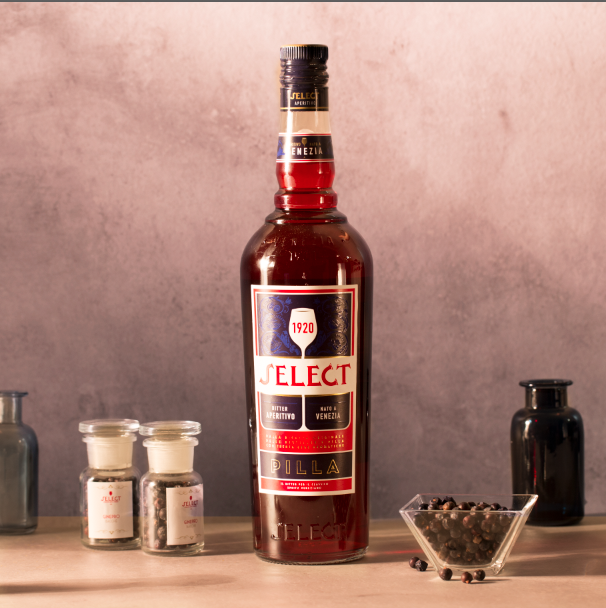
Bottle of Select

In 2018, the Select bottle was redesigned, drawing inspiration from the original label of the 1920’s and incorporating several references to its history, including the Venetian origin, the year of creation and the name of the Pilla Brothers. The new design also included the iconic long-stemmed glass that is the ultimate symbol of the Italian spritz.

== In popular culture ==
Select featured in several sketches produced for the Italian TV show Carosello. The most popular is the animation created by the Pagot brothers, pioneers in animation in Italian.

== See also ==
- Aperol
- Campari
- Spritz (cocktail)
