= Topo Chico =

Mexican mineral water brand

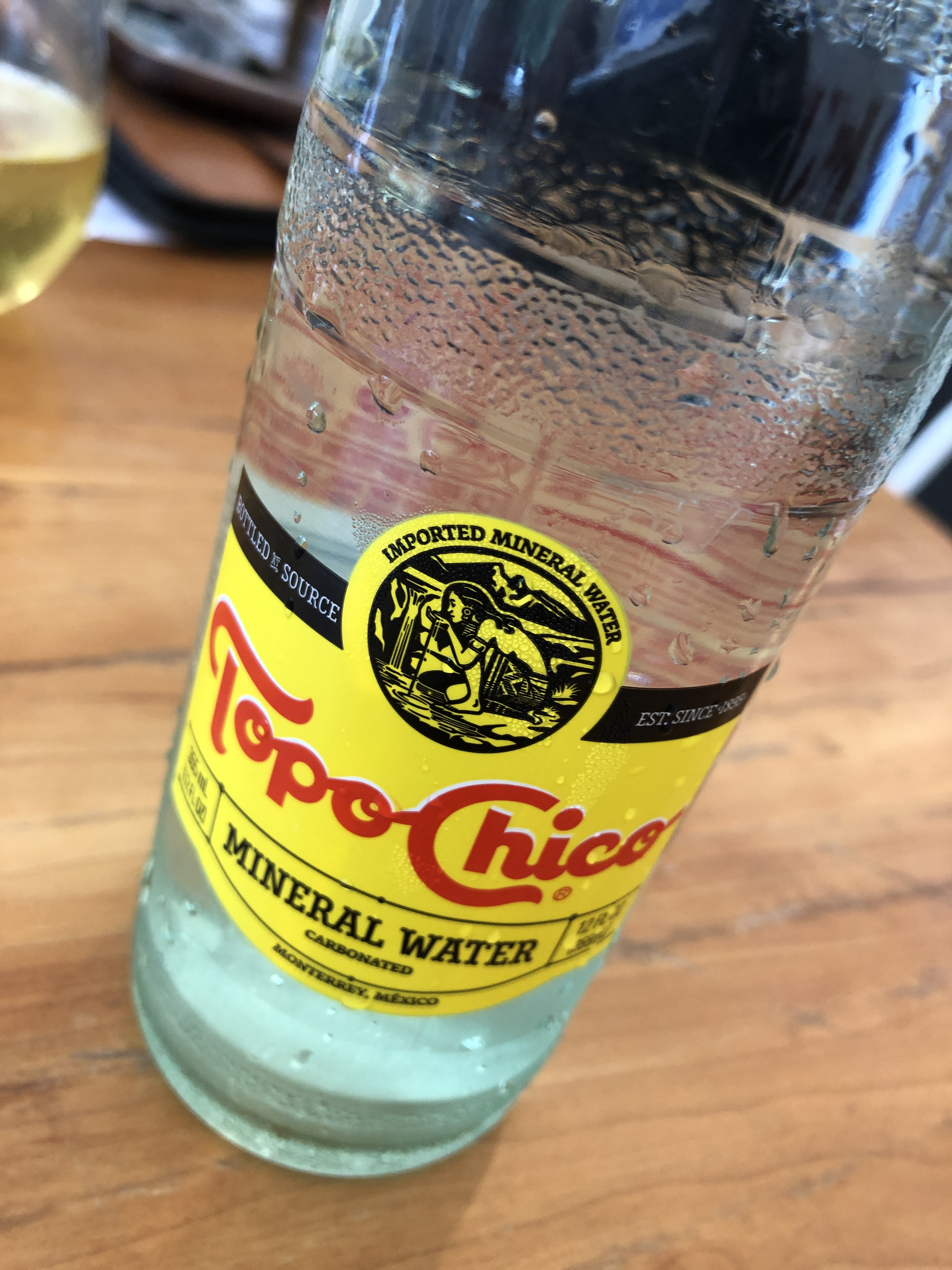
A glass bottle of Topo Chico

Topo-Chico is a brand of sparkling mineral water from Mexico. Topo-Chico is both naturally carbonated at the source and artificially carbonated.

== History ==
Topo-Chico has been sourced from and bottled in Monterrey, Mexico since 1895. The drink takes its name from the mountain Cerro del Topo Chico in Monterrey.

In 2017, the Coca-Cola Company purchased Topo-Chico for $220 million. The brand was originally popular in northern Mexico and Texas, with the Coca-Cola Company later helping popularize it across the United States. The drink has a cult following.

According to Consumer Reports, in 2020 Topo Chico sparkling water had PFAS measured at 9.76 ppt, the highest PFAS content of any brand. In 2021 Coca-Cola reduced the level of PFAS chemicals in Topo Chico mineral water, but levels are still above the maximum for bottled water recommended by experts.

=== 130th-anniversary bottles ===
The year 2025 marked Topo-Chico's 130th anniversary. As was done for the 125th anniversary in 2020, Topo Chico released a 12-pack of 12-ounce glass bottles with labels commemorating Topo Chico's past. In each 12-pack, every bottle has a "130 YEARS" sticker on the neck of the bottle, but the bottle's primary label is from a specific year: 1895, 1912, 1926, 1943, 1970, 2025. For the bottles with past labels, the year is indicated on the lower left corner of the label.

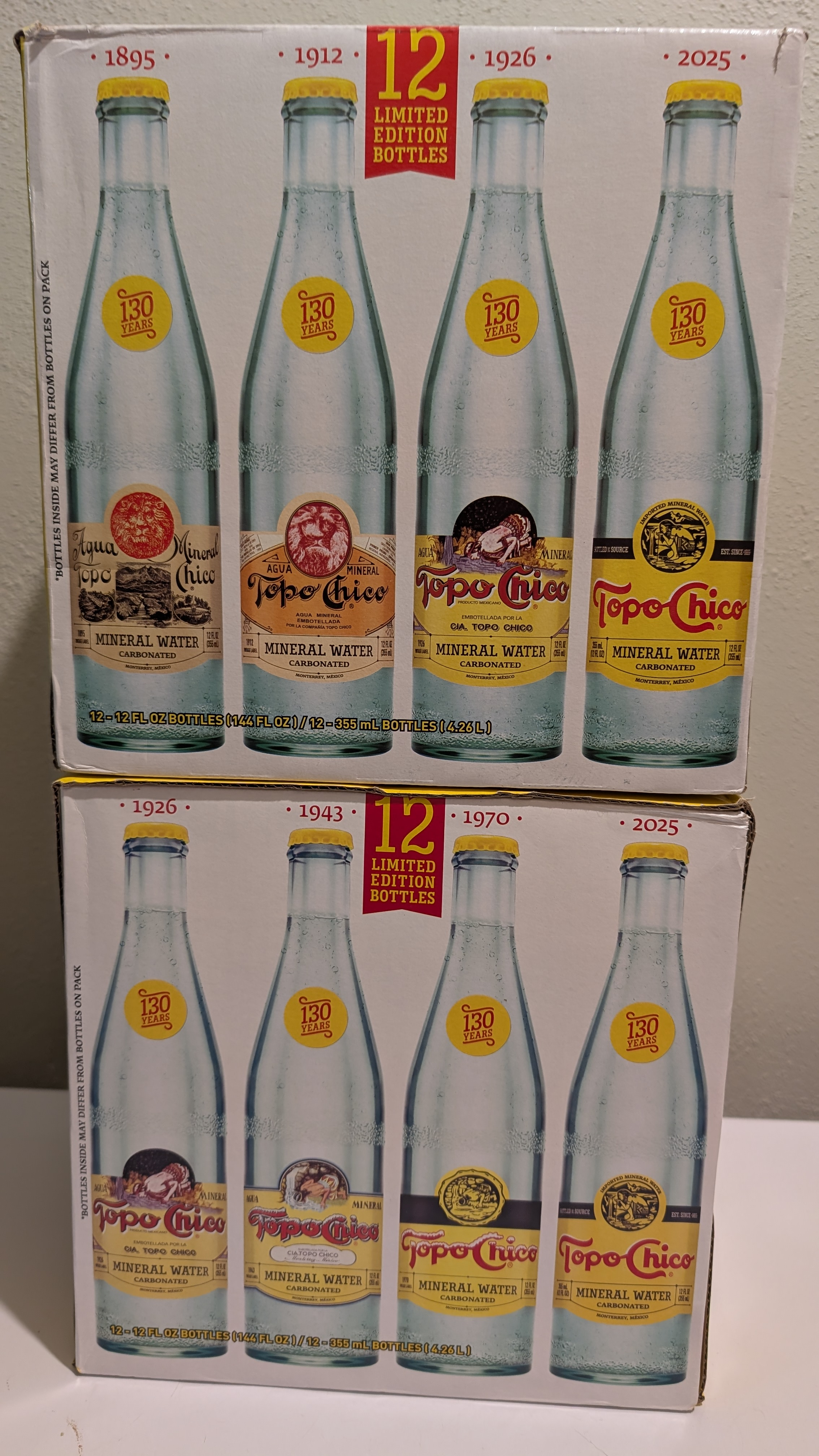
Topo Chico 12-oz 12-pack box of 130th Anniversary Bottles (1895, 1912, 1926, 1943, 1970, 2025).

== Cocktail ==
Ranch water is a cocktail made with tequila, lime juice and Topo-Chico, over ice, a popular drink in Texas. A similar drink, the Chilton, substitutes the lime for a lemon, the tequila for vodka, and adds salt on the rim. The drink allegedly derives its name from a doctor in Lubbock.

== Topo-Chico hard seltzer ==
In 2021, the Coca-Cola Co used its sparkling mineral water brand Topo-Chico to launch a range of vegan friendly alcoholic hard seltzers in the United Kingdom and in the United States with Molson Coors. The range includes Tangy Lemon Lime, Tropical Mango and Cherry Acai flavors in the United Kingdom and flavors such as Tangy Lemon Lime, Tropical Mango, Strawberry Guava and Exotic Pineapple in the US.

In early 2022, Topo Chico ranch water launched their new Hard Seltzer Topo Chico Ranch Water in select markets, along with the national rollout of its variety pack. The product is now available in stores across Alabama, Arizona, California, Colorado, Georgia, New Mexico, Oklahoma, Tennessee, and Texas.

Neither Topo Chico Hard Seltzer nor Topo Chico Ranch Water are made with mineral water from the original Topo Chico spring. Rather, they are “inspired by the taste” of the original drink.

=== Legal issues ===
In 2023, a New York resident sued Coca-Cola because its Topo Chico Margarita Hard Seltzers do not contain tequila and cited that the product's packaging was misleading about the contents of the beverage. The lawsuit was dismissed later that year. In 2024, a Florida resident brought a similar suit against Coca-Cola, also citing that the product's packaging includes "false and misleading representations and omissions" suggesting that the product contains tequila.

== See also ==
- List of bottled water brands
- List of Coca-Cola brands
