= Italicus Rosolio di Bergamotto =

Italian liqueur

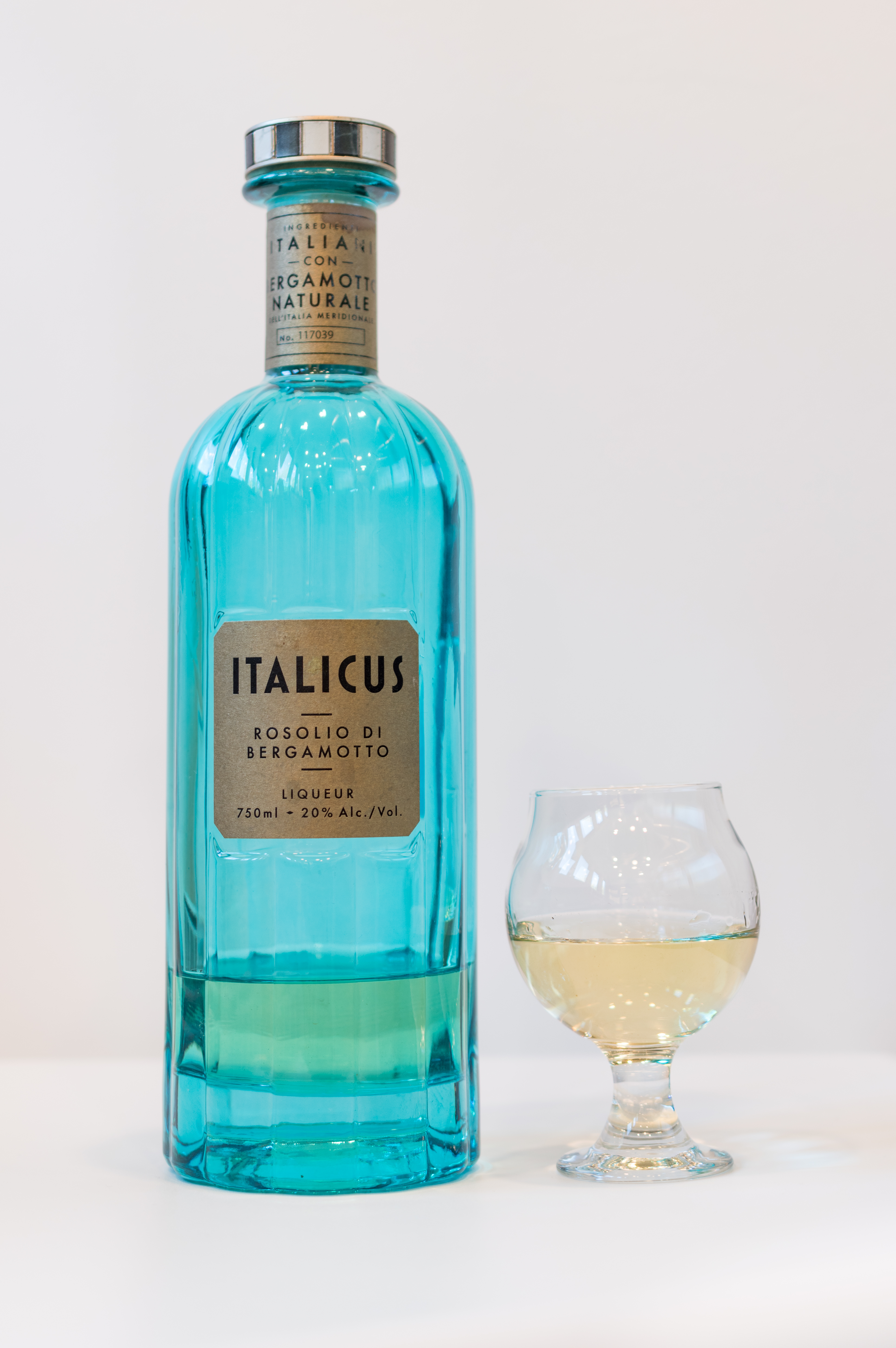
- Type: Liqueur; aperitivo; rosolio
- Manufacturer: Torino Distillati
- Distributor: Pernod Ricard
- Introduced: 2016
- Alcohol by volume: 20%
- Ingredients: Bergamot, citron, chamomile, lavender, yellow rose, lemon balm, gentian
- Website: rosolioitalicus.com

Italicus Rosolio di Bergamotto is a bergamot rosolio (a type of aperitivo) manufactured in Italy. The liqueur uses bergamot from Calabria and citrons from Sicily, along with Italian flower varieties. Italicus was created by an Italian bartender, Giuseppe Gallo, using a family recipe. He launched the spirit commercially in September 2016.

== Attributes ==
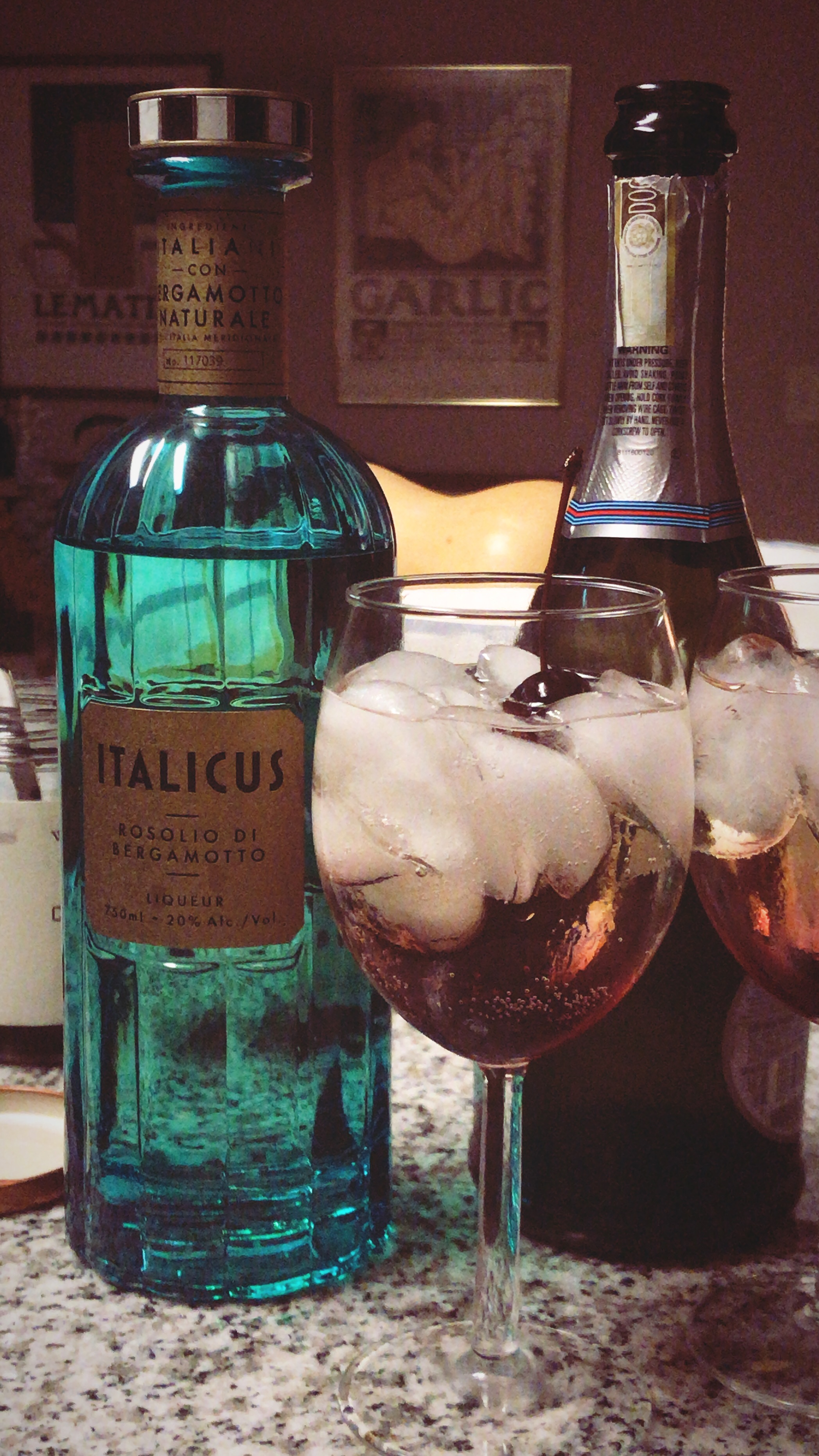
A spritz made with Italicus

Italicus uses Calabrian bergamot oranges, Sicilian citrons, chamomile from Lazio, and herbs from northern Italy: lavender, yellow roses, lemon balm, and gentian. It is classified as a type of rosolio, a light, sweet, and floral aperitivo traditionally made using the common sundew herb. The recipe for Italicus includes the creator's family tradition of adding citrus to the liqueur.

The spirit has a fragrant smell, of citrus, bergamot, herbal bitterness, and the suggestion of sweetness. It tastes similar, of citrus, grass, and flowers, with sweetness and some bitterness. The unaged, nonvintage spirit is 20 percent alcohol by volume.

Italicus is produced at Torino Distillati, a family-owned distillery in Moncalieri (near Turin) established in 1906. It is bottled in an aquamarine-colored bottle made of ribbed glass, and colored to represent the Amalfi Coast. The bottle's stopper shows a figure made to represent both Bacchus, Roman god of wine, and the Vitruvian Man.

== History ==
Giuseppe Gallo, an Italian bartender, developed the spirit in 2016 after learning about rosolios. His basis for the liqueur was his family's own generations-old recipe. The product was introduced at the Savoy Hotel in London on September 1, 2016.

In 2017, the liqueur won the "best new spirit/cocktail ingredient" category at Tales of the Cocktail in New Orleans.

Italicus has been in partnership with Pernod Ricard since 2020. In 2021, Italicus helped finance the reopening of several London bars following the COVID-19 pandemic, alongside a promotion of Italicus and its use in cocktails.

== See also ==
- List of liqueur brands
