= Campari =

Italian bitter

- Logo
- Type: Bitters
- Manufacturer: Campari Group
- Origin: Italy
- Alcohol by volume: 20.5–28.5%
- Proof (US): 42–57
- Colour: Carmine
- Flavour: Bitter, spicy and sweet
- Website: campari.com

Campari (Italian: [kamˈpaːri]) is an Italian alcoholic liqueur, considered an apéritif of the bitter variety (and not an amaro) by Italians, while considered an apéritif of the amaro variety by Americans, obtained from the infusion of herbs and fruit (including chinotto and cascarilla) in alcohol and water. It is a type of bitters, characterised by its dark red colour. It is produced by the Campari Group, a multinational company based in Italy.

== History ==
Campari was invented in 1860 by Gaspare Campari in Novara, Italy. It was originally colored with carmine dye, derived from crushed cochineal insects, giving the drink its distinctive red color. Campari Group discontinued the use of carmine in 2006.

In 1904, Campari opened its first production plant in Sesto San Giovanni, near Milan, Italy. Under the direction of Davide Campari, Gaspare's son, the company began exporting the beverage first to Nice on the French Riviera, then overseas.

The Campari brand is now distributed in over 190 countries. Campari is a registered trademark of Davide Campari Milano S.P.A., which is part of Gruppo Campari (Campari Group).

== Use ==
Campari is often used in cocktails and is commonly served with soda water or citrus juice (most often pink grapefruit juice), often garnished with either a blood orange or blood lime slice (mainly in Australia) or mixed with prosecco as a spritz.

Campari is an essential ingredient in several IBA official cocktails (of which Campari is a sponsor): the negroni, the Americano (which was named at a time when few Americans were aware of Campari), the boulevardier, and the old pal (removed from IBA list in 1987), as well as other drinks such as the Garibaldi. It is a common ingredient in spritzes, though other apéritif bitters are also common.

In the Italian market, Campari mixed with soda water is sold in individual bottles as Campari Soda (10% alcohol by volume). Campari Soda is packaged in a distinctive bottle that was designed by Italian artist Fortunato Depero in 1932.

== Ratings ==
Wine Enthusiast has reviewed Campari on several occasions, giving it a score of "96/100" in 2023.

== Gallery ==
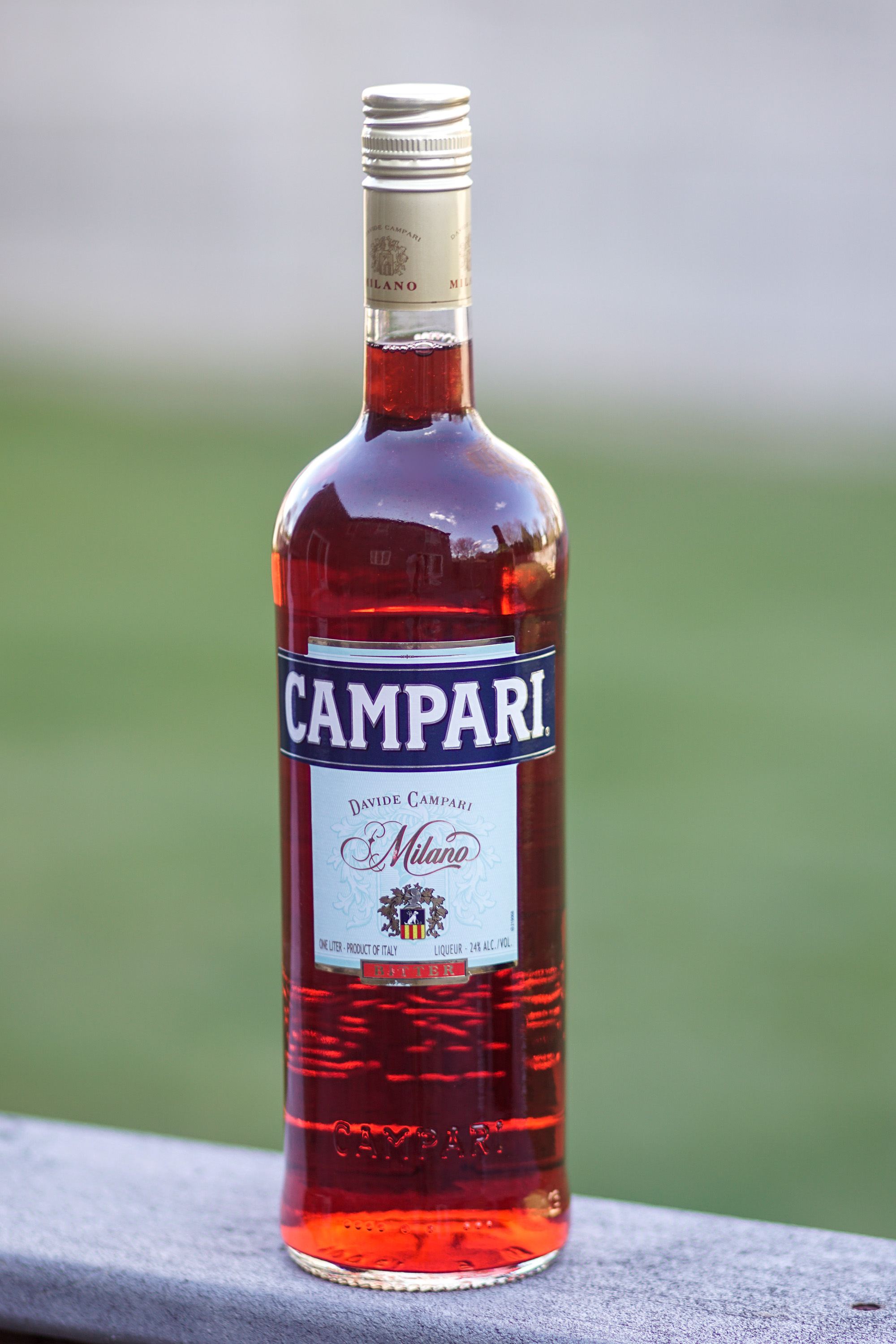
Bottle of Campari

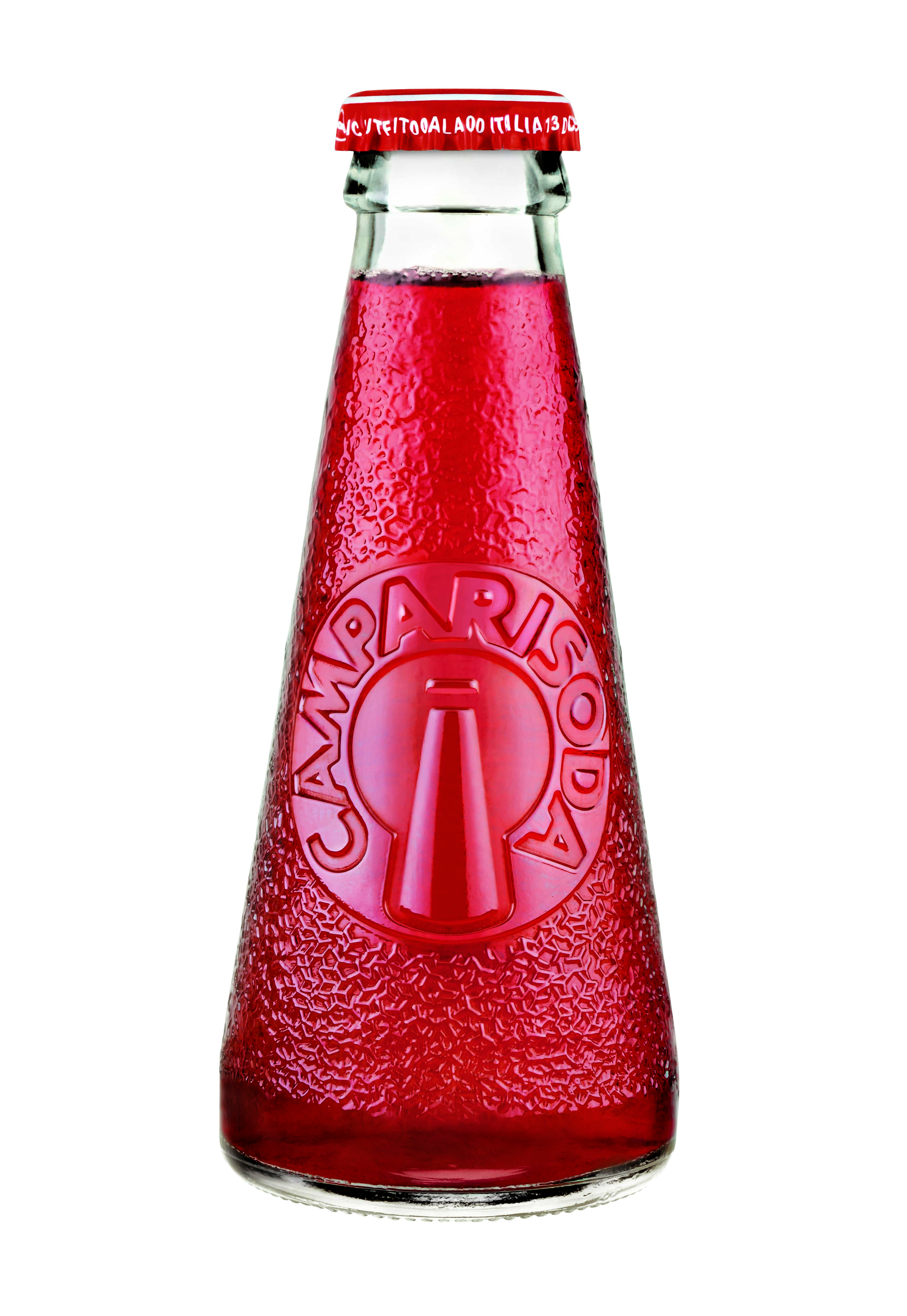
Campari soda

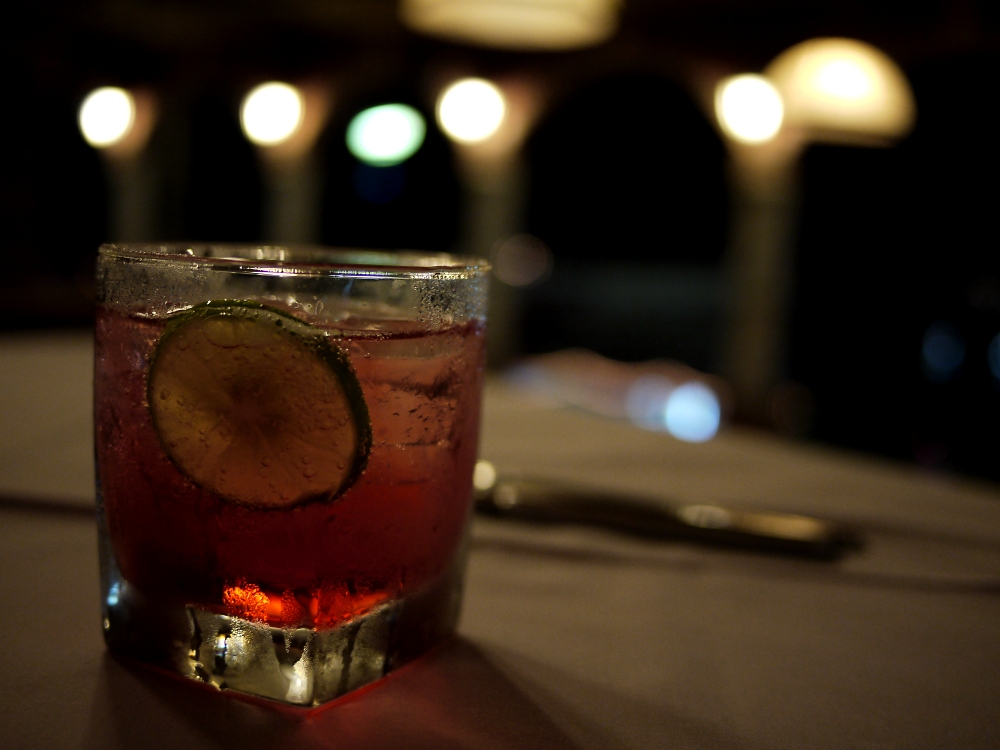
Campari soda

== See also ==
- Aperol
- Cinzano
- Cynar
- Fernet
- Select
