= Prosecco, Friuli-Venezia Giulia =

Village in Italy

Prosecco Prosek (Slovene)
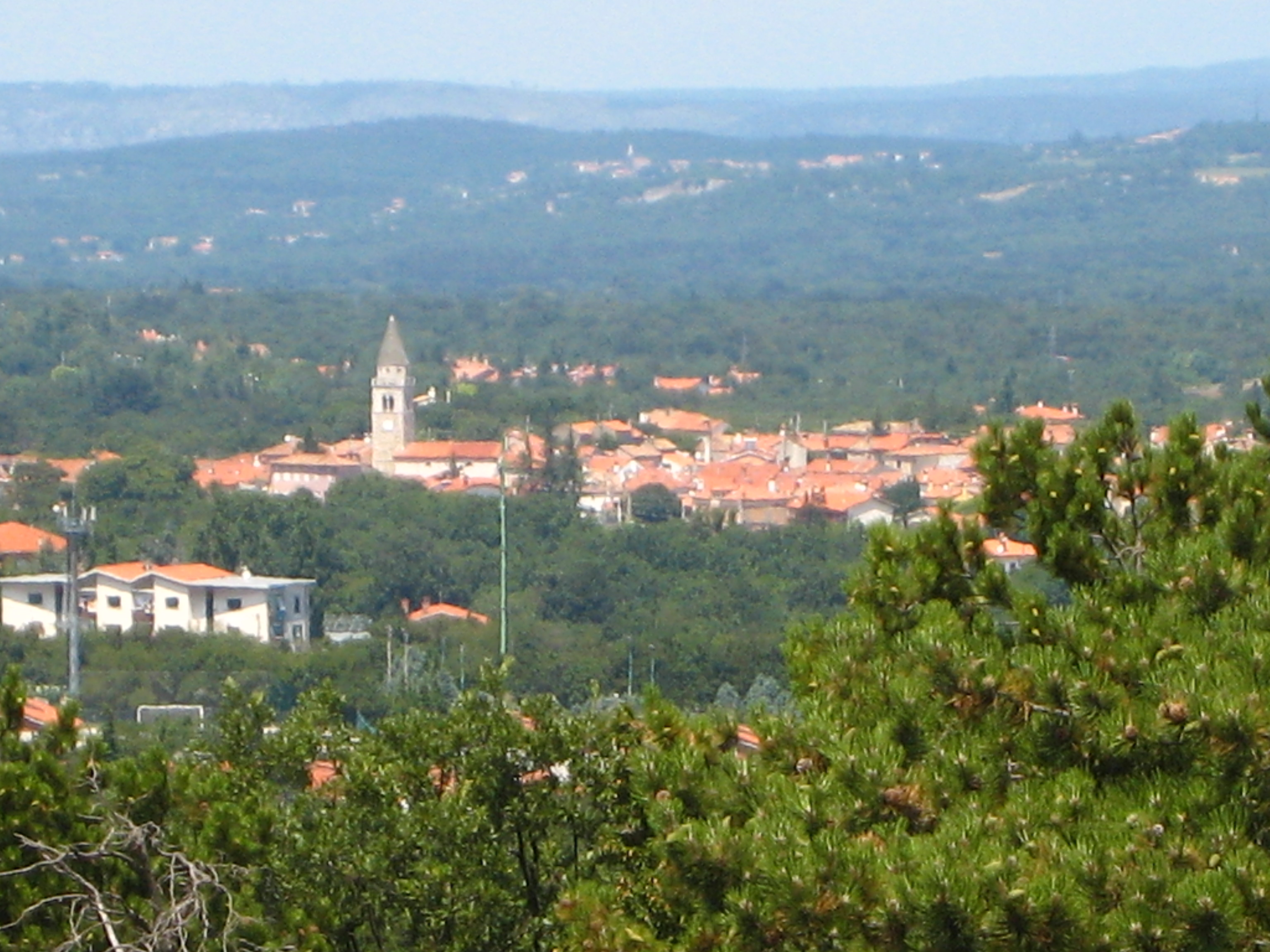

- Location within Italy Location within Friuli-Venezia Giulia
- Coordinates: 45°42′27″N 13°44′01″E
- Country: Italy
- Region: Friuli-Venezia Giulia
- Municipality: Trieste

Population (2011)
  - Total: 1,349
- Postal code: 34151
- Area code: 040

Prosecco (Italian: [proˈsekko]; Slovene: Prosek) is a village near the city of Trieste, Italy. It is best known for giving the name to the wine Prosecco. It lies 249 metres (817 feet) above sea level.

== Name ==
Prosecco was attested in written sources in 1308 as Prossecho (and as Prosec in 1372, Prossegk in 1421, and Proseck and Prosseck in 1494). The name is of Slovene origin, derived from the dialect common noun prosek 'path cut through the woods' (cf. standard Slovene preseka or poseka, standard Serbian/Croatian is pros(j)ek). The wine Prosecco was named after the village, and this wine name was later borrowed from Italian into Slovene and Croatian as prošek.

== Population ==
The population in the central area of the locality is still mainly Slovene; it was 92% Slovene before the annexation of Austrian Littoral to Italy in 1920 and subsequent Italianization. The newer part of the locality known as Borgo San Nazario, built in the 1950s and 1960s, is mainly inhabited by Istrian Italians who left Istria after the end of World War II.
