= Ranch water =

Tequila based cocktail

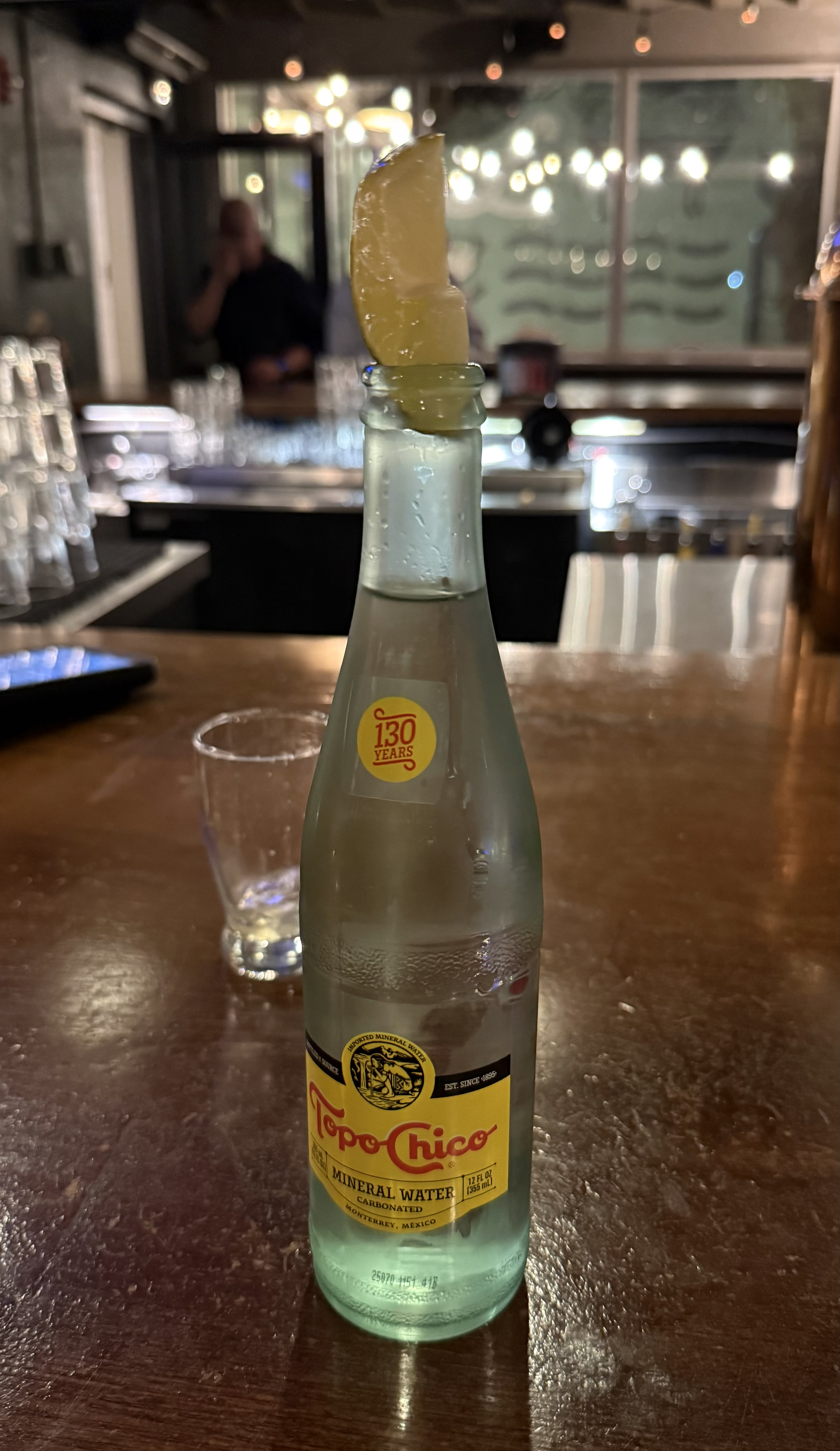
- Type: Cocktail
- Ingredients: Lime juice, Topo Chico or other sparkling water
- Base spirit: Tequila
- Standard drinkware: Collins glass

Ranch water is a cocktail typically made with tequila, lime juice, and Topo Chico sparkling mineral water. It originates in Texas, often traced to an Austin restaurant that opened in 1998.

There are various stories about its origin. Many attribute the drink to Kevin Williamson, an Austin restaurant owner, who drank a similar mixture as a young man while hunting with his father. In 1998, he opened a restaurant with ranch water, a margarita with Topo Chico on the side, which patrons could mix to taste. Some recipes include orange liqueur, like margaritas do. The historic Gage Hotel in Marathon, Texas, with which Williamson has worked, also serves ranch water.

Various companies, especially Texas-based ones, market canned ranch waters, often labeled hard seltzers. Topo Chico's hard seltzer line includes a ranch water. Some US beer brewers have begun producing ranch water using a malt base, allowing them to bypass licensing requirements for distillers, in light of increasing consumer appetite for prepackaged cocktails and declining beer sales. The lack of tequila in canned versions has led to backlash from fans of the drink, and a class action lawsuit against Dos Equis claiming false advertising due to a lack of tequila and lime juice in their version.

== See also ==
- Spaghett
