= Sgroppino =

Alcoholic mixed drink

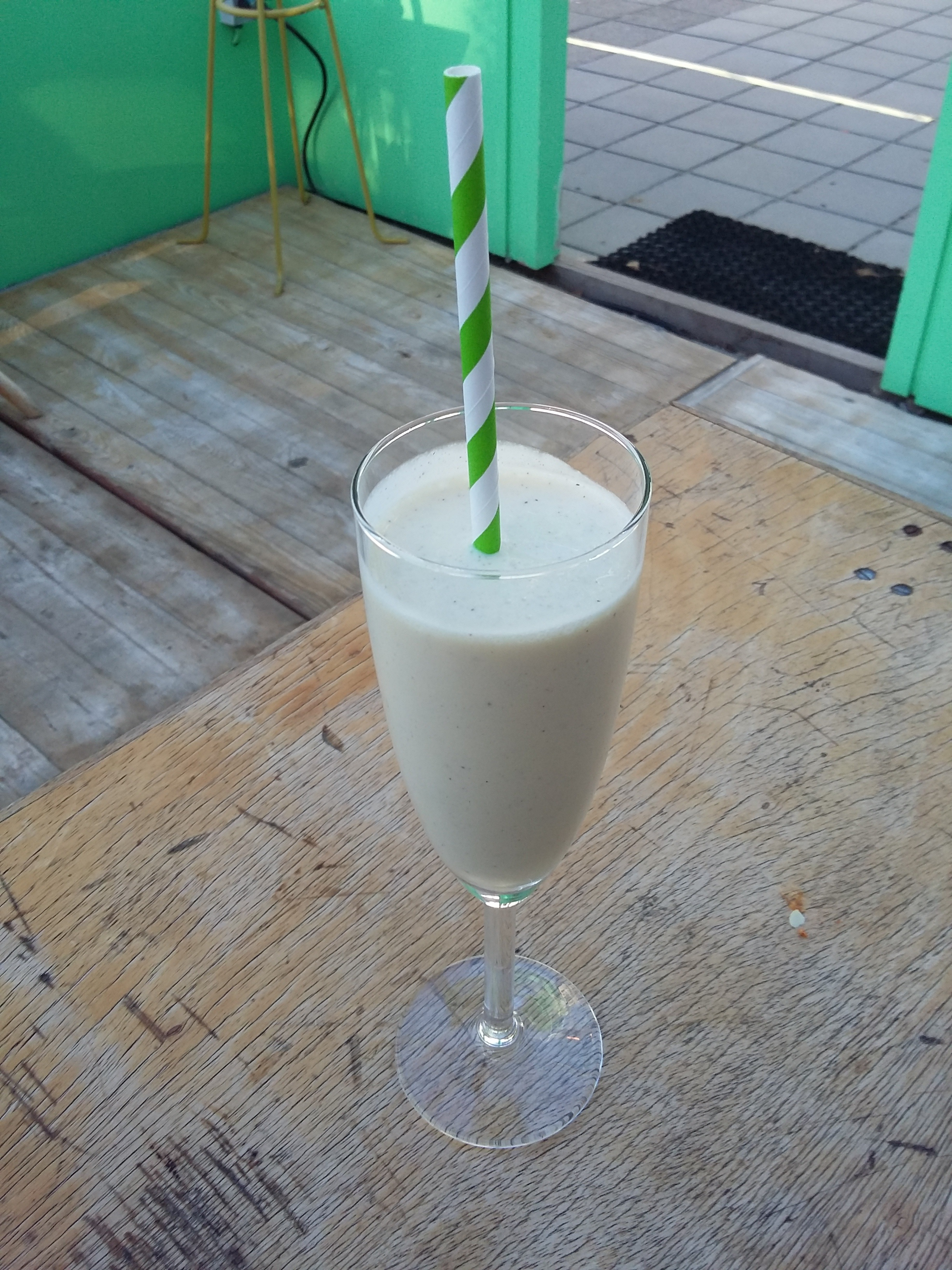
A glass of sgroppino

Sgroppino is an alcoholic mixed drink originating in Venice, Italy, based on sorbetto al limone with Prosecco and/or vodka.

== See also ==
- Prosecco
- Vodka
