= Rosolio =

Type of Italian liqueur

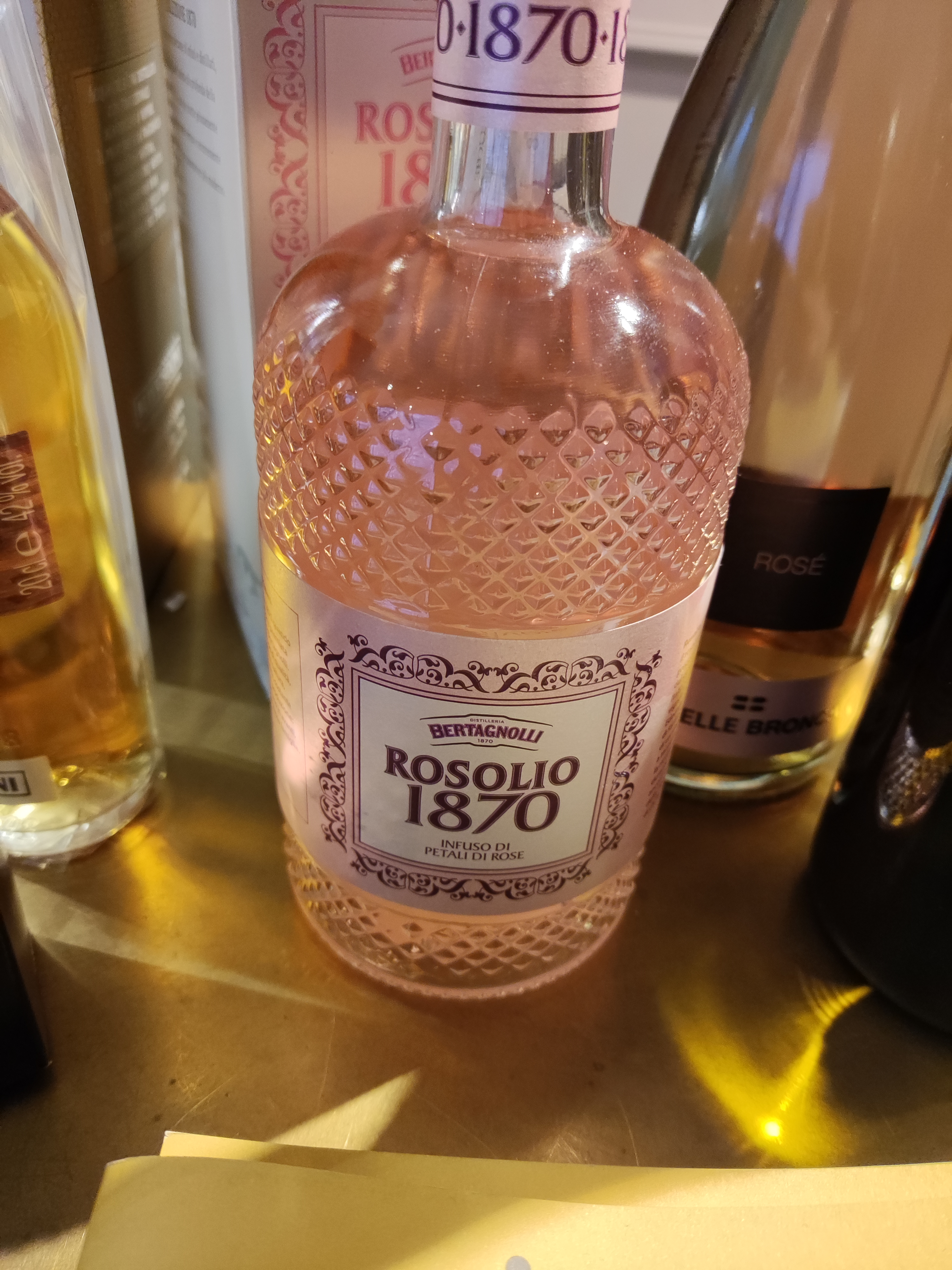
A bottle of rosolio

Rosolio is a type of Italian liqueur made from a base of alcohol, sugar, and water in the same proportion, which is flavored by adding an essence of any of various types.

Despite a common misconception based on the name, rosolio has no direct connection with roses or rose petals (rose essence is, however, one option for addition to the base; other options include citrus, coffee, aniseed, and mint). In fact, the name comes from the Latin ros solis, which means 'dew of the sun': Drosera rotundifolia.

The liqueur is common in Piedmont and in southern Italy. It enjoys a special popularity in Sicily, where it has been prepared since the sixteenth century and was offered to house guests as a sign of good luck.

== Etymology ==
Zingarelli's Vocabulary of the Italian Language (Vocabolario della Lingua Italiana) defines rosolio as "liqueur prepared with alcohol, sugar and water in the same proportion, plus an essence that gives it its name": therefore, rose rosolio, mint rosolio, etc. The etymology that he attributes to it is that of ros solis; that is, dew of sunshine. Drosera and rosolida come from the Greek meaning covered with dew, in fact the sundews seem to be covered with dew. With Drosera rotundifolia L. the pharmacopoeia made an elixir called ros solis, originally from Dalmatia. The word ros solis developed into rosolio, interpreted as a liqueur made with roses. Consequently, the petals of roses are of little use in defining the name.

== History ==
The production of rosolio most likely started in the Middle Ages, as the use of distilled liqueurs for curative purposes dates back to the 1300s or 1400s. Rosolio was mainly produced in convents and monasteries where nuns and monks would macerate various local botanicals in order to have a delicate, yet flavourful drink to offer to important guests. However, the liqueur would also be produced in private homes all around Italy (mainly in the regions of Piedmont, Sicily and Campania), making it so that the herbs and flowers used would vary according to the regional availability.

In 1533, during the reing of the House of Medici, the variant of Alkermes Rosolio became popular in Florence, and the drink was even introduced to France after the marriage between Catherine de' Medici and Henry II of Orléans.

However, under the Kingdom of Savoy, the popularity of rosolio declined especially in Piedmont, in favour of an increased production of vermouth, made with locally produced grapes.

Over the decades, new versions of rosolio kept being created. In his book Science in the kitchen and the art of eating well, Pellegrino Artusi described the recipe of four types that were popular at the time, while Italo Ghersi listed 55 different types in his Il Liquorista hadbook in 1921.

== Preparation ==
Rosolio refers to a whole category of botanical liqueurs with a similar preparation method but with different final flavour profiles. The base of the preparation is alcohol, water and sugar in equal parts.

For the classic preparation, rose petals are stored in a jar with sugar until the latter has dissolved and it has been absorbed by the petals. Alcohol is then added to the mixture, which is left to macerate for at least a week. Finally, water is added and the liqueur is strained and stored away for at least two weeks before being consumed.

Alternatively, the petals can be macerated in alcohol to obtain a liquid which is then diluted with a mix of water and sugar. This procedure is preferable when using other ingredients for the essence. Various types of botanicals can be used to prepare rosolio, including orange, lemon or bergamot peel, lavender, fennel, sage, aniseed, cinnamon, berries and many more.

Regardless of the botanicals used, the final result is a floral and sweet liqueur with an alcoholic content of 20% to 30%.

== See also ==
- Italicus
- List of liqueur brands
