= Spritz (cocktail) =

Italian wine-based cocktail

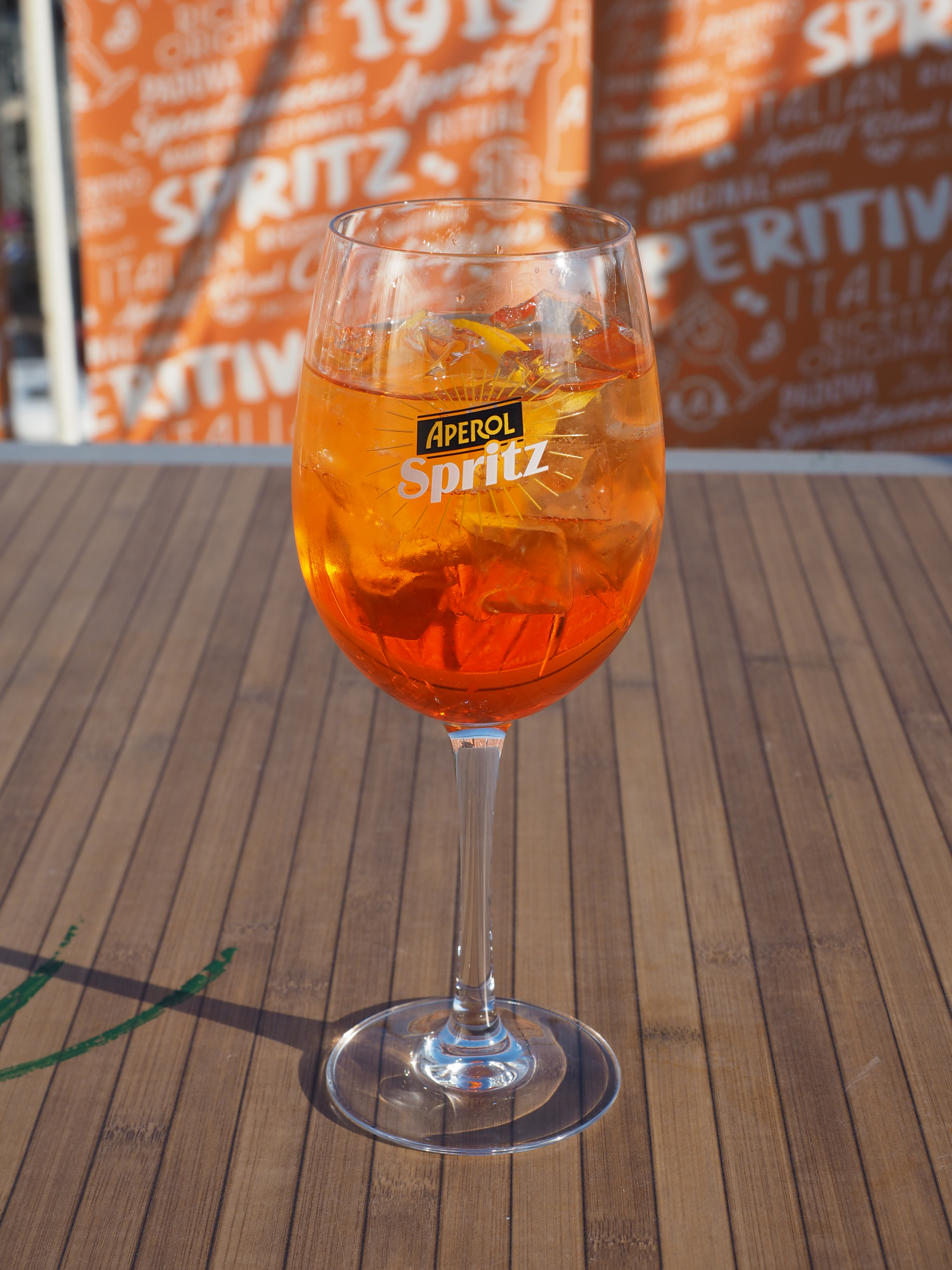
- An Aperol spritz
- Type: Wine cocktail
- Ingredients: 9 cL Prosecco; 6 cL Select/Aperol/Campari/Cynar; Splash of soda water
- Base spirit: Prosecco
- Standard drinkware: Wine glass (white)
- Standard garnish: Slice of Orange
- Served: On the rocks: poured over ice
- Preparation: Build all ingredients into a wine glass filled with ice. Stir gently.

A spritz is an Italian wine-based cocktail, commonly served as an apéritif across Italy. It consists of Prosecco, a mixer (usually soda water), and a flavouring ingredient, which can be a bitter liqueur, a bitter apéritif, an amaro or a syrup. The original spritz veneziano (Italian: [ˈsprits venetˈtsjaːno]) uses the bitter apéritif Select as its flavouring ingredient and was created in Venice in 1920. Popular variants include the Aperol spritz, Martini vermouth spritz, Campari spritz, and Cynar spritz, which use Aperol, Campari, and Cynar as flavouring ingredients.

Since 2011, the spritz has been an IBA official cocktail, initially listed as "spritz veneziano" then simply as "spritz". The spritz became widely popular outside of Italy in the 2010s and Aperol spritz was ranked as the world's ninth bestselling cocktail in 2019 by the website Drinks International.

National Spritz Day is celebrated annually on the 1st August.

== History ==
Spritz was created during the period of the Habsburg domination in Veneto in the 1800s, under the Kingdom of Lombardy–Venetia. The soldiers, but also the various merchants, diplomats, and employees of the Habsburg Empire in Veneto became quickly accustomed to drinking local wine in the taverns, but they were not familiar with the wide variety of wines from the Veneto, and the alcohol content was higher than they were accustomed to. The newcomers started to ask the local hosts to spray (German: spritzen) a drop of water into the wine to make the wines lighter; the real original spritz was composed of sparkling white wine or red wine diluted with fresh water.

Between the 1920s and 1930s, in Venice or in Padua, spritz was combined with local bitter aperitifs (typically drunk with soda and ice). Aperol was born in Padua in 1919 and Select in Venice in 1920. The original recipe has supposedly remained unchanged over time, but it was not until the 1970s that the modern spritz recipe was set, with Prosecco instead of still wine. Over the years the drink has "grown up" with a variety of possible additions, such as a sort of liquor or a bitter as the China Martini or Cynar with a lemon peel inside.

== Recipe ==
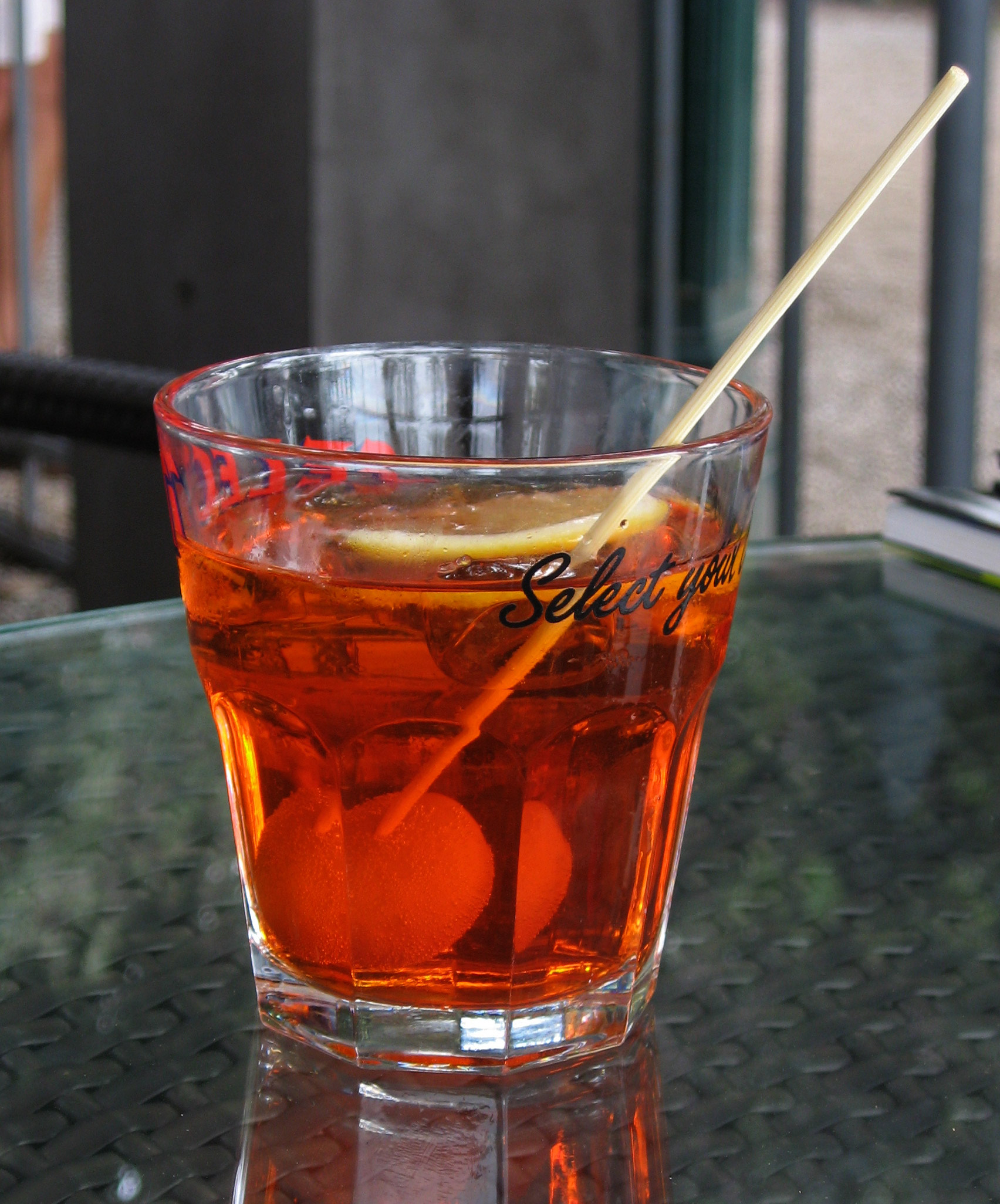
An Aperol spritz, served in Venice

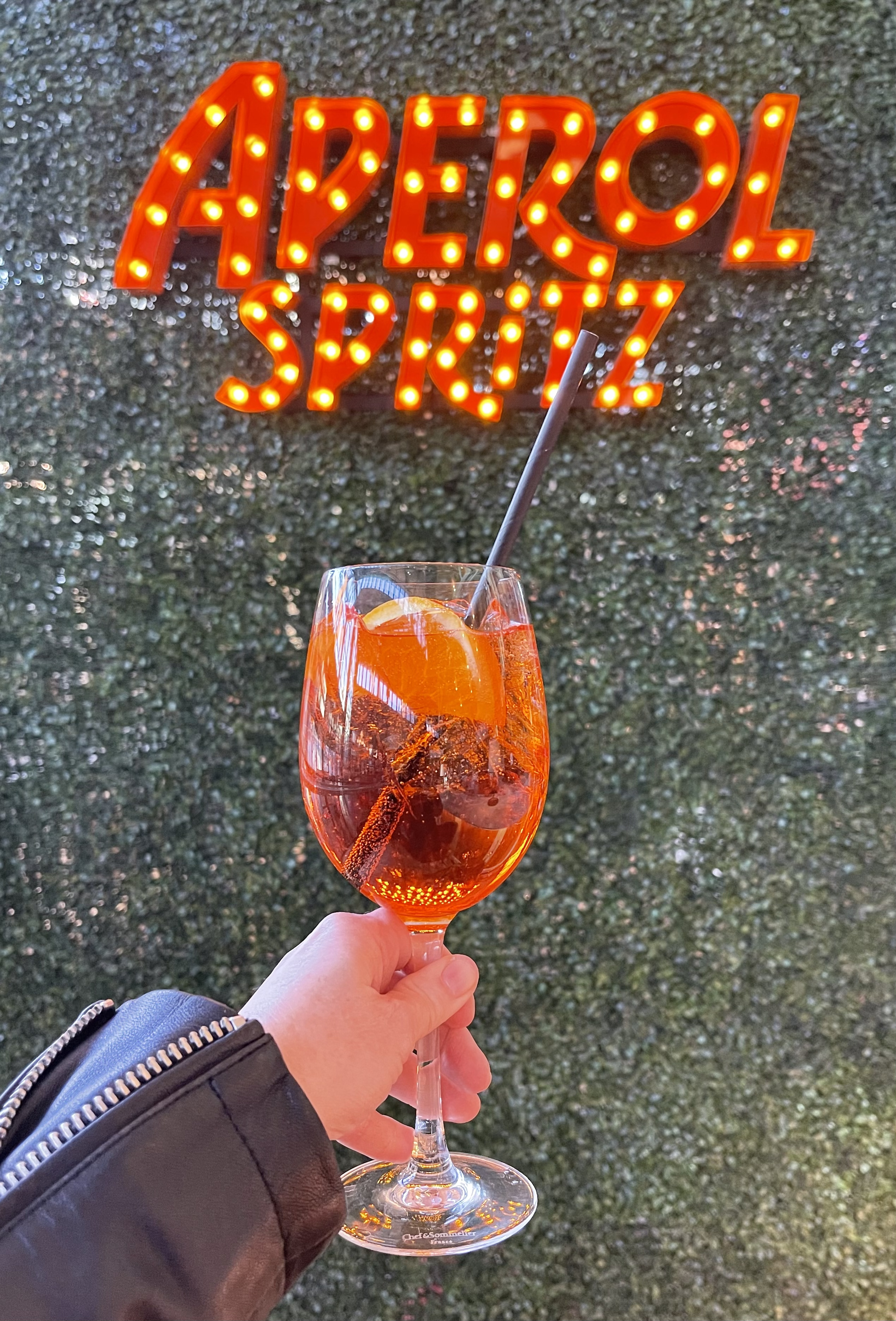
An Aperol spritz at Eataly in Las Vegas

Generally, the drink is prepared with Prosecco wine, bitter liqueur such as Aperol, Campari, Cynar or, especially in Venice, Aperitivo Select, then the glass is topped off with a dash of sparkling mineral water (more commonly club soda). It is usually served with ice in a wine or rocks glass and garnished with a slice of orange, or sometimes an olive, depending on the liqueur.

Original Venetian spritz includes:

- 7.5 cL Prosecco;
- 5 cL Select;
- 2.5 cL soda water;
- one large green olive.

Spritz includes:

- 1/3 sparkling white wine (usually Prosecco)
- 1/3 bitters (Select, Aperol or Campari);
- 1/3 sparkling or soda water.

IBA's official recipe includes:

- 9 cL Prosecco;
- 6 cL Aperol
- Splash of soda water.

There is no single composition for a spritz; it is prepared with different ingredients in different towns and cities, so the alcohol content is highly variable. A common denominator is the presence of sparkling white wine and water, with the rest made up of a wide variety of alcoholic drinks, sometimes mixed, but with an unwritten rule to preserve the red/orange color of the cocktail. Finally, a slice of lemon, a slice of orange, or an olive, and a few ice cubes are added.

== Variations ==
- Spritz bianco (lit. 'white spritz') – made by white still wine and sparkling water, as the ancient spritzer; it is mostly used in Friuli-Venezia Giulia.
- Istrian Aperol spritz – uses teranino (a liqueur made from Teran wine from Istria, Croatia) instead of Prosecco.
- Italicus spritz – uses Italicus Rosolio di Bergamotto, a bergamot orange-based liqueur.
- Pirlo – an aperitivo from the city of Brescia, which probably developed in parallel with Venetian spritz and instead uses still white wine.

== See also ==
- Media related to Spritz at Wikimedia Commons
- List of cocktails
