= Prosecco =

Italian white wine

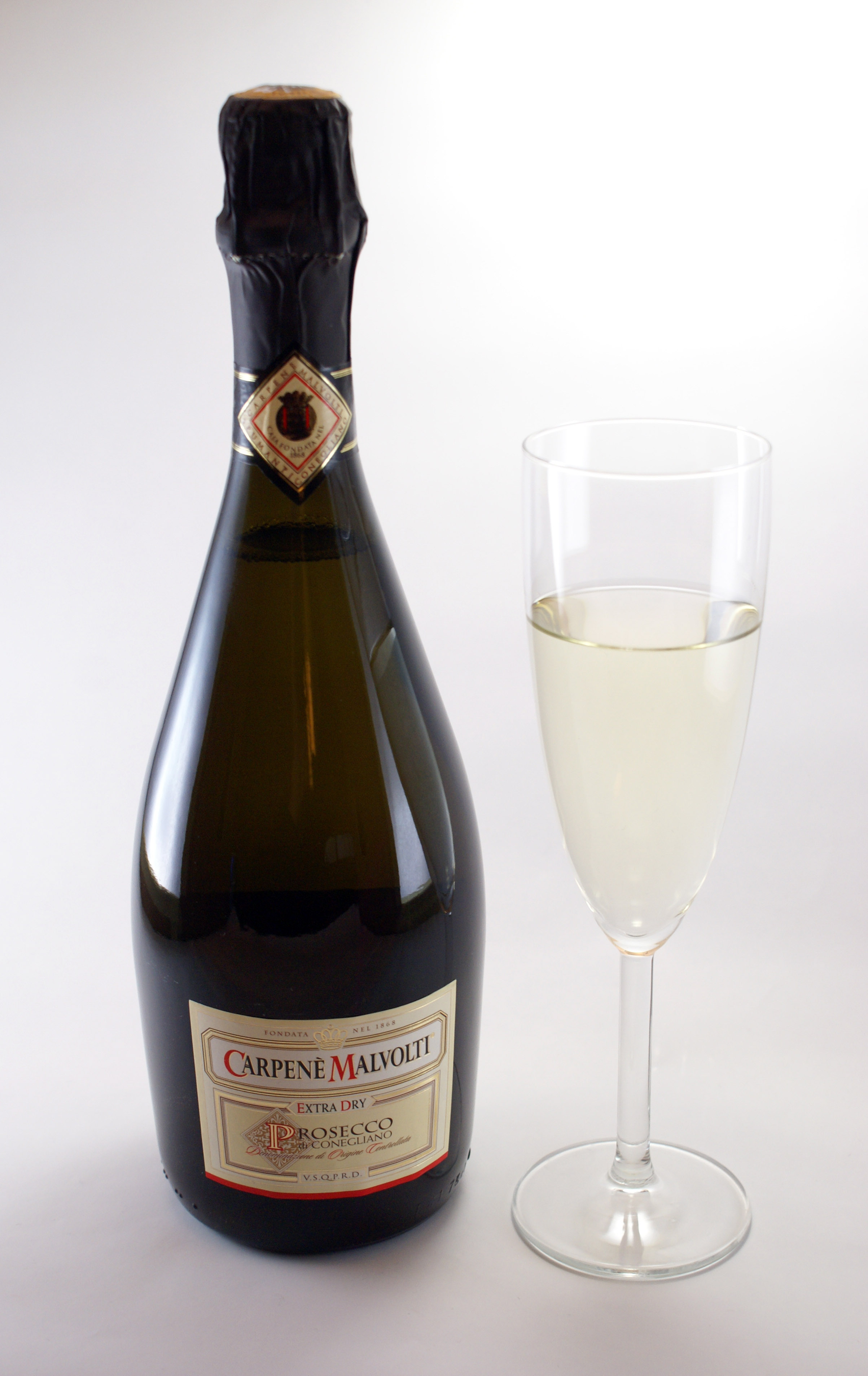
A bottle of Prosecco di Conegliano spumante extra dry and a glass of Prosecco frizzante, which stops forming bubbles soon after it is poured

Prosecco (/prəˈsɛkoʊ, proʊ-/, Italian: [proˈsekko]) is an Italian DOC or DOCG white wine produced in a large area spanning nine provinces in the Veneto and Friuli-Venezia Giulia regions, and named after the village of Prosecco, in the province of Trieste, Italy. It is made from the Prosecco grape (renamed "Glera" in Italy in 2009), but denomination rules allow up to 15% of the wine to be other permitted varieties. Prosecco is almost always made in sparkling or semi-sparkling style (spumante and frizzante, respectively), but a still wine (tranquillo) is also permitted. Within the larger designation are two small DOCG areas, Conegliano Valdobbiadene Prosecco in the hills between the comuni (municipalities) of Conegliano and Valdobbiadene, and Asolo Prosecco around the nearby comune of Asolo. Prosecco Superiore is always spumante and comes only from these DOCG areas.

In 2019, Le Colline del Prosecco di Conegliano e Valdobbiadene (Conegliano and Valdobbiadene Prosecco Hills) became a UNESCO World Heritage Site, in large part due to the region's role in the production of Prosecco. Since 2020, the DOC rules allow a rosé variety of Prosecco designated spumante rosé, which must contain Glera blended with 10–15% Pinot nero.

== History ==
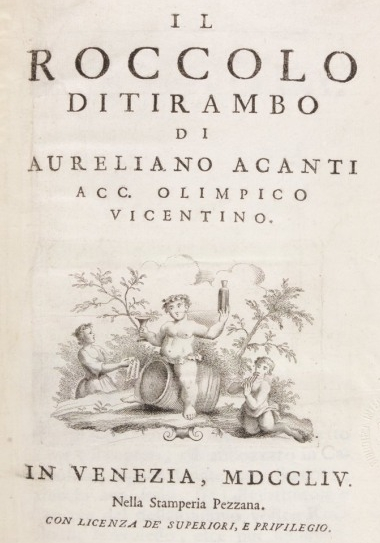
The cover of the book Il Roccolo Ditirambo (1754), containing for the first time the exact word Prosecco

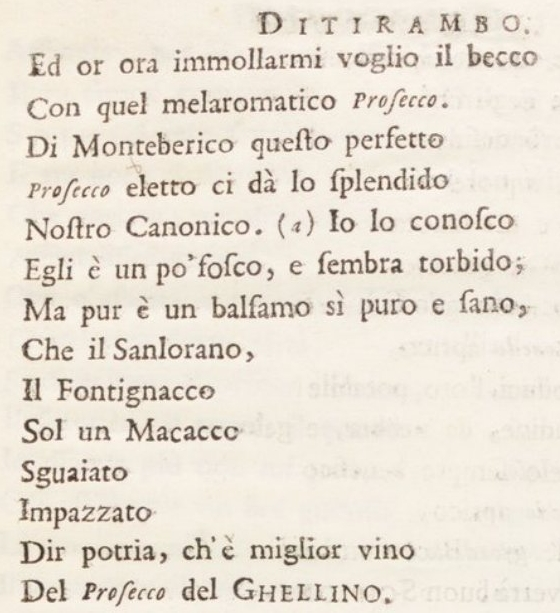
The poem where the term Prosecco appears for the first time within Il Roccolo Ditirambo (1754), growing on the hill of Monte Berico in Vicenza

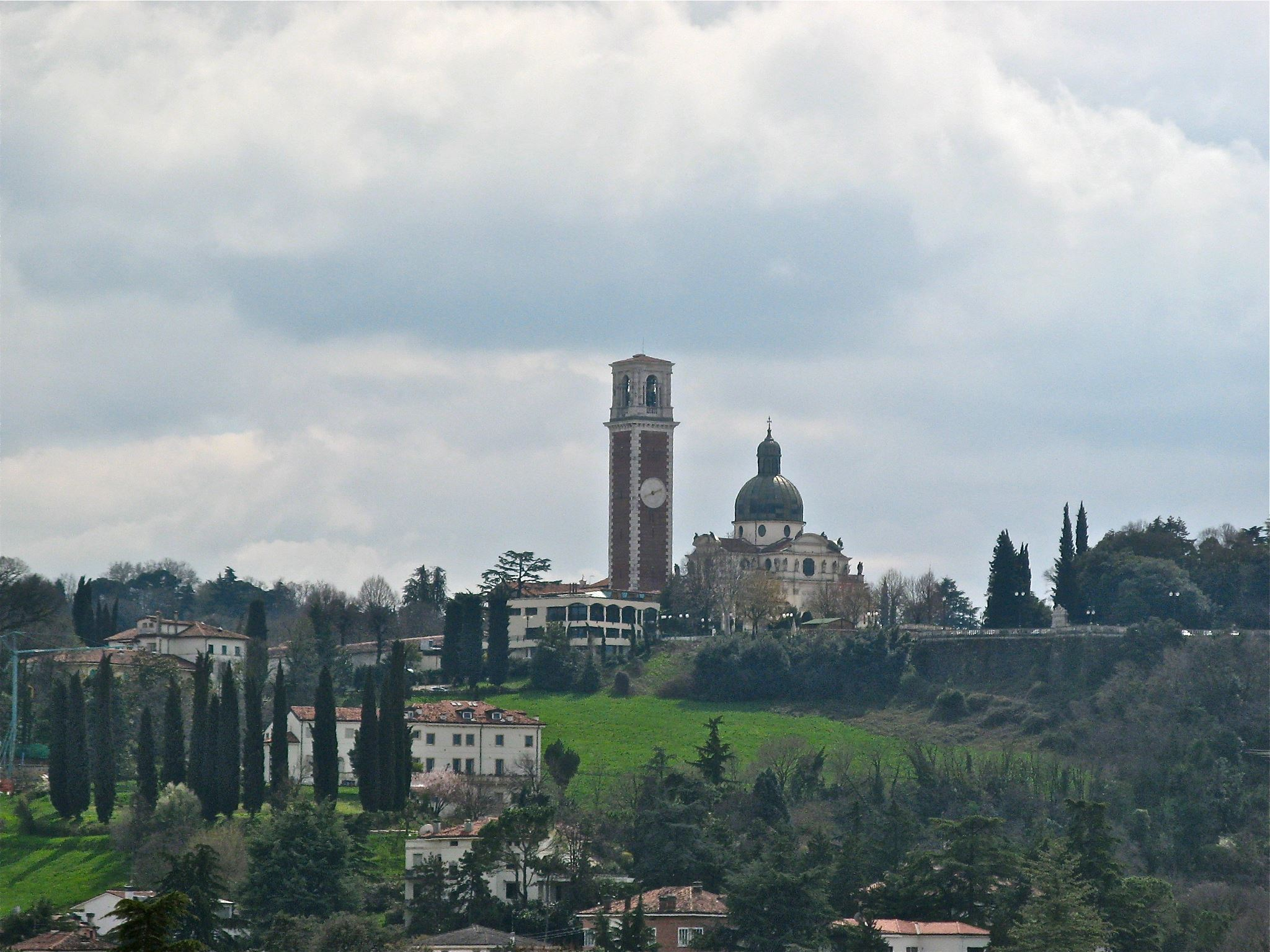
Monte Berico's hill in Vicenza (UNESCO), where the first described prosecco was growing

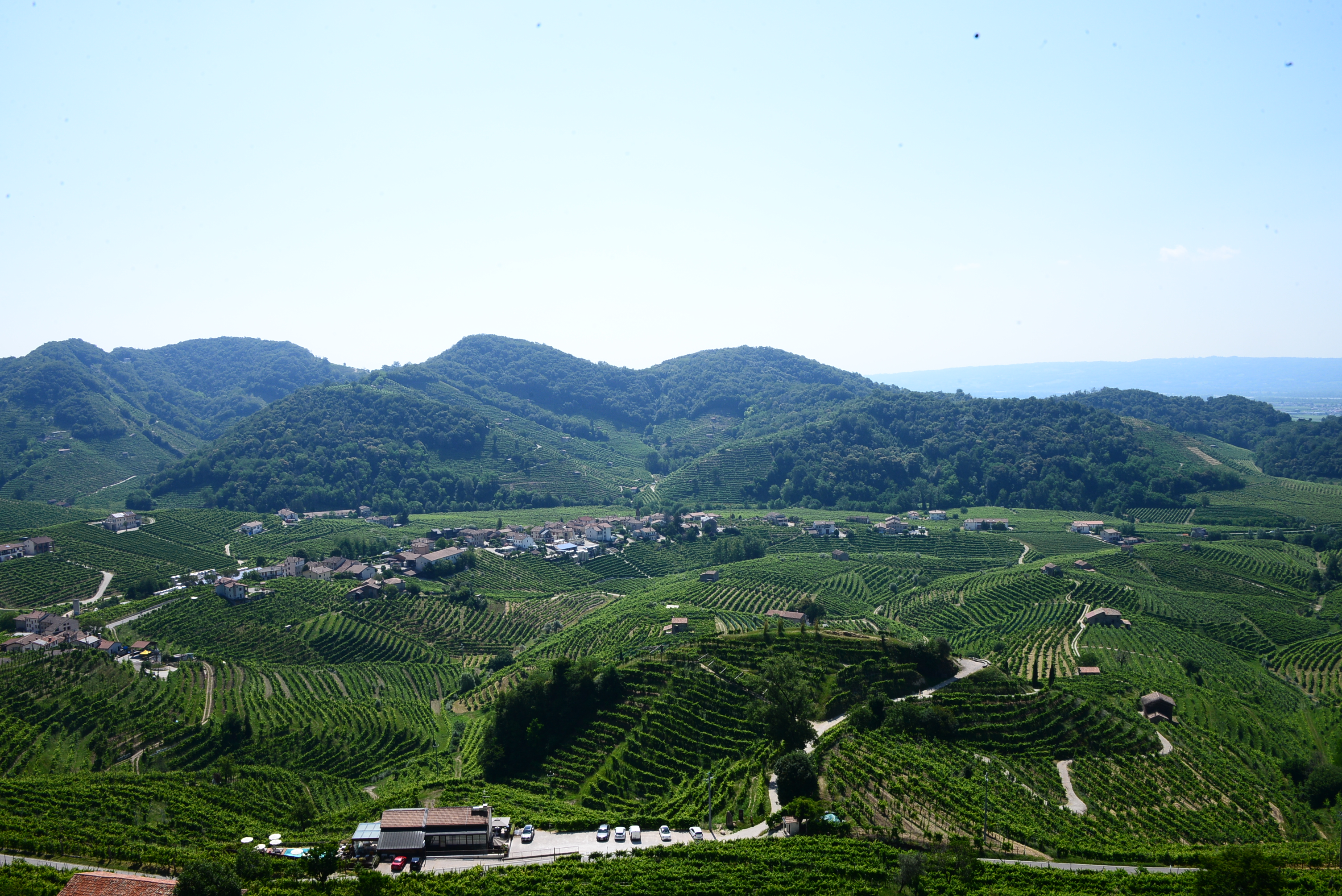
Vineyards in the Prosecco region of origin (UNESCO)

In Trieste at the beginning of the 16th century, the local wine "Ribolla" was promoted as the recreation of the Pucinian celebrated by Pliny the Elder in his Natural History and praised for its medicinal qualities by Livia, the wife of Emperor Augustus. The need to distinguish the "Ribolla" of Trieste from other wines of the same name, produced in Gorizia and at lower cost in Istria, led, at the end of the century, to a change in name. Following the supposed place of production in antiquity, the wine was referred to as "castellum nobile vinum Pucinum", after the castle near the village of Prosecco.

The first known mention of the name Prosecco is attributed to the Englishman Fynes Moryson, who used the spelling Prosecho. Moryson, visiting the north of Italy in 1593, notes: "Histria is devided into Forum Julii, and Histria properly so called ... Here growes the wine Pucinum, now called Prosecho, much celebrated by Pliny." He places Prosecco among the famous wines of Italy: "These are the most famous Wines of Italy. La lagrima di Christo and like wines neere Cinque Terre in Liguria: La vernazza, and the white Muskadine, especially that of Montefiaschoni in Tuscany: Cecubum and Falernum in the Kingdom of Naples, and Prosecho in Histria." The method of vinification, the true distinguishing feature of the original Prosecco, spread first in Gorizia, then—through Venice—in Dalmatia, Vicenza, and Treviso.

In 1754, the spelling Prosecco appears for the first time in the book Il Roccolo Ditirambo, written by Aureliano Acanti in Novoledo, in the comune (municipality) of Villaverla, located in the province of Vicenza. The wine was then known by the local Slovene-speaking population as Prosegker or Prosekar and was grown on the Adriatic coast near the villages of Contovello, Prosecco, Santa Croce and the former Roman villa town Barcola.

The verses are: Ed or ora immollarmi voglio il becco Con quel melaromatico prosecco. Di Monteberico questo perfetto prosecco eletto ci da' lo splendido nostro Canonico (in Italian), "And now I would like to wet my mouth with that Prosecco with its apple bouquet. From Monteberico this perfect favorite prosecco Our Priest give us. ... Mr Priest Jacopo Ghellini brother of Mr Pietro and Mr Marco. Those cavaliers from their estate on the Mount Berico (Monte Berico) collect the Prosecco, that has the most rare qualities, that a wine could have from any other place." Monte Berico is the hill of the city of Vicenza.

The wine was defined by the grapes used to make it, Prosecco. The village of Prosecco was about 150 km from the growing areas, and had never grown the glera grape. British importers started to be interested in importing the wine in quantity; in response the Italian minister of agriculture expanded the denominazione di origine controllata (DOC) to cover far-away Prosecco. This was followed by claiming UNESCO World Heritage status for "Prosecco Hills of Conegliano and Valdobbiadene" a few years later. Prosecco was introduced into the mainstream US market in 2000 by Mionetto, now the largest US importer of Prosecco, who reported an "incredible growth trend" in 2008. According to a 2008 New York Times report, Prosecco rose sharply in popularity in markets outside Italy, with global sales growing by double-digit percentages since 1998, aided also by its comparatively low price. The UK became in the mid-2010s the biggest export market for Prosecco, consuming one quarter of all Italian production. Production expanded massively, to €500m sales in 2019.

Until the 2008 vintage Prosecco was protected as a DOC within Italy, as Prosecco di Conegliano-Valdobbiadene, Prosecco di Conegliano, Prosecco di Valdobbiadene, and Prosecco di Colli Asolani. From 2009, these two area were promoted to DOCG status. To further protect the name, an association of traditional Prosecco growers advocated a protected designation of origin (PDO) status for northern Italian Prosecco under European law. Hence, since 1 January 2010, Prosecco is, according to an order of the Italian Minister of Agriculture of 17 July 2009, no longer the name of a grape variety (now to be called Glera), but exclusively a geographical indication. This was confirmed by EG-Regulation Nr. 1166/2009 of 30 November 2009. The Colli Asolani Prosecco Superiore DOCG later changed its name to Asolo Prosecco Superiore DOCG in 2014.

== Production ==
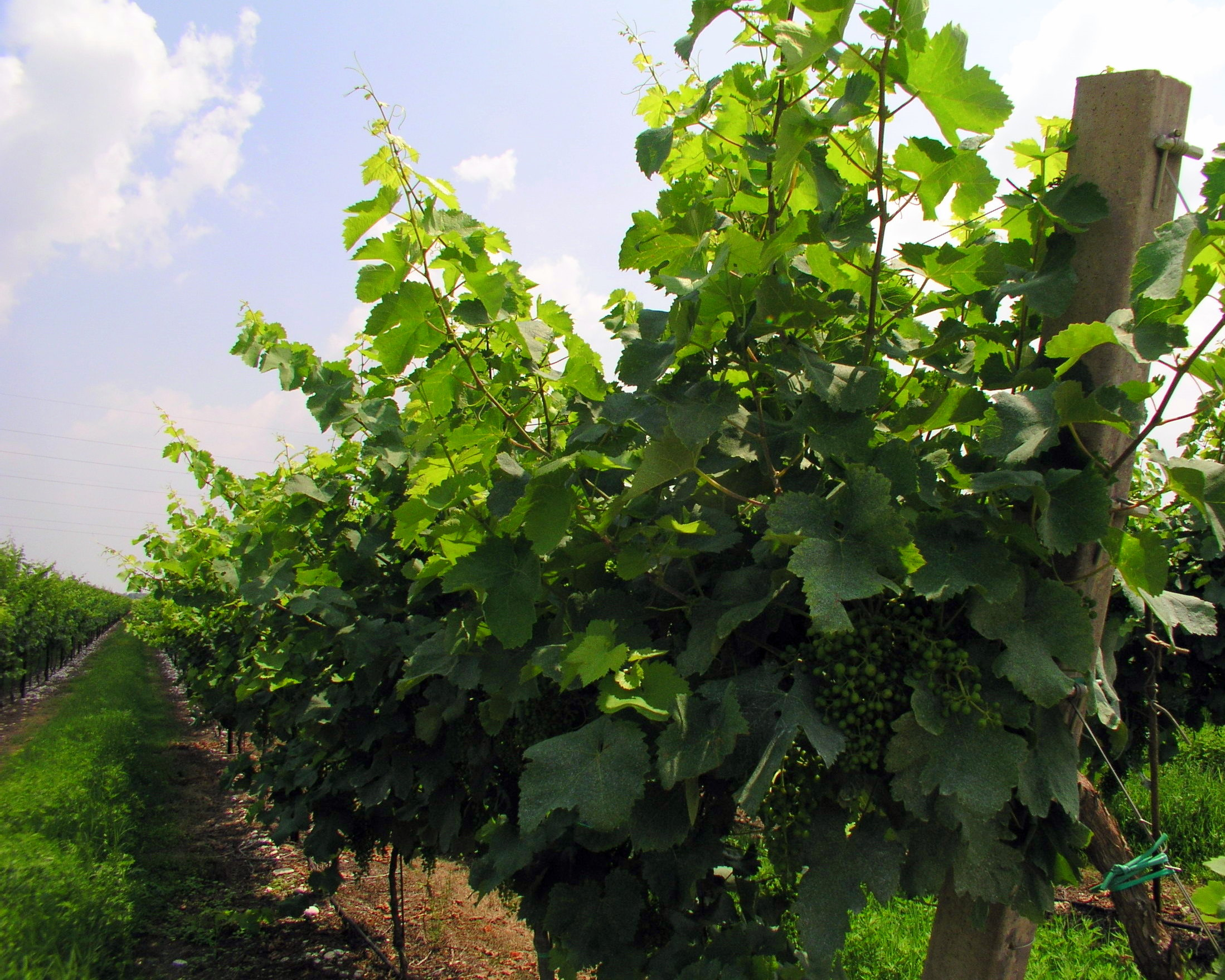
Glera grapes on the vine in the Prosecco zone, pre-veraison

Unlike Champagne and Franciacorta DOCG, Prosecco is usually produced using the alternative Charmat–Martinotti method, in which the secondary fermentation takes place in large stainless steel tanks rather than in each individual bottle, making the wine less expensive to produce, and the minimum production time is 30 days. Higher quality Prosecco using this method will ferment the wine over a longer period, up to around 9 months (Charmat Lungo). Nevertheless, the production rules for both the DOCG's also allow the use of the traditional method of secondary fermentation in the bottle, known in Italy as Metodo Classico. DOC and DOCG rules allow up to 15% of Prosecco wine to be a blend of Verdiso, Bianchetta Trevigiana, Perera, Chardonnay, Pinot bianco, Pinot grigio, or Pinot nero (vinified white).

Approximately 150 million bottles of Prosecco were produced in 2008. Huge subsequent growth meant this figure approached 600 million bottles in 2018.

Since the 2000s, Glera grapes are cultivated and wine produced in other countries, including Brazil, Romania, Argentina, and Australia.

In the region of Conegliano and Valdobbiadene DOCG, there are more than 150 producers, and together they form the Consortium for the Protection of Prosecco from Conegliano and Valdobbiadene (Consorzio per la Tutela del Prosecco di Conegliano e Valdobbiadene). DOCG also has its own consorzio, with 94 producers.

=== Prosecco DOC ===
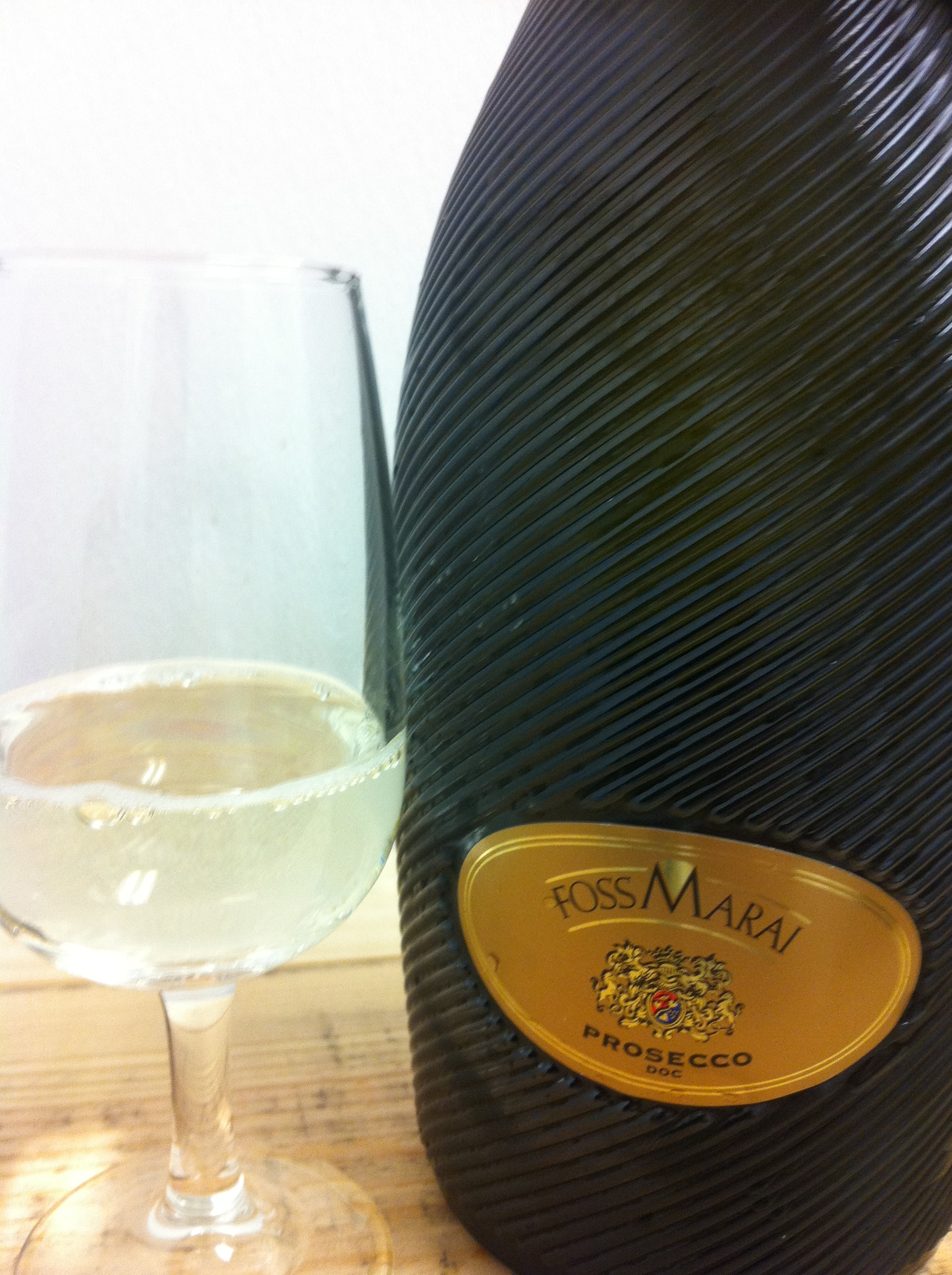
Bottle of Prosecco showing the DOC designation on the label

Most Prosecco, whether DOC or DOCG, is made as Spumante sparkling wine or Frizzante (semi-sparkling). Prosecco DOC Spumante is the most famous and popular variety, with longer-lasting bubbles. Prosecco DOC Frizzante has bubbles that linger for a shorter time. A small proportion is made as Tranquillo (still wine), with no bubbles. Tranquillo amounts to only about 5% of production, and this wine is rarely exported.

Depending on their sweetness, in accordance with the EU Sweetness of wine Regulations for Terms used to indicate sweetness of sparkling wine, Proseccos are labelled "Brut" (up to 12 grams per litre of residual sugar), "Extra Dry" (12–17 g/L) or "Dry" (17–32 g/L). Extra-Dry has been the dominant style made, but the amount of Brut is now increasing.

Glera grapes made in a Prosecco style outside the DOC/DOCG have a non-protected designation, such as "IGT Veneto", are generally cheaper and of more variable quality and cannot be called Prosecco. While all Prosecco is currently vinified white, a rosé version has been proposed, but only for the DOC, as it was rejected by the DOCG. It is probably that such a rosé, which would include a small proportion of Pinot nero vinified red, will be adopted only at the DOC level from the 2019 harvest and therefore be available to buy from as early as January 2020.

=== Prosecco Superiore DOCG ===
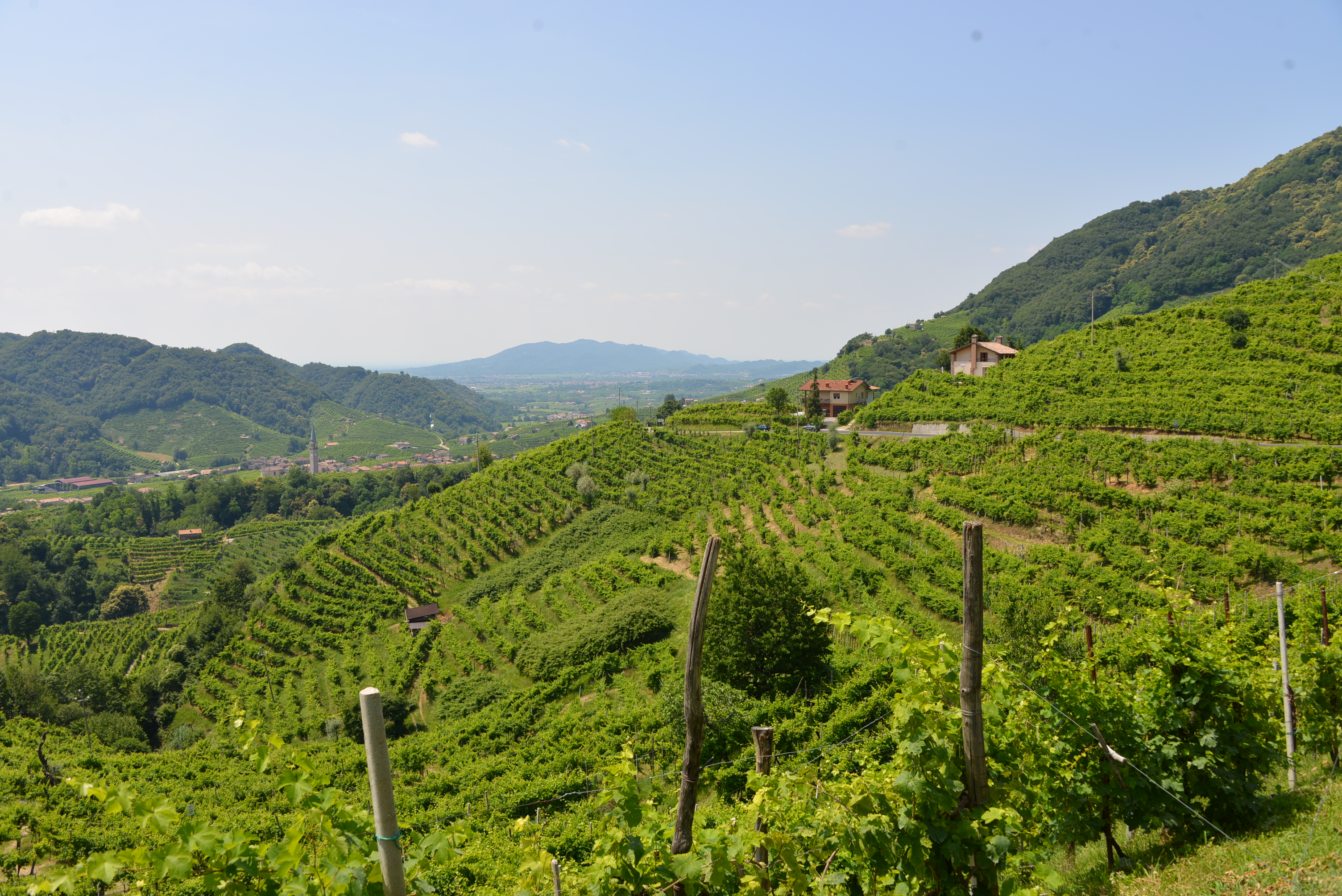
Prosecco Valley, UNESCO World Heritage Site

There are two Prosecco Superiore DOCGs, divided by the River Piave, in the province of Treviso, Veneto. Prosecco Conegliano Valdobbiadene Superiore DOCG is made on the hills between the comuni (municipalities) of Conegliano, Valdobbiadene, and Vittorio Veneto. Producers from Valdobbiadene have recently tended to skip mention of Conegliano on their front label, calling their wine Valdobbiadene Prosecco Superiore. The second DOCG is the smaller Asolo Prosecco Superiore DOCG, produced on the hills near the comune of Asolo. Currently, in addition to the usual range of Prosecco styles, Asolo DOCG can also make an "Extra-Brut" (0-6 g/L), and Conegliano Valdobbiadene is expected to introduce this style soon. While the bulk of Prosecco DOC is grown on low-lying plains in an extended area covering 23,300 hectares, the DOCG Prosecco Superiore is grown exclusively on hillside vineyards in two far smaller growing areas, 6,860 hectares for Conegliano Valdobbiadene and 1,783 hectares for Asolo. The steepness of the hills means that everything, from pruning to picking, is principally done by hand. The manual aspect, especially for the harvest, further increases quality.

=== Superiore di Cartizze subzone ===
The hill of Cartizze is a 305-metre-high (1,001 ft) vineyard of 107 hectares (260 acres) of vines, owned by 140 growers. The Prosecco from its grapes, of which comparatively little is produced, is widely considered to be of the highest quality, or even the "Grand Cru" of Prosecco.

Theoretically, a hectare of Cartizze grape land was estimated to be worth in excess of 1 million US dollars in 2008 and its value was estimated to have increased to 1.5–2 million euros in 2015, the most for a vineyard in Italy. The sparkling wine produced from Cartizze has recently been named by producers as Superiore di Cartizze, without mentioning Prosecco on the front label to further emphasize its territory.

According to a local legend, Cartizze grapes traditionally were harvested last, as the vines were situated on steep slopes and hard to reach, which led to vintners discovering that this extended ripening period improved the flavour. Nonetheless, in a blind tasting at the 2006 Vinitaly trade fair, Cartizze spumanti were ranked consistently behind "normal" Prosecco.

=== Rive subzones ===
While Cartizze is a subzone at the top of the Prosecco Conegliano Valdobbiadene Superiore DOCG quality pyramid, their Consorzio has also introduced official Rive delimitations, i.e. 15 communes that can make 43 different Rive subzone wines. These are named after the individual hills where the grapes originate, though this adds complexity and adoption so far is patchy. The intention is to highlight the different microclimates and distinct terroirs found in the DOCG. Asolo Superiore DOCG has not introduced subzones.

=== Col Fondo ===
Some winemakers are reviving the traditional Prosecco Col Fondo, refermented in the bottle but not disgorged, as the wines are left on their lees. This yeasty residue leaves fine sediment in the bottom of the bottle (Italian: fondo) that imparts more complexity, texture and flavour. They can be served either clear or cloudy. These wines are labelled Conegliano Valdobbiadene Superiore DOCG, or Asolo Superiore DOCG. Col Fondo generally has a lower Frizzante-style 250 kilopascals (2.5 bars) of pressure.

== Consumption ==
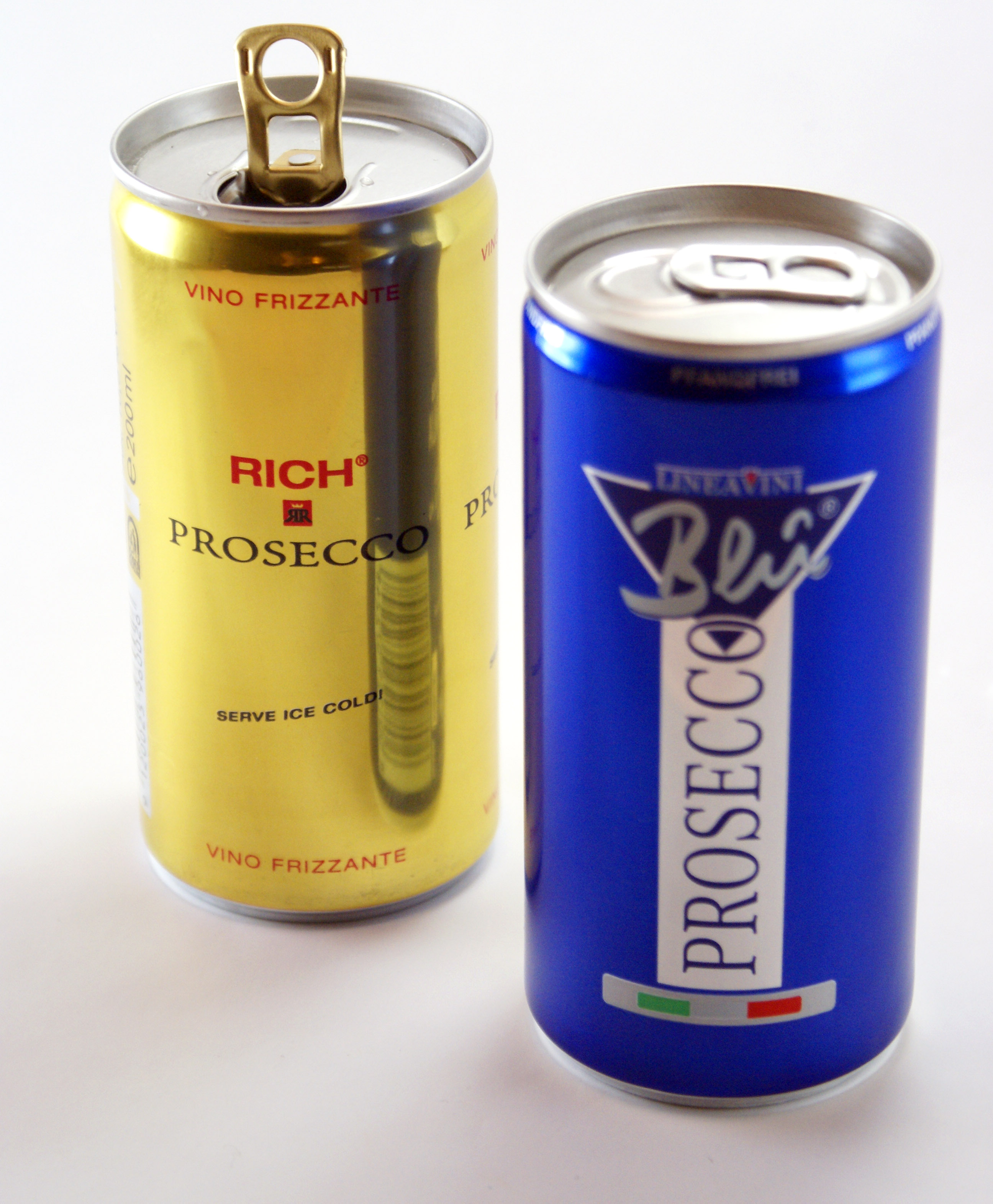
Cheap Prosecco is also sold in cans.

In Italy, Prosecco is a ubiquitously used wine. Outside Italy, it is most often drunk as an apéritif. As with other sparkling wines, Prosecco is served chilled.

Except for Col Fondo and any Mètodo Classico Prosecco, most Prosecco does not ferment in the bottle. Usually, it should be drunk young, preferably within three to five years of its vintage. However, high-quality Prosecco may be aged for up to seven years.

The view that Prosecco cannot be aged has been challenged by other experts. A tasting in 2013 of wines produced between 1983 and 2013 demonstrated the longevity of the wines from one of their top producers.

Prosecco has a minimum of 10.5–11.5% alcohol by volume, depending on the DOC/DOCG rules. The flavour of Prosecco has been described as aromatic and crisp, bringing to mind yellow apple, pear, white peach, and apricot. Most Prosecco variants have intense primary aromas and are meant to taste fresh, light and comparatively simple.

Most commonly Prosecco is served unmixed, but it also appears in several mixed drinks. It is the main ingredient in the original Bellini and Spritz cocktails, and it can also be used in others, such as the Mimosa. With vodka and lemon gelato, Prosecco is also an ingredient of the Italian mixed drink sgroppino.
