= U-boot (cocktail) =

Beer cocktail made by dropping a shot of vodka into a glass of beer

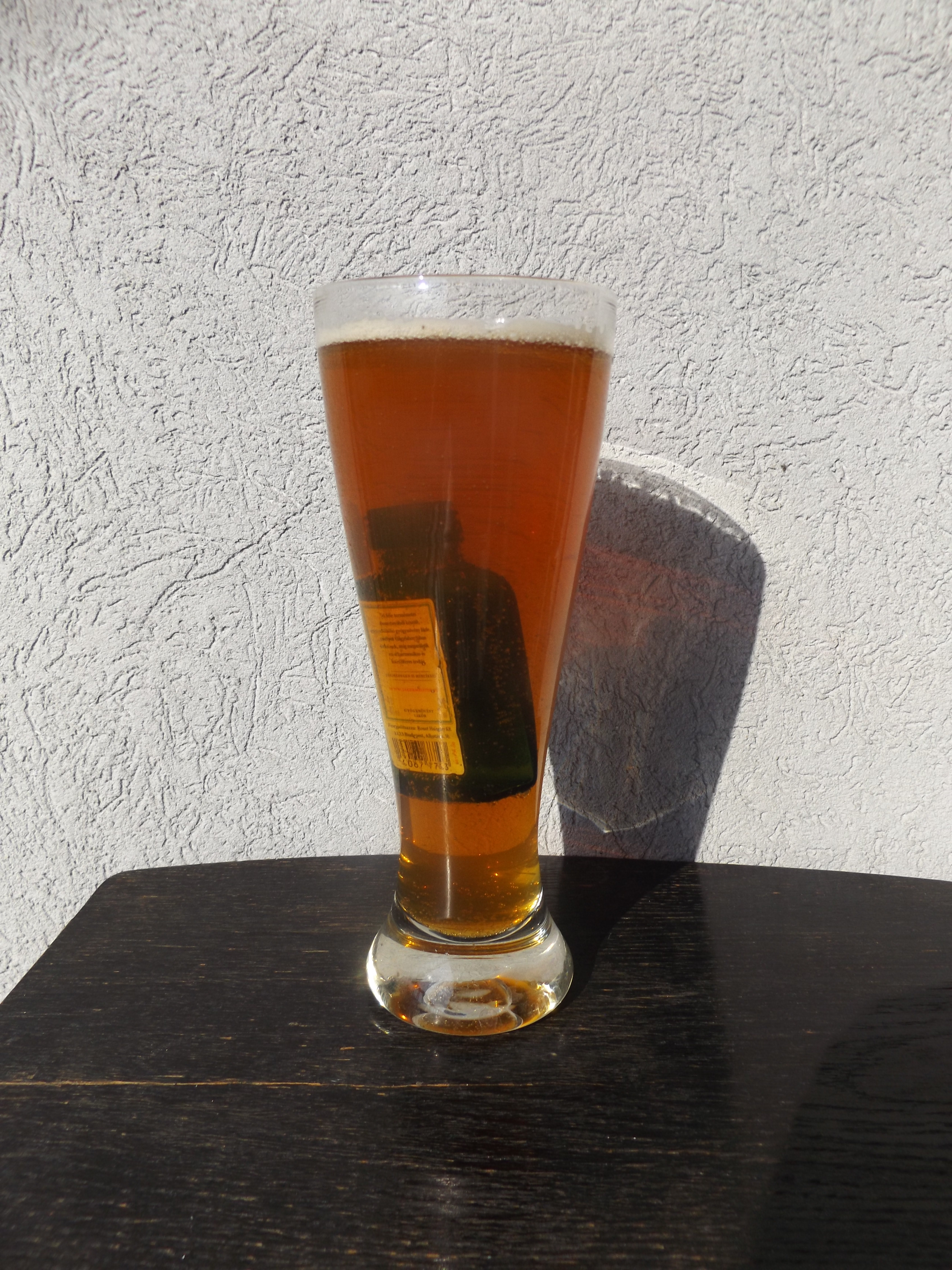
U-Boot cocktail, made of beer and a shot of Jägermeister, in a beer glass

A U-boot is a beer cocktail that is made by placing a shot of vodka into a glass of beer, typically a lager. It is popular in Germany, Poland, North Macedonia, and Flanders. In Germany, the liquor korn is sometimes used instead, while in Flanders and the Netherlands, jonge jenever is preferred.

It is called a U-boot (German abbreviation of Unterseeboot, "submarine") because the shot glass of vodka sinks to the bottom of the glass of beer. The shot glass then "surfaces" when the cocktail is drunk.

== Preparation ==
Place a shot glass on upside down glass and fill it with vodka. Place a pint glass over the two glasses so it sits against the shot glass and flip them over. Fill the pint glass with lager and as the drink is consumed the vodka will leak into drink.

== Other names and variations ==
In Flanders and the Netherlands, it is called a "Duikboot", literally translated "Submarine". It is seen as a variant on the kopstoot (lit. "headbutt") in the Netherlands. The kopstoot is a shot of jenever followed by a beer as a chaser.

In North Macedonia it is called "Подморница" - "Podmornica", literally translated "Submarine". It uses tequila which is dropped into a big pint.

In southern Germany, U-boot is usually served as a combination of Fanta and cognac instead of beer and vodka.

In Mexico, it is called "Submarino", Spanish for "Submarine". Instead of vodka, it uses tequila, and the shot glass must be left inverted inside the beer glass.

In Russia, it is most often called "Глубинная бомба", Russian for "Depth charge". Usually any cocktail, mixing vodka and beer called in Russia "Ёрш", (Yorsh) literally meaning a wire brush. It is also rarely called "Водолаз" - "Vodolaz", literally translated as "Diver".

In Sorbia, vodka and orange juice is used.

In Brazil, it is called "Submarino", Portuguese for "Submarine". In the south, where it is more easily found, it is common practice to use steinhäger instead of vodka.

In Sweden, it is called "Ubåt", Swedish for "Submarine". Jägermeister is used instead of vodka.

In Greece, it is called "υποβρύχιο", Greek for "Submarine". Served as a shot glass of Jack Daniels sink into the bottom of a short glass of beer.

== See also ==
- Boilermaker (beer cocktail)
- Flaming Doctor Pepper
- Irish car bomb (cocktail)
- Jägerbomb
- Queen Mary (beer cocktail)
- Sake bomb
- Somaek
- Yorsh
