= Monaco (cocktail) =

Alcoholic beverage from France

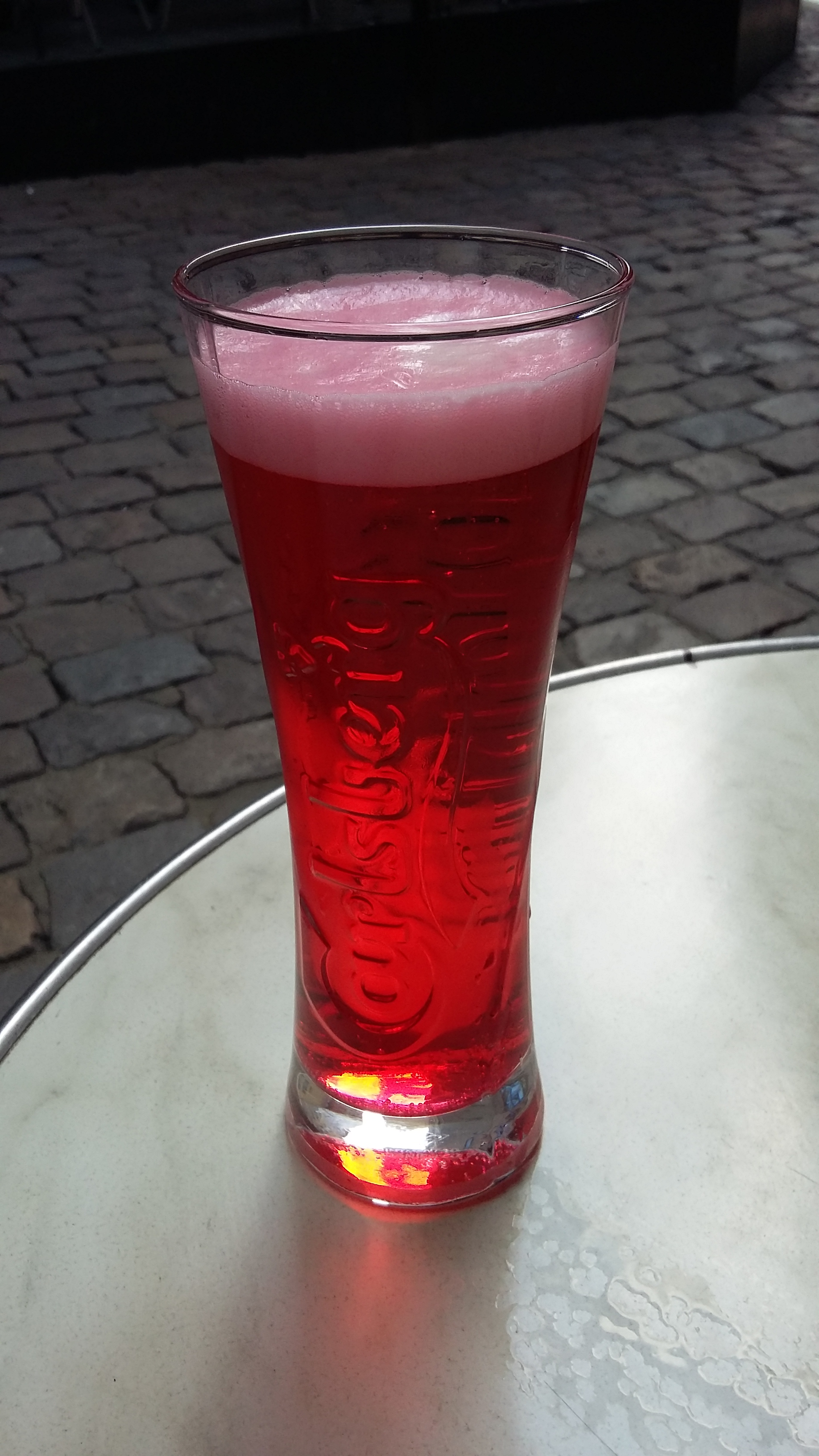
- A Monaco beer cocktail
- Type: Mixed drink
- Ingredients: 1/2 glass of beer; 1/2 glass of carbonated lemonade; Dash of grenadine
- Standard drinkware: Beer glassware
- Served: Neat; chilled

A Monaco is a beer cocktail that is popular in France, made of equal parts lager and carbonated lemonade along with a dash of grenadine, and is best enjoyed cold.

== History ==
The creation of the Monaco is commonly attributed to George Booth, who was inspired by the cocktail snakebite, which is made from cider and beer. The name of the drink reportedly derives from the red and white colours of the flag of Monaco.

In 1995, Heineken launched “Monaco de Panach”, a bottled version of the Monaco.

== See also ==
- Queen Mary (cocktail)
- Shandy
