= Porchcrawler =

Bubbly cocktail

A porchcrawler, also known as a porchclimb, is a mixed drink made primarily of beer, a liquor, and a sweetening agent (for instance, lemonade concentrate). The most common liquors for the drink are vodka, gin, rum or whiskey. The final product is generally a highly-alcoholic, carbonated punch with a fruity taste and a light pink or yellow color. It is typically served from a large cooler of ice and is especially popular with North American college students.

== Variations ==
A variation, known as skip and go naked, is made with gin instead of vodka. When made with pink lemonade, it is termed the pink panty dropper.

Another variation is called "jungle juice". Alternatively, the turbo-shandy combines beer (usually lager) with a lemon-based product and a Smirnoff Ice chaser.

== See also ==
- Jägerbomb
- List of cocktails
- Queen Mary (cocktail)
- Sake bomb
