= Black velvet (cocktail) =

Beer cocktail made from stout beer and white sparkling wine

- A layered Black Velvet cocktail with the stout on the top
- Type: Mixed drink
- Ingredients: Stout and Champagne
- Standard drinkware: Pilsner glass
- Served: Straight
- Preparation: Mix equal parts stout and Champagne

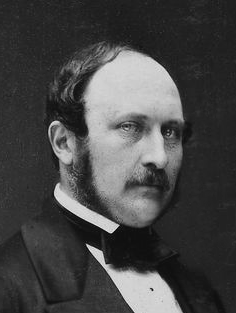
Prince Albert in 1860, the year before his death

A black velvet is a beer cocktail made from a combination of stout (often Guinness) and white sparkling wine (often Champagne).

== History ==
The drink was first made by a bartender of Brooks's Club in London in 1861 to mourn the death of Prince Albert, Queen Victoria's Prince Consort. It is supposed to symbolize the black armbands worn by mourners. It was said that “even the champagne should be in mourning.” Today, the drink is not exclusive to mourning.

== Preparation ==
A black velvet is made by mixing equal parts of stout and Champagne or cider without ice.

=== Layered variation ===
A black velvet can also be made by filling a champagne flute halfway with sparkling wine and floating the chilled stout beer on top of the wine. The differing densities of the liquids cause them to remain largely in separate layers (as in a pousse-café). The effect is best achieved by pouring the stout over a spoon turned upside down over the top of the glass.

== Similar drinks ==
- When cider or perry is used in place of champagne, it is sometimes still known as a black velvet in its originating country (the UK) and in Ireland. However, the cider version is usually referred to as a poor-man's black velvet everywhere, including in the U.K. and Ireland.
- In Germany, a version of the drink made with Schwarzbier (a dark lager) and served in a beer stein or beer mug is called a "Bismarck" after the chancellor, Otto von Bismarck, who supposedly drank it by the gallon.
- The Champagne Velvet appeared in Jacob Grohusko's 1910 cocktail guide Jack's Manual, and called for equal parts cold porter and champagne, stirred slowly in a goblet.
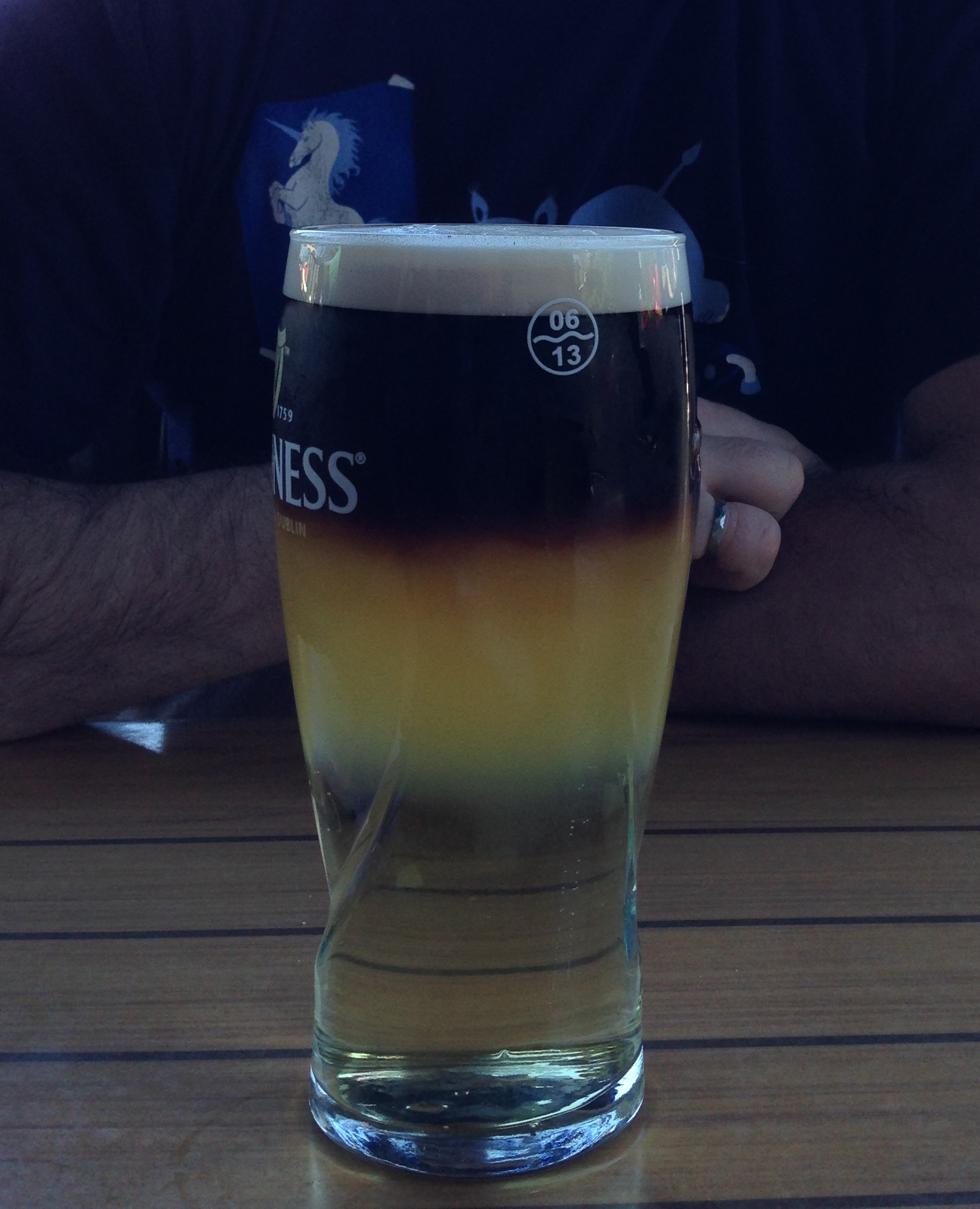
  Bien JoJay
- In Latvia Black velvet is cocktail made with champagne and Rīgas black balsam.

== See also ==
- Irish car bomb (cocktail)
- Queen Mary (beer cocktail)
- Shandy
