= Bomb shot =

Cocktail dropping a small glass of alcoholic drink into a larger one

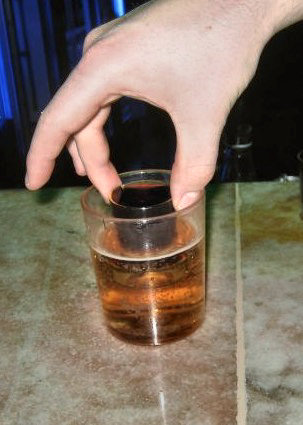
Preparing a bomb shot

A bomb shot, depth charge, or drop shot (Canada) is a kind of mixed drink. A drink in a small glass (typically a shot glass) is dropped into a larger glass holding a different drink. The resulting cocktail is typically consumed as quickly as possible ("chugged").

== Preparation ==
A bomb shot typically consists of a shot glass of hard liquor that is dropped into a glass partially filled with beer but sometimes with some other beverage. Many variations exist. When the shot is dropped into a pint it is commonly known as a "depth charge", because it resembles the anti-submarine weapon being dropped on a target.

Examples of popular bomb shots include:

- The Boilermaker: a shot of whisky dropped into beer
- Flaming Doctor Pepper: a shot of Amaretto and Bacardi 151 which is lit on fire and dropped into beer
- Jägerbomb: a shot of Jägermeister dropped into a glass containing an energy drink. Likewise, the F-Bomb—Fireball Cinnamon Whisky and Red Bull.
- Irish car bomb: a shot glass containing 1/2 Irish cream and 1/2 Irish whiskey dropped into half a pint of Guinness stout
- Sake bomb: a shot of sake dropped into beer
- Skittle bomb: a shot of Cointreau dropped into a glass containing an energy drink
- Poktanju (Korean: 폭탄주): a shot of soju dropped into a glass of beer

== See also ==
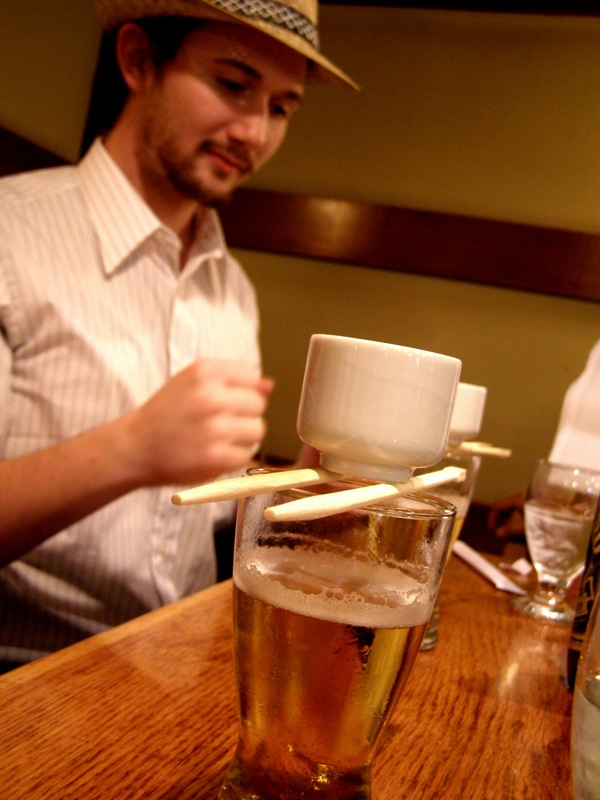
Two sake bombs about to be dropped into beer

- Cocktail
- Drinking culture
- Shooter (mixed drink)
- Tequila slammer
- U-boot (cocktail)
