= Beer cocktail =

Cocktail made by mixing beer with a distilled beverage

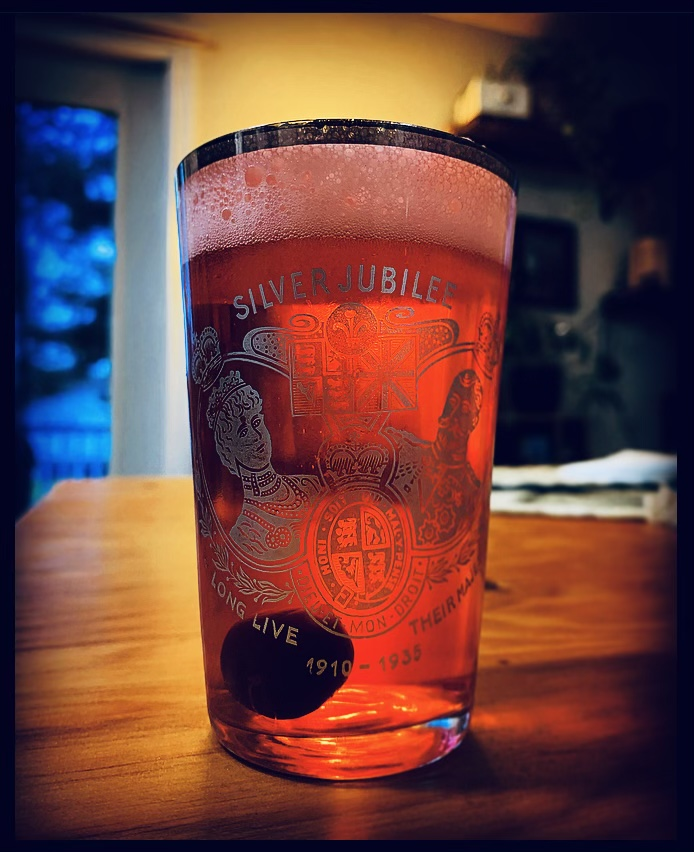
A Queen Mary: beer, grenadine and maraschino cherries

A beer cocktail is a cocktail that is made by mixing beer with other ingredients (such as a distilled beverage) or another style of beer. In this type of cocktail, the primary ingredient is usually beer.

== List of beer cocktails ==
- Black and tan – A layered drink made from a blend of pale ale and a dark beer such as a stout or porter. Traditionally uses bitter and stout
- Black Velvet – A layered drink using a combination of Stout and sparkling wine or champagne
- Blow My Skull – Ale or porter with rum and brandy
- Boilermaker – Mild ale mixed with bottled brown ale (United Kingdom). The American version is a glass of beer with a shot of whiskey
- Egg in beer – an English drink consisting of raw egg cracked into a beer, which has also become a colloquial expression
- Flaming Doctor Pepper – a flaming drink made from a bomb shot of high-proof alcohol and Amaretto ignited and dropped into a pint of beer
- Hangman's blood – Porter combined with brandy, gin and rum
- Irish car bomb – a pint glass containing half a pint of Irish stout with a mixed bomb shot of Irish cream and Irish whiskey
- Michelada – Beer with citrus juice (e.g. lime juice), tomato juice, seasoning, chili sauce and Worcestershire sauce A variant of cerveza preparada (Mexican prepared beer)
- Porchcrawler – Equal parts of beer, vodka, and lemonade concentrate
- Queen Mary – Beer with grenadine and maraschino cherries, originally from Canada, named for Mary of Teck
- Red Eye – beer, tomato juice (or clamato in Canada), with optional lemon or hot sauce
- Sake bomb – Shot of sake poured or dropped into a glass of beer
- Shandy or radler – Beer with lemonade, citrus soda, ginger beer, ginger ale, or fruit juice, e.g. grapefruit
- Snakebite – Equal parts lager and cider
- Somaek – Soju mixed with beer
- Spaghett – Miller High Life mixed with Aperol and lemon juice
- U-boot – Glass of beer with a bomb shot containing vodka

== See also ==
- List of cocktails
- Beer mix
- Bierlikör – beer liqueur
- Tomato beer
