= Black and tan =

Blend of pale ale and a dark beer

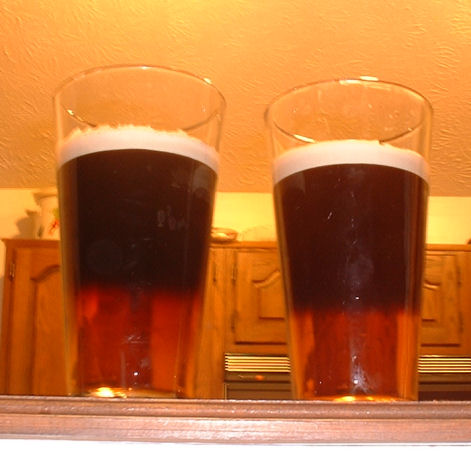
- A blend of Guinness stout and Bass pale ale
- Type: Mixed drink
- Ingredients: Pale ale or lager and stout or porter
- Standard drinkware: Pint glass
- Served: Neat: undiluted and without ice

A black and tan is a beer cocktail made by layering a pale beer (usually pale ale) and a dark beer (usually stout). It is also known as a half and half.

== History ==
The term likely originated in England, where consumers have blended different beers since at least the 17th century. The tradition of blending beers can be traced to London during the 1700s where beer blends or "three-threads" and "five-threads" were consumed. Each thread was a beer type that was blended into a drink. Three threads was a form of mixed beer alehouses sold to avoid paying a higher tax on beer. By taking a strong beer taxed at a higher rate and mixing it with a small beer taxed at a lower-rate, brewers were able to turn a higher profit. This practice continued from the late 1690s to 1700s. The earliest recorded usage of the term black and tan in the drink context is from 1881, according to the Oxford English Dictionary, in the American magazine Puck. The first recorded British use of the term to describe a drink is from 1889.

In Ireland, the drink's name is liable to be misconstrued as a reference to the Black and Tans, a notorious paramilitary force sent to the country by the British during the Irish War of Independence (1919–21). In March 2006, Ben and Jerry's caused controversy by releasing an ice cream flavour inspired by the drink for Saint Patrick's Day. The company apologised and a spokesman told Reuters, "Any reference on our part to the British Army [sic] unit was absolutely unintentional and no ill will was ever intended." The drink's name was again in the news in March 2012, when Nike, as part of an Irish-themed set of designs, released a pair of shoes advertised as the "Black and Tan".

In Australia, one can order a "Tooheys Recent", which uses Tooheys Old and Tooheys New for the dark and pale beers, respectively.

== Preparation ==
A black and tan is prepared by filling a glass halfway with pale ale, then adding stout to fill the glass completely. An upside-down tablespoon may be placed over the glass to avoid splashing and mixing the layers. A specially designed black-and-tan spoon is bent in the middle so that it can balance on the edge of the pint-glass for easier pouring. The "layering" of Guinness on top of the pale ale or lager is possible because of the lower relative density of the Guinness.

Several American breweries currently make premixed black and tan, for example Yuengling makes a drink called Yuengling's Original Black and Tan.

== See also ==
- Black velvet (cocktail)
- Irish car bomb
- Queen Mary (cocktail)
- Shandy
