= Somaek =

Cocktail made with soju and beer

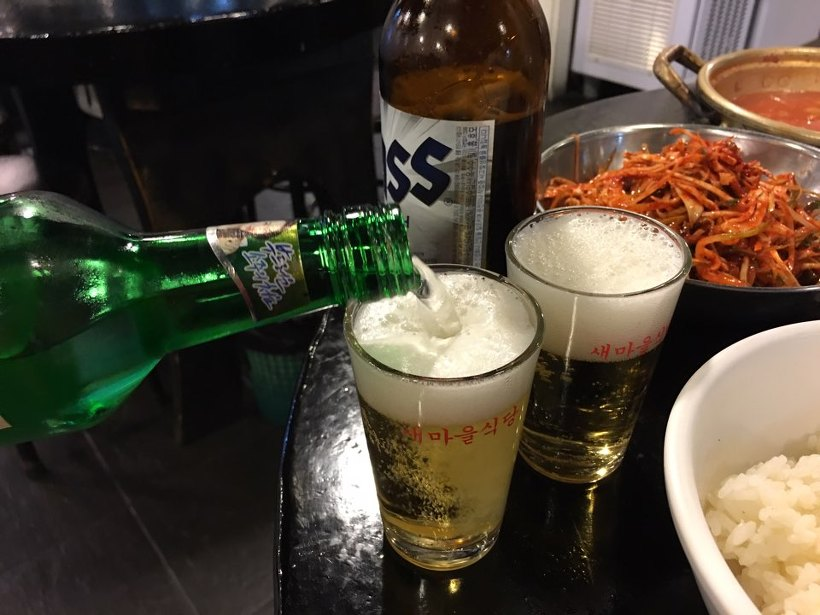
- Type: Beer cocktail
- Base spirit: Beer, Soju
- Served: Straight up: chilled, without ice

Somaek (Korean: 소맥) is a South Korean beer cocktail made with soju and beer. The beer used is typically a lager-style.

== Description ==
It is a syllabic abbreviation of two Korean words, soju (소주) and Maekju (맥주, "beer").

The ratio varies liberally. There is no consensus, but it is widely suggested that the ideal ratio is three parts soju to seven parts beer.

== See also ==
- Boilermaker
- Queen Mary (cocktail)
- U-Boot
- Yorsh
- Chimaek
