= Boilermaker (beer cocktail) =

Beer cocktail

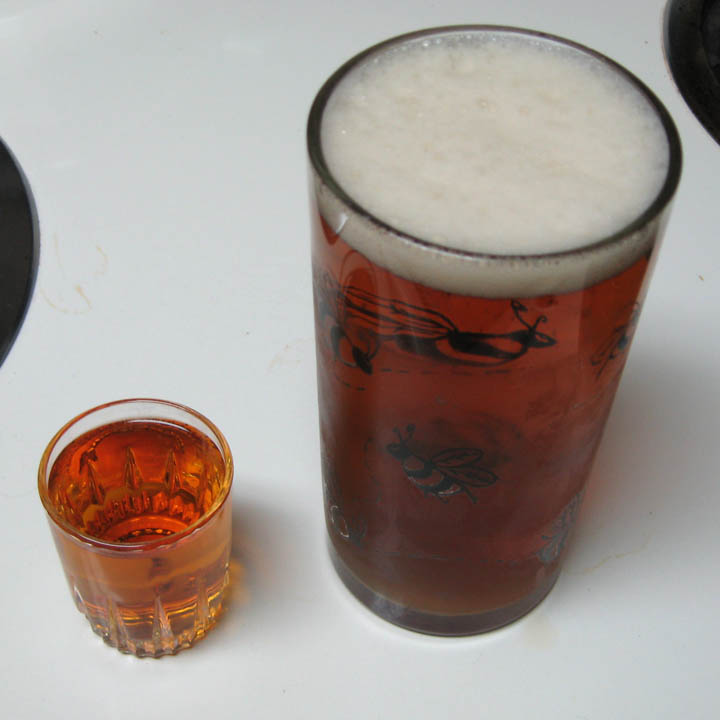
The ingredients of the American version of a boilermaker

A boilermaker is either of two types of beer cocktail. In American terminology, the drink consists of a glass of beer mixed with a shot of whiskey. In England, the term boilermaker traditionally refers to a half pint of draught mild ale mixed with a half pint of bottled brown ale.

== Name ==
The American cocktail originated in Butte, Montana in the 1890s. It was originally called a Sean O'Farrell and was served only when miners ended their shifts.

When the beer is instead served separately as a chaser, that is often called simply a shot and a beer. In Scotland, the serving of a half pint of beer alongside a "wee hauf" glass of whisky (one-quarter gill, 36 ml) is called a half and a half.

The English boilermaker (a mix of draught mild and bottled brown ale) is also known as a 'brown split' in the south-west of England, although it also refers to the American shot and pint. The boiler-maker name for the ale cocktail dates back to circa 1920.

== Drinking ==
There are a number of ways to drink an American beer chaser:

- Traditionally, the liquor is consumed in a single gulp and is then "chased" by the beer, which is sipped.
- The liquor and beer may be mixed by pouring or dropping the shot into the beer. The mixture may be stirred. If the shot glass is dropped into the beer glass, the drink can also be known as a depth charge.

== Similar drinks ==
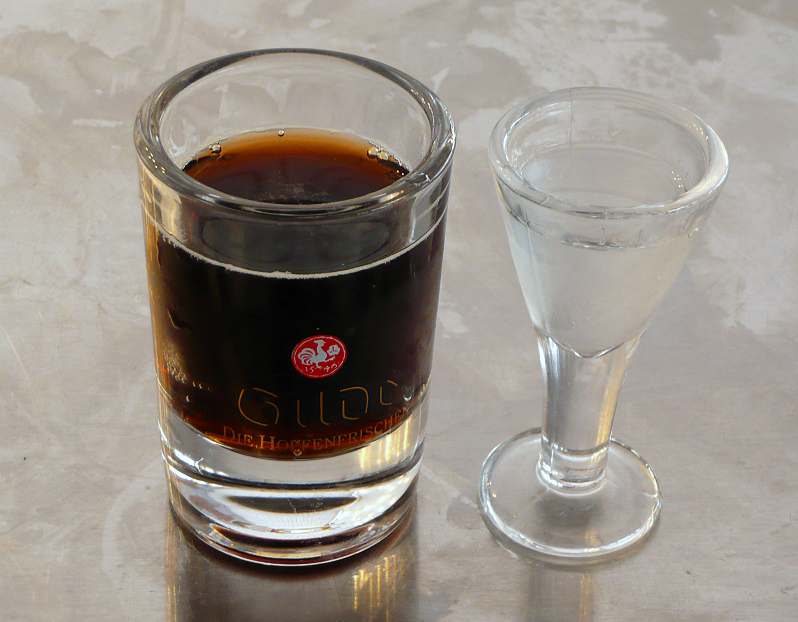
A Lüttje Lage, a common pairing in the Hannover region, of a 50 ml (1.7 US fl oz) glass of beer and 10 ml (0.34 US fl oz) glass of Korn.

Other pairings of a shot and a beer are possible; traditional pairings include:

- Herrengedeck ("gentlemen's menu"), a German pairing of Korn (rye brandy) and beer
- Regenschirm ("umbrella"), a German pairing of Allasch and Gose
- Lüttje Lage, a German pairing of top-fermented beer and Korn.
- Irish car bomb (cocktail), a pairing of a shot of Irish cream and whiskey into a glass of stout
- Kopstootje ("little headbutt"), a Dutch pairing of Jenever (Dutch gin) and beer, term attested 1943
- Somaek or Poktan-ju, a Korean pairing of soju and beer
- The Chicago Handshake or Chicago Drive-by, a shot of Jeppson's Malört alongside Old Style beer
- The Citywide, sometimes called the Citywide Special, a Philadelphia pairing of a shot of Jim Beam and a Pabst Blue Ribbon

== See also ==
- Black and tan
- Queen Mary (beer cocktail)
- Shandy
- Yorsh
