= Snakebite (drink) =

Alcoholic drink made with equal parts of lager and cider

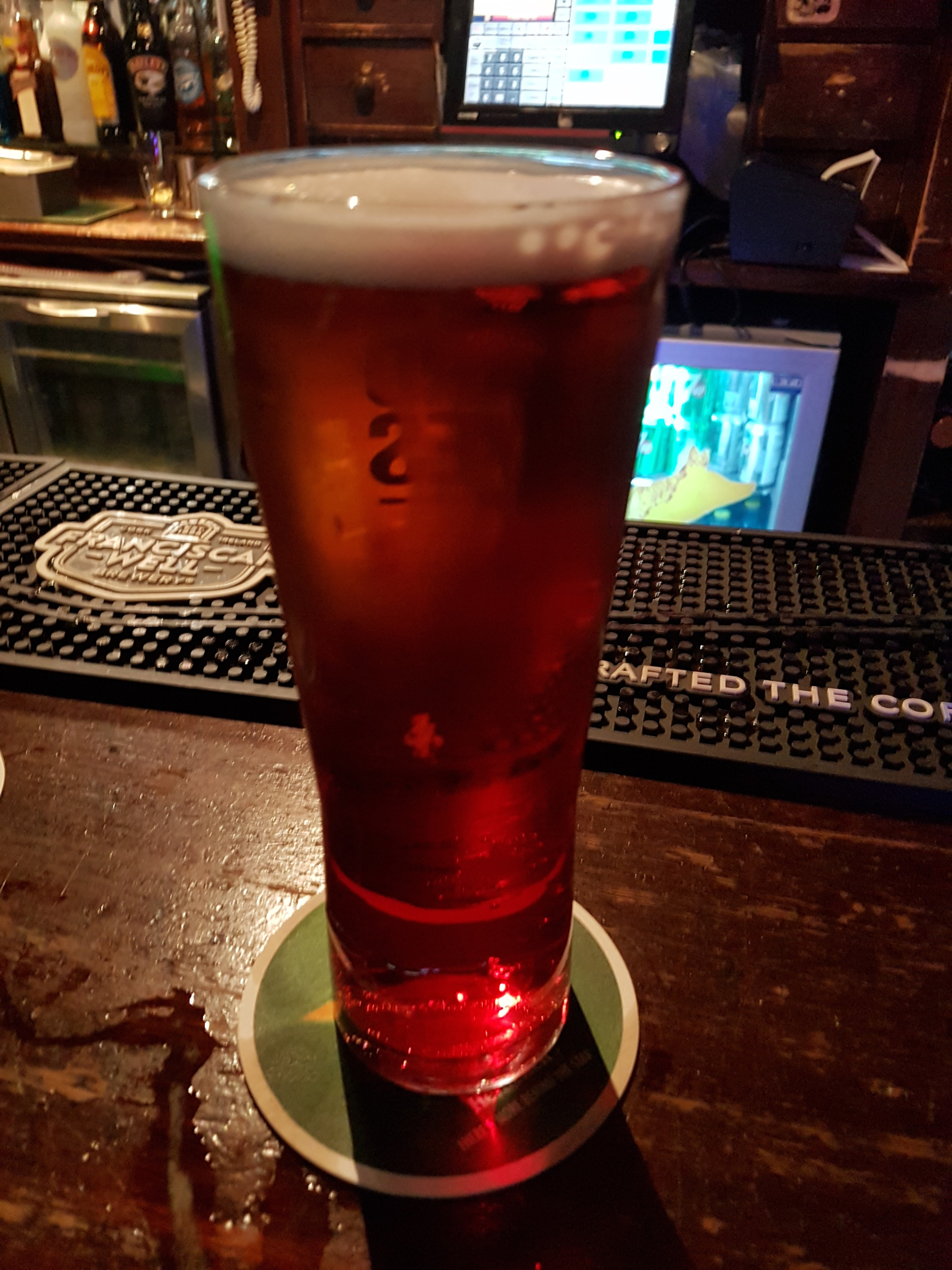
- A pint of snakebite
- Ingredients: One part lager/one part cider
- Standard drinkware: Pint glass
- Served: Without ice (no rocks)
- Preparation: Mix in a standard pint glass equal parts lager and cider

A snakebite is an alcoholic drink made with equal parts lager and cider. If a dash of blackcurrant cordial is added, it is known as a "Snakebite and Black", or rarely, a "Diesel". It was first popularised in the UK in the 1980s.

== Availability in the UK ==
A snakebite is typically served in a pint glass. Serving a snakebite from separate cider and lager taps or bottles is legal in the UK, despite sources that suggest otherwise, however many pubs have their own policies against serving them as the rules are still seen as unclear. In 2001, former US President Bill Clinton was refused a snakebite when he ordered one at the Old Bell Tavern in Harrogate, North Yorkshire as a consequence of this misconception.

== See also ==
- Queen Mary (cocktail)
- Shandy
- Black and tan
