= Pousse-café =

Pousse-café (French, lit. 'coffee-pusher') may refer to:

- a digestif served after the coffee course
- a layered drink composed of several layers of differently colored liqueurs
