= Bierbrand =

Type of liquor

Bierbrand (also known as Bierschnaps or Eau de vie de bière) is a liquor produced by distilling beer. Bierbrand produced in the European Union and Switzerland is required to contain at least 38% alcohol by volume and retain the flavor profile of beer. Additives such as neutral spirits or flavorings are prohibited, except for caramel color.

It is a traditional spirit in the German state of Bavaria, where small brewers would convert excess or leftover beer, a perishable good, into a spirit with a longer shelf-life. It can be consumed neat, either chilled or at room temperature, or is sometimes mixed into beer to make a boilermaker. Bierbrand is also occasionally used as an ingredient in Bierlikör.

Bierbrand differs from whiskey in that it is not aged in oak barrels, and whiskey is made without hops.
