= Hangman's blood =

Cocktail that includes rum, gin, brandy and porter

A hangman's blood is a beer cocktail made of gin, whisky, rum, port, brandy, stout and champagne.

== History ==
It was first described by Richard Hughes in his 1929 novel, A High Wind in Jamaica. According to Hughes:

"Hangman's blood... is compounded of rum, gin, brandy, and porter... Innocent (merely beery) as it looks, refreshing as it tastes, it has the property of increasing rather than allaying thirst, and so once it has made a breach, soon demolishes the whole fort."

== Preparation ==
Anthony Burgess described its preparation as pouring doubles of gin, whisky, rum, port and brandy into a pint glass. A small bottle of stout is added and the drink is topped with champagne. According to Burgess, "it tastes very smooth, induces a somewhat metaphysical elation, and rarely leaves a hangover."

== See also ==
- Beer cocktails
- Cocktails
- List of cocktails
- Queen Mary (beer cocktail)
