= Sake bomb =

Cocktail made by pouring sake in beer

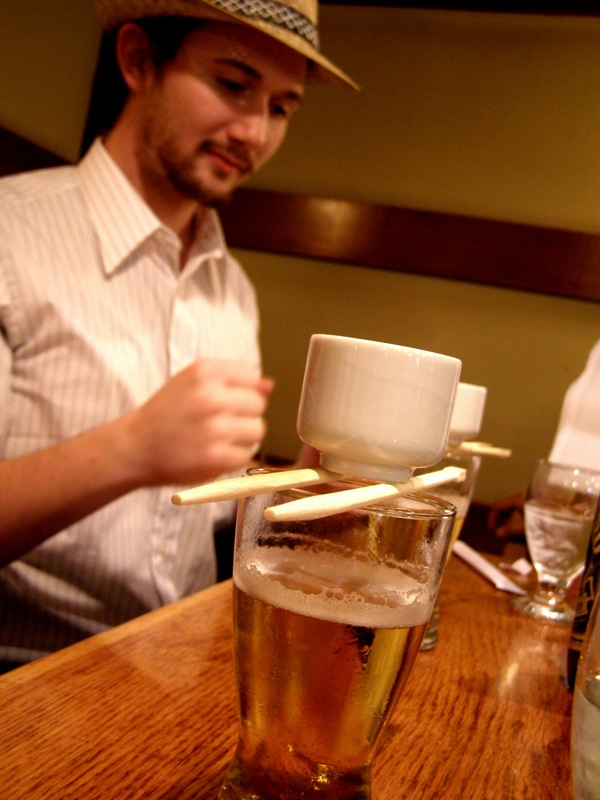
- Type: Beer cocktail
- Ingredients: 1 pint (~16 parts) beer; 1 shot (1.5 parts) sake
- Base spirit: Beer, Sake
- Standard drinkware: A pint glass and a shot glass.
- Served: Neat: undiluted and without ice
- Preparation: The shot of sake is dropped into the beer, causing it to fizz violently. The drink should then be consumed immediately.

The sake bomb or sake bomber is a beer cocktail made by dropping a shot glass of sake into a glass of beer.

== Preparation ==
Two chopsticks are placed parallel on top of the glass of beer, and the shot glass is placed on top of them. The drinker slams the table with their fists, causing the sake to fall into the beer. It should be drunk immediately. The drinker may count to three in Japanese, "ichi (一)...ni (ニ)...san (三)...sake bomb!" Or they may simply yell "Kanpai!" (乾杯, a Japanese toast, from Chinese words meaning "dry cup"). The sake bomb chant may also be said before drinking. The chant has one person say "sake" and others say "bomb", before consuming the drink. It is usually made with cold sake.

A variation of the sake bomb is to "bomb" a shot of warm sake into a chilled Red Bull energy drink.

== See also ==
- Beer cocktail
- Boilermaker
- Irish car bomb
- Jägerbomb
- Queen Mary (beer cocktail)
- Tamagozake
