= Poktanju =

Korean mixed drink

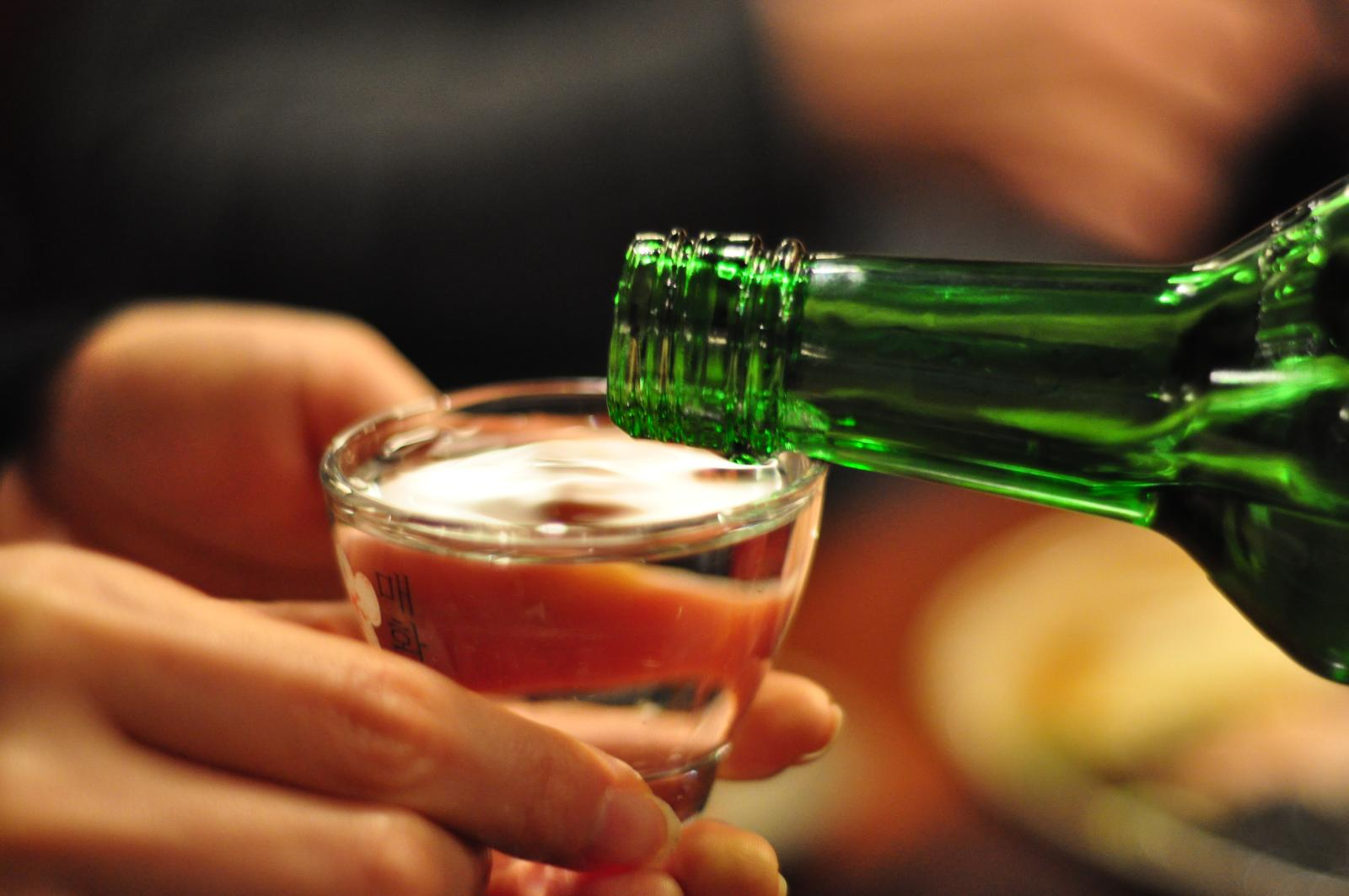
- Shot of soju being added to a pint of beer to make poktanju cocktail

Korean name
- Hangul: 폭탄주
- Hanja: 爆彈酒
- RR: poktanju
- MR: p'okt'anju

Poktanju (Korean: 폭탄주; lit. 'bomb liquor or bomb shot') is a cocktail that is made by mixing soju or whiskey and beer. A poktanju consists of a shot glass of soju or whiskey dropped into a pint of beer; it is drunk quickly. It is considered to be a ritual drinking activity among office workers, friends, and colleagues. Other possible names for poktanju are boilermaker, bomb shot, bomb drink or somaek.

== Korean society and drinking culture ==
In Korea, the act of partaking in drinking is the equivalent of socializing over dinner. Many Koreans view drinking as the quickest way to solidify bonds between family members, friends, and colleagues. "According to a 2013 survey...conducted in collaboration with the Korea Alcohol and Liquor Industry Association, a large majority of Korean people (71.8 percent) regard drinking as a necessary element of social life in Korea, particularly significant for men (65.8 percent)". In a study to identify behaviors and the culture of drinking alcohol in Korean People it was found that most behaviors were in the domain of leisure time. "Drinking for two or more times a month and binge drinking were mainly concentrated in five occasions types: going out with friends (44.2%), going out with colleague (34.2%), drinking at home or friend's home with friends (32.9%), drinking at home alone (29.3%), and drinking with meals at home (27.5%)". Social gatherings including alcohol usually involve participants becoming exceedingly drunk. Ritual Drinking, such as the poktanju, has been integral to the drinking culture of Korea. Since many Koreans feel being drunk is necessary in order to be openly honest with the individuals they are socializing with, poktanju became the cheap, ideal alternative to expensive drinks like whiskey, allowing individuals to become drunk inexpensively.

=== Rite of passage ===
Poktanju is consumed in the traditional Korean "bottoms up style" often referred to as "one shot". The consumer downs the cocktail quickly "then shakes the empty glass with the shot still inside to make a ringing sound, followed by applause of other drinking partners, and it is passed to the next person." Poktanju, or the "bomb-drink" came about due to social meetings resulting in heavy drinking. "As its name suggests, its main goal is to bombard the drinker with a heavy dose of alcohol until he or she nearly passes out". "A foreigner traveling in Korea and socializing with the locals is likely to be bombarded with such cocktails, which have long been a hallmark of the Korean drinking culture". In March when universities welcome new students, welcoming ceremonies are conducted. "The welcoming ceremonies usually involve binge-drinking events, which generally take the form of all-night sessions in a bar downing boilermaker "bombs". In the military, "Poktanju symbolized power". "The profiles of those who became a high-ranking position or a head of a power organization or such candidates used to include how much they can drink it". "A person who can drink dozens of glasses of alcohol was considered a broad-minded big man".

== Origins ==
The origins of poktanju begin first with the origins of soju, the primary ingredient in Korean bomb shot. "Soju is distilled from rice, barley, and koji (a cultured grain), and cheaper brands are made from sweet potatoes". "Soju originated in 14th century Goryeo, when Mongol invaders led by Genghis Khan introduced the Levantine distilling technique from Arabia to the Korean Peninsula". Over time, Koreans learned to distill soju from rice and other grains and eventually we have the popular distilled rice wine that exists today.

There are three theories as to how poktanju originally became a cultural phenomenon in Korea, though the agreeance between the theories is that it originated sometime between the 1960's and the 1980's. The first theory is that poktanju emerged when binge drinking became a trend in Korea amongst salaried workers. "Amid rapid economic growth, salaried workers were forced to work hard and found no way to relieve their mounting stress other than heavy drinking"; poktanju became the inexpensive way for workers to bombard their senses and binge on alcohol. The second theory of the origins of poktanju are that it began in the Korean military. "It is believed that the military introduced poktanju to Korean society first. Portal websites also say soldiers who studied in the U.S. in the 1960s and 70s first introduced it to Korea". The third theory is that the "current style of poktanju ― beer with a shot of whisky ― made its Korean debut in the early 1980s, at a meeting between prosecutors, policemen and journalists in Chuncheon, Gangwon province".
