= Jägerbomb =

Bomb mixed drink

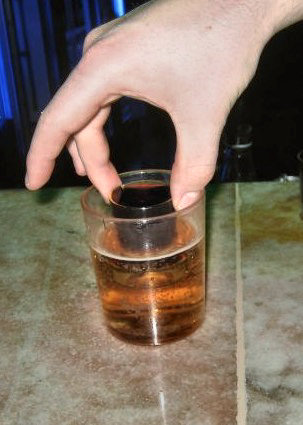
- A shot of Jägermeister dropped into a glass of Red Bull, creating a Jägerbomb
- Standard drinkware: A pub glass and a shot glass.

A Jägerbomb (/ˈjeɪɡərˌbɒm/) is a bomb mixed drink made by dropping a shot of Jägermeister into an energy drink, typically Red Bull.

A Jägerbomb is typically served with a can of Red Bull or a similar style energy drink, poured into a pint glass and accompanied by Jägermeister in a shot glass. The glass of Jägermeister is dropped into the Red Bull by the bartender or the customer. The drink is said to have been invented around 1997, possibly in Northern California. Early versions included dropping the shot into a beer.

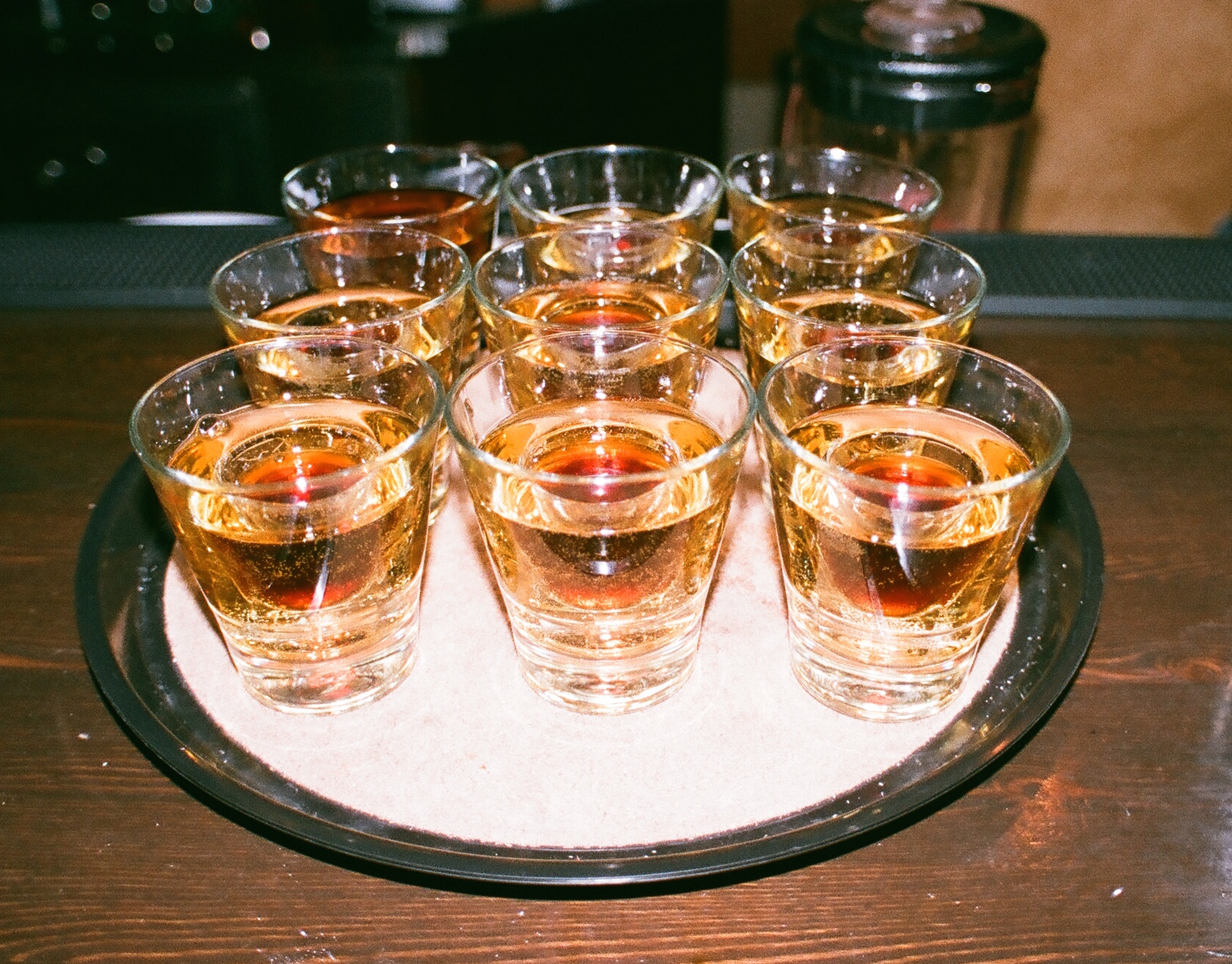
Jägerbomb cocktails at a bar in Athens, Greece

== See also ==
- Ban on caffeinated alcoholic drinks in the United States
- Irish car bomb
- Sake bomb
- Rev-bomb
