= Irish car bomb (cocktail) =

Cocktail made by mixing stout, whiskey, and Irish cream

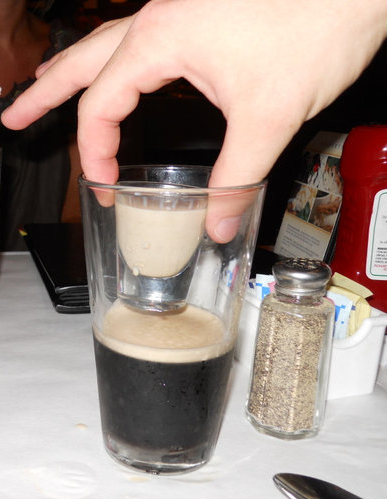
- An Irish car bomb with Baileys Irish Cream.
- Type: Beer cocktail
- Ingredients: Guinness stout, Baileys Irish Cream, and Jameson Irish Whiskey
- Standard drinkware: A pub glass and a shot glass.
- Preparation: The whiskey is floated on top of the Irish cream in a shot glass, and the shot glass is then dropped into the stout

An Irish car bomb, Irish slammer, Irish bomb shot, or Dublin drop is a cocktail, similar to a boilermaker, made by dropping a bomb shot of Irish cream and Irish whiskey into a glass of Irish stout.

== History ==
The cocktail was invented in the US in 1979 in Wilson's Saloon in Norwich, Connecticut by Charles Burke Cronin Oat. He had originally created a mixed shot drink called a Grandfather combining Baileys Irish Cream and Kahlúa. On 17 March 1977 (Saint Patrick's Day), he added Jameson Irish Whiskey to the drink, calling this drink "the IRA." In 1979, Oat spontaneously dropped this shot into a partially-drunk Guinness, calling the result a Belfast Carbomb or Irish Carbomb.

== Name ==
The "Irish" in the name refers to the drink's Irish ingredients; typically Guinness stout, Baileys Irish Cream, and Jameson Irish Whiskey. The term "car bomb" combines reference to its "bomb shot" style, as well as the noted car bombings of Northern Ireland's Troubles.

The name is considered by many to be offensive, with many bartenders refusing to serve it. Some people, including Irish comedians, have likened it to ordering an "Isis" or "Twin Towers" in an American bar and warned that ordering one is the "quickest way to get thrown out of a pub (or get a black eye) in Ireland".

In 2014, The Junction nightclub in Oxford included the drink in promotional material for St. Patrick's Day. This drew complaints, followed by withdrawal of the promotion and a public apology by the bar manager.

The drink is known by other names, including: "Irish slammer", "Dublin drop", or simply the "Irish bomb" to avoid offending patrons.

== Preparation ==
The whiskey is layered over the Irish cream in a shot glass, and the shot glass is then dropped into a glass of stout. The drink should be consumed quickly as the acidity of the beer will cause the cream to curdle within a short time.

While Kahlúa was part of the original recipe, it is often excluded from the drink today. Some refer to the original recipe as a Belfast car bomb.

== See also ==
- Jägerbomb
- List of cocktails
- Queen Mary (cocktail)
- Sake bomb
