= Bierlikör =

Type of liqueur

Bierlikör, or beer liqueur, is a beer-flavored liqueur, traditionally produced in the German state of Bavaria.

== History ==
Bierlikör has long existed as a niche, side product for breweries. Old or unsold beer was frequently made into Bierbrand or Bierlikör, both of which have a longer shelf life. A reference book from 1900 mentions a "Bier-Essenz", which is combined with neutral grain alcohol and sugar to produce a Bier-Likör. The rising popularity of craft beer in the 2010s in Germany has seen a revival of Bierlikör.

== Production ==
The European Union directive on spirits does not define Bierlikör as a product type, nor does it list it as a protected designation of origin product.

The typical beer flavor of Bierlikör can come from different sources, such as beer, malt beer, malt extracts, hops, or unfermented wort.

== Recipes ==
There are a number of recipes for homemade Bierlikör, mostly using a strong beer as a base (such as Schwarzbier or Bock), which is heated up with sugar and spices, cooled, and fortified with a distilled spirit.
