= Layered drink =

Beverage with separated layers

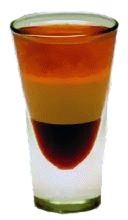
A B-52 is an example of a popular layered drink, with Grand Marnier floating atop Irish cream over a base of coffee liqueur

A layered (or "stacked") drink, sometimes called a pousse-café, is a kind of cocktail in which the slightly different densities of various liqueurs are used to create an array of colored layers, typically two to seven. The specific gravity of the liquid ingredients increases from top to bottom. Liqueurs with the most dissolved sugar and the least alcohol are densest and are put at the bottom. These include fruit juices and cream liqueurs. Those with the least water and the most alcohol, such as rum with 75% alcohol by volume, are floated on top.

These drinks are made primarily for visual enjoyment rather than taste. They are sipped, sometimes through a silver straw, one liqueur at a time. The drink must be made and handled carefully to avoid mixing; however, some layered drinks, such as shooters, are generally drunk quickly.

Mr. Nick Castrogiovanni (1893–1979) was well known in New Orleans as "a mixologist." He was best known for the Pousse-Café, in which liqueurs are layered by specific gravity, and he was known to have layered 34 different liqueurs in a small Pousse-Café glass. He would make the cocktail at his Nick's Original Big Train Bar on Tulane Ave. in New Orleans. This is the largest number of layers currently known to have been accomplished and witnessed.

== Preparation ==
The layers must be poured very gently to avoid mixing. They can be poured over the back of a spoon or down a glass rod.

== Examples of layered drinks ==
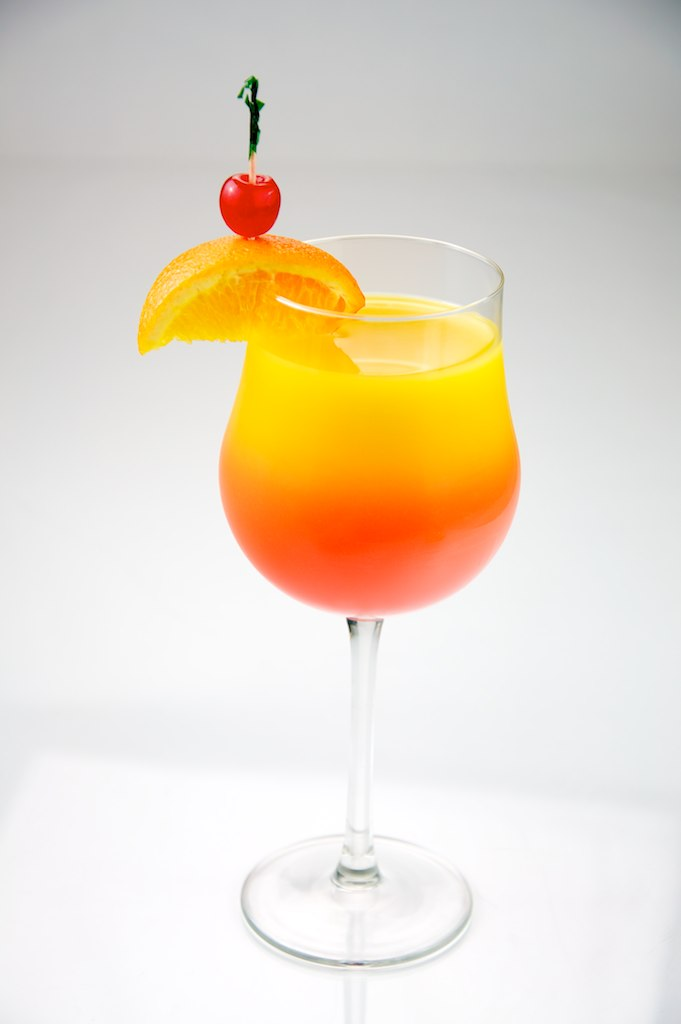
A Tequila Sunrise is a basic layered drink of grenadine syrup (bottom), orange juice, and tequila

- Black and Tan
- Black Velvet
- Blue Eyed Blonde
- B-52
- Oatmeal Cookie
- Pousse-café (1/2 ounce Grenadine, 1/2 ounce yellow chartreuse, 1/2 ounce crème de cassis, 1/2 ounce white creme de menthe, 1/2 ounce green chartreuse, and 1/2 ounce brandy, layered in order given).
- Slippery Nipple
- Tequila Sunrise

== Non-alcoholic ==
Non-alcoholic beverages may also be layered, as in a latte macchiato.

== See also ==
- Mixed drink shooters and drink shots
- List of cocktails
- Flaming beverage
