= Egg in beer =

English idiom

Egg in beer refers to the practice, literally or figuratively, of cracking a raw egg into a glass of beer. The term is used metaphorically, commonly as "what do you want, egg in your beer?" implying that the listener already has something good but is undeservedly asking for more.

== Use ==
=== Literal ===
In England, where the consumption of the egg in beer is centuries old, a mix of beer, raw egg, honey and other herbs could be prescribed to the sick. Posset, famously consumed in Macbeth and The Merry Wives of Windsor, consists partly in eggs whipped with cream, sugar, and beer or wine. Syllabub is made by mixing egg whites cream and wine. The egg also clears out cloudier beers.

According to the Elizabethan theories, out of the four fundamentals characters (sanguine, choleric, melancholic, phlegmatic), eggs are sanguine and beer is choleric.

In 1915, industry journal The Mixer and Server noted a Seattle case where a judge decreed that an egg, once cracked into a glass of beer, qualified as a drink and was not in violation of ordinances against giving free food in bars.

A 1939 article in Printing magazine notes that Pennsylvania State Brewers' Association had launched a public-relations campaign to "sell the idea that eggs and beer make a pleasing combination." Other Pennsylvania sources refer to this as a "miner's breakfast".

Since 1999, Giang Cafe (located in Hanoi, Vietnam) has served an egg beer consisting of beer mixed with whipped egg yolks—a variant on traditional Vietnamese egg coffee.

=== Metaphorical ===
Sources differ as to the origin of the colloquialism, with some stating it dates to World War II while others speculate that it dates to the 19th century. However, a 1933 article in the Stevens Indicator, mentioning an employee who had not received a raise, notes: "What do you expect, Carl? Egg in your beer?"

== Related recipes ==
=== Flips ===
Mixing beer, an egg and liquor is called a "flip". According to The Whistler's lead bartender in Chicago, Marina Holter, flips date back to as far as the 1690s. Some assume that the liquor kills the salmonella risks linked to raw eggs consumption. It may also be a revisited version of the classic raw egg+alcohol consumed across ages and cultures (and referred to as "Fallujah omelets" in the series Orange Is the New Black).

=== Products ===
In 2021, for Easter, Cadbury partnered with Goose Island to release a Creme Egg-flavored beer.
