= Yorsh =

Russian drink of beer and vodka

- Type: Cocktail
- Ingredients: 4 parts pale lager; 1 part vodka (for a more potent Chpock 1 part beer to 2 parts vodka)
- Base spirit: Beer, Vodka
- Preparation: Mix thoroughly and drink quickly.

Yorsh (Russian: Ёрш, lit. ruffe, a kind of freshwater fish) is a Russian mixed drink consisting of beer thoroughly mixed with an ample quantity of vodka. The colloquial term is used similarly to "jungle juice" in English, but the drink varies greatly in composition.

Vodka is a neutral spirit which does not greatly alter the flavor of the beer, but does greatly increase its alcohol content.

The origins of the drink and the etymology of its name are disputed. Pseudonymous author Alkofan suggests that the cocktail was discovered by Russian merchants who, after a meal, poured all the leftover alcohol into a single vessel called "yoursh".

The total amount of alcohol in the traditional version is not very high: a pseudonymous author of the book on the home-made libations suggests mixing 50 grams of vodka with 200 grams of beer. For a heavier "chpock" (Russian: Чпок, an imitation of the popping sound), a more potent mix of just 50 grams of beer to 100 grams of vodka is suggested. The name of the latter drink is related to the way of mixing: after pouring both liquids into a glass, it is supposed to be covered with the palm of the hand, turned over and hit against the knee, producing the desired sound. For a full effect consumption is supposed to be completed quickly, while the bubbles and the foam are still present.

== See also ==
- List of cocktails
- Beer cocktail
- Vodka cocktail
