= Pint glass =

Glassware made to hold a pint of beer or cider

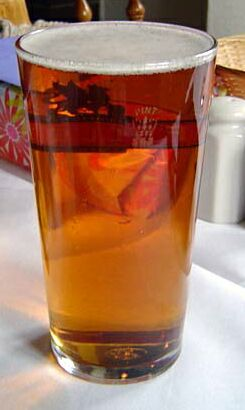
Conical pint glass

A pint glass is a form of drinkware made to hold either a British imperial pint of 20 imperial fluid ounces (568 ml) or a US pint of 16 US fluid ounces (473 ml). Other definitions also exist, see below. These glasses are typically used to serve beer, and also often for cider.

== Current shapes ==
The common shapes of pint glass are:

- Conical (or sleevers) glasses are shaped, as the name suggests, as an inverted truncated cone around 6 inches (15 cm) tall and tapering by about 1 inch (25 mm) in diameter over its height. Also called a "shaker pint" in the United States, as the glass can be used as one half of a Boston shaker. The most common size found in the US holds 16 US fl oz (473 ml) to the rim.
- The nonik (or nonic, pronounced "no-nick") is a variation on the conical design, where the glass bulges out a couple of inches from the top; this is partly for improved grip, partly to prevent the glasses from sticking together when stacked, and partly to give strength and stop the rim from becoming chipped or "nicked". This design was invented by Hugo Pick, of Albert Pick & Co., who was awarded two US patents: design patent 44,616 (2 September 1913) and patent 1,107,700 (18 August 1914), although the design patent was invalidated, and which was commercialized as Nonik (for "no-nick"). The design was preceded by many other bulged glass designs, dating to the mid-19th century, which differed in having a severe bulge and different purposes (a stop for a jar cover, or placement in a soda glass holder), rather than the shallow bulge of this design. The original motivation for the glass was to reduce breakage when stacking (40% greater crushing strength and curved surface where rim touches), reduce breakage when tipped over (due to the bulge protecting the rim from impact), improve grip, and facilitate cleaning (due to shallow curves, compared to more severe curves). In the United Kingdom, this style was popularized after World War II, with Ravenhead Glass introducing a Nonik glass in 1948.
- Jug glasses (or "dimple mugs") are shaped more like a large mug with a handle. They are moulded with a grid pattern of thickened glass on the outside, somewhat resembling the segmentation of a Mills bomb. The dimples prevent the glass slipping out of the fingers in a washing-up bowl, and the design of the glass emphasises strength, helping to withstand frequent manual washing. These design features became less important when manual washing was superseded by machine washing from the 1960s onwards. Dimpled glasses are now rarer than the other types and are regarded as more traditional. This sort of glass is also known as a "handle" or "jug" due to the handle on the glass.
- Tulip glasses are more modern, having a taller shape, and usually flaring out towards the top; these designs are more commonly associated with continental lagers or promotional campaigns by breweries, and are frequently etched or marked with the beer's label.
- Can-shaped glasses are shaped like a standard beer or beverage can, with straight cylindrical sides and an inverted lip. They are less prone to tipping over than a conical glass, and without the need for a heavy base for stability, they are around 40% lighter.

== History ==
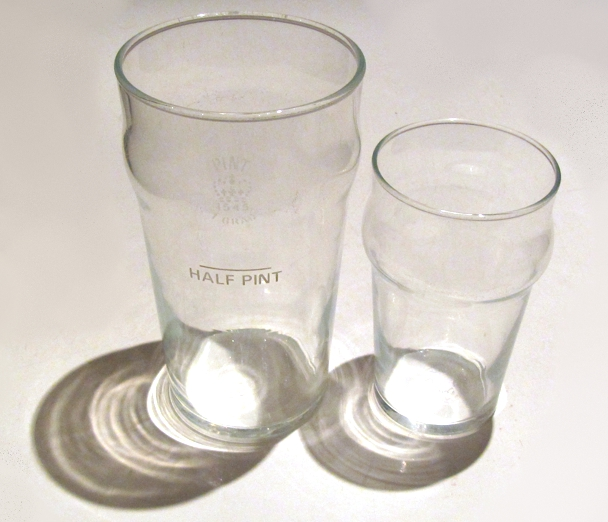
A pint and a half-pint nonik glass

Pint glasses became popular in the United Kingdom in the early to mid-20th century, replacing tankards made from pewter, ceramic and glass. This change was notably lamented by George Orwell in his 1946 essay "The Moon Under Water". Until the 1990s regulars of some UK pubs would keep their own pewter tankard, often engraved with their name or nickname, behind the bar. This practice has largely disappeared with the requirement to sell beer in certified vessels.

=== Older styles ===
Older styles include:

- Decorative Toby jugs, although these would not have been for everyday use. Mid 1700s onwards.
- Pewter tankards. 1500s to 1900s, with some use into the late 20th century. Often including a glass base. Later tankards are made with lead-free pewter alloys.
- Ceramic tankards with strap handles. Late 1800s to early 1900s.
- 10-sided glass tankards. 1920s and 1930s.
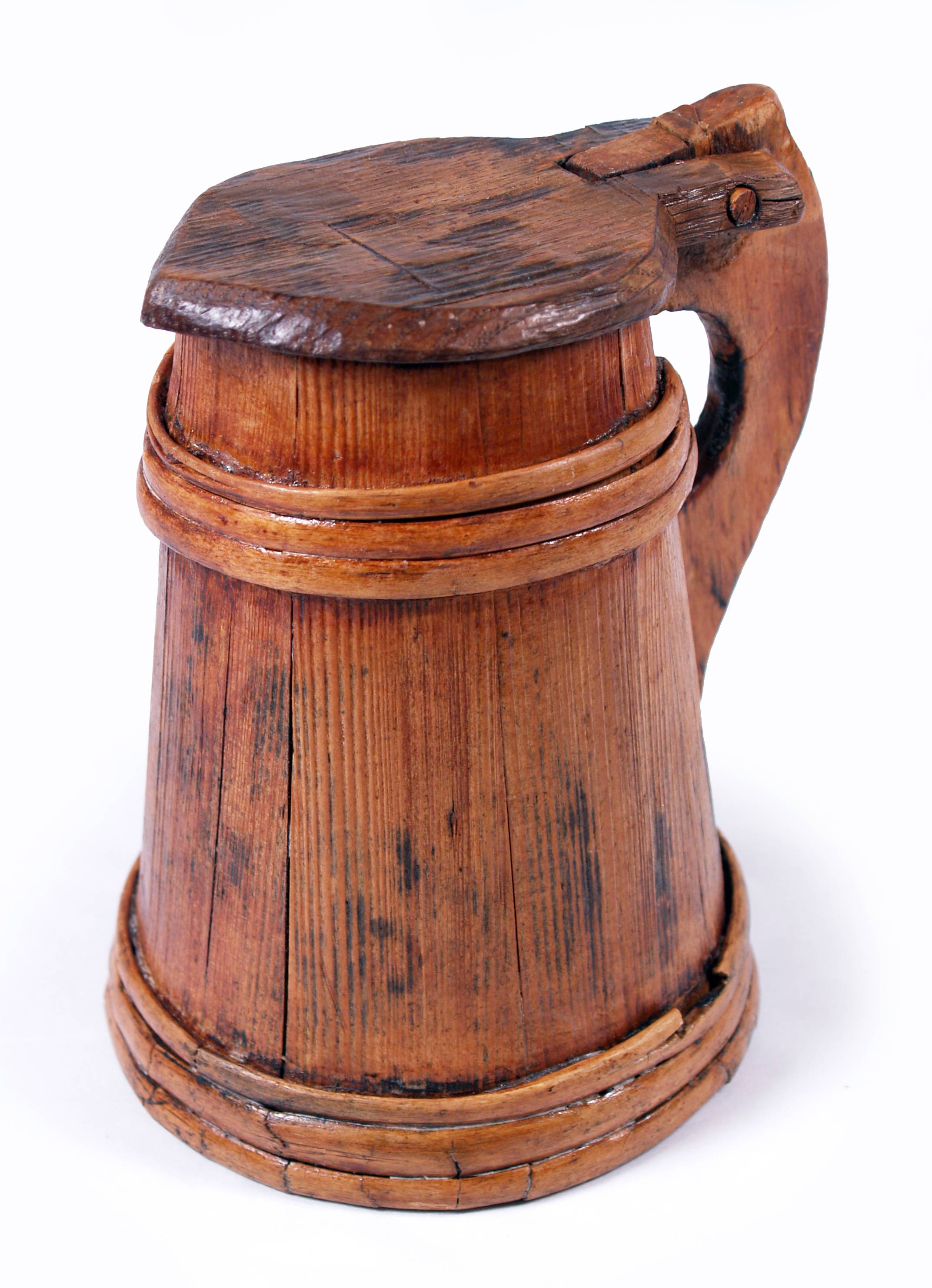
Wooden tankard found on board the 16th century carrack Mary Rose

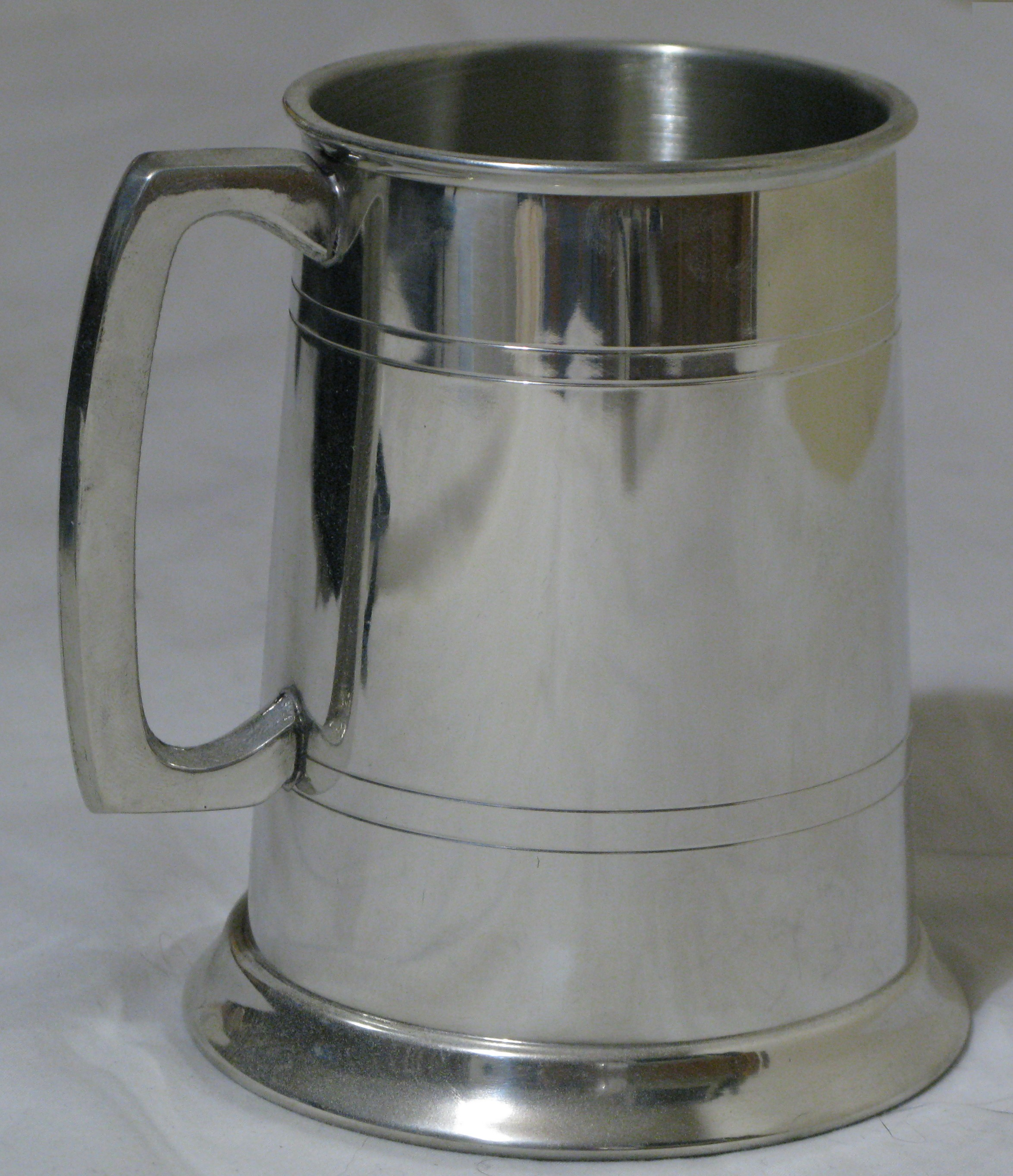
Pewter tankard

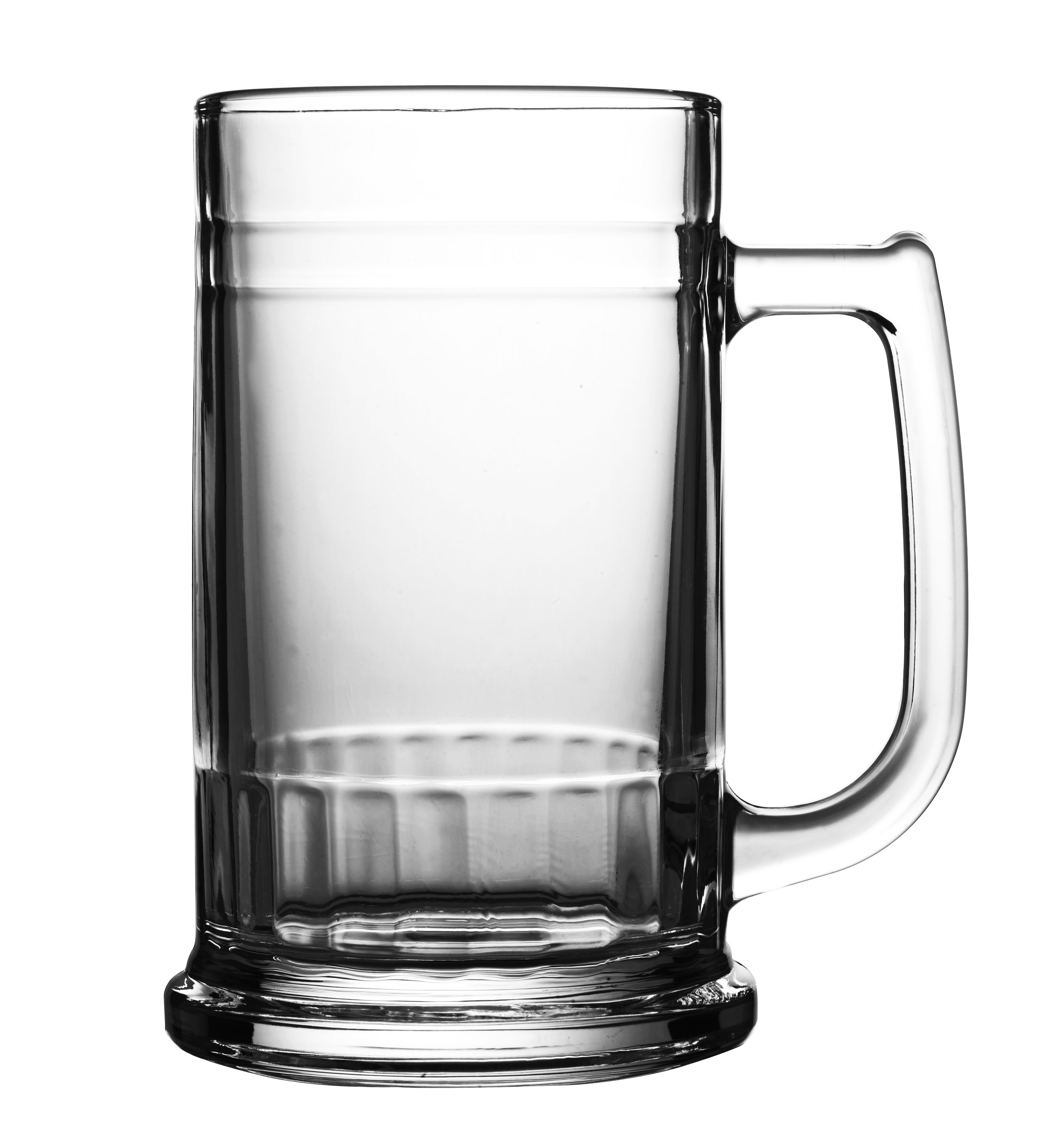
Glass tankard

== United Kingdom law ==
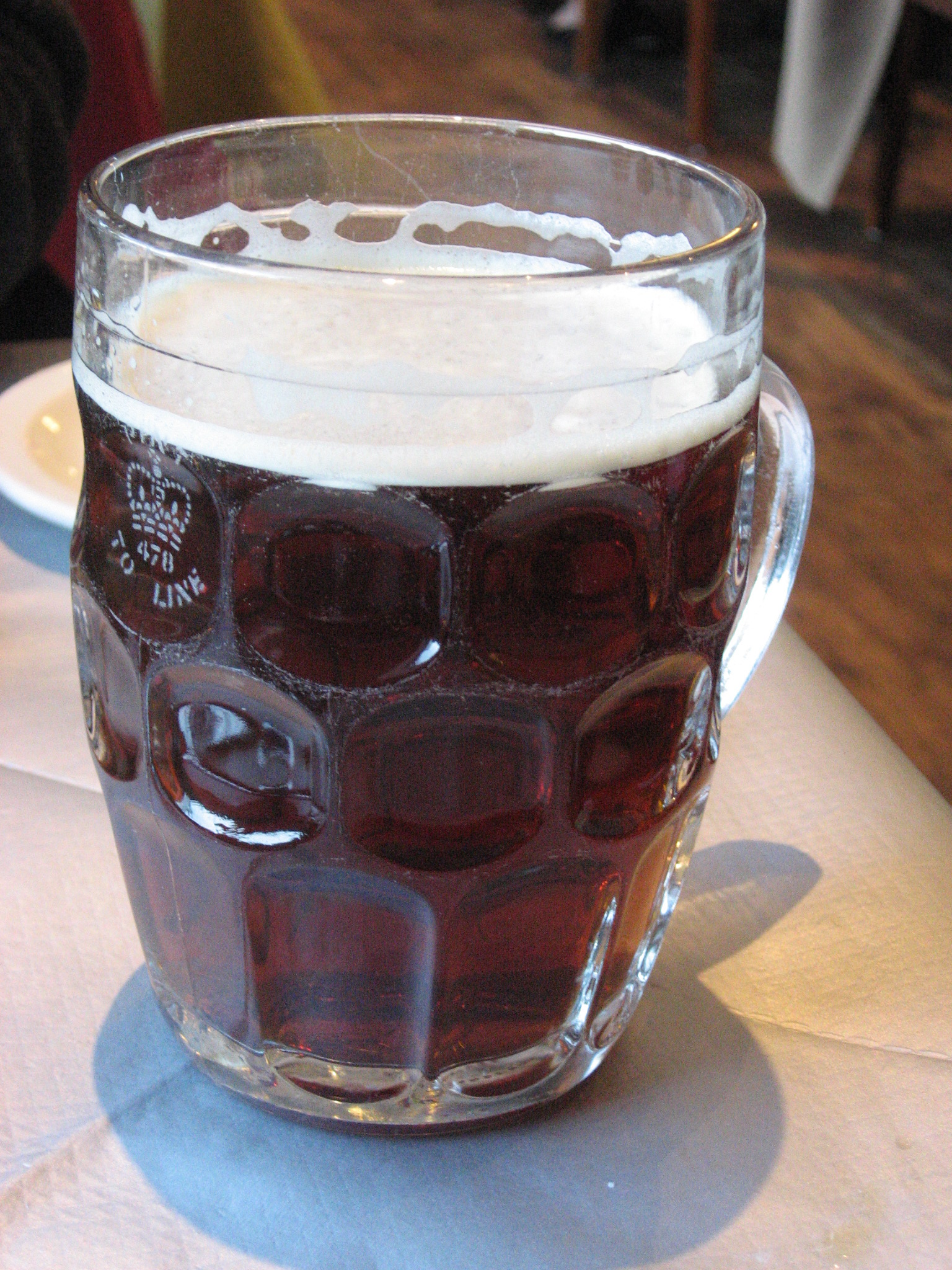
A dimpled glass pint jug with "Pint to Line" and Crown certification mark

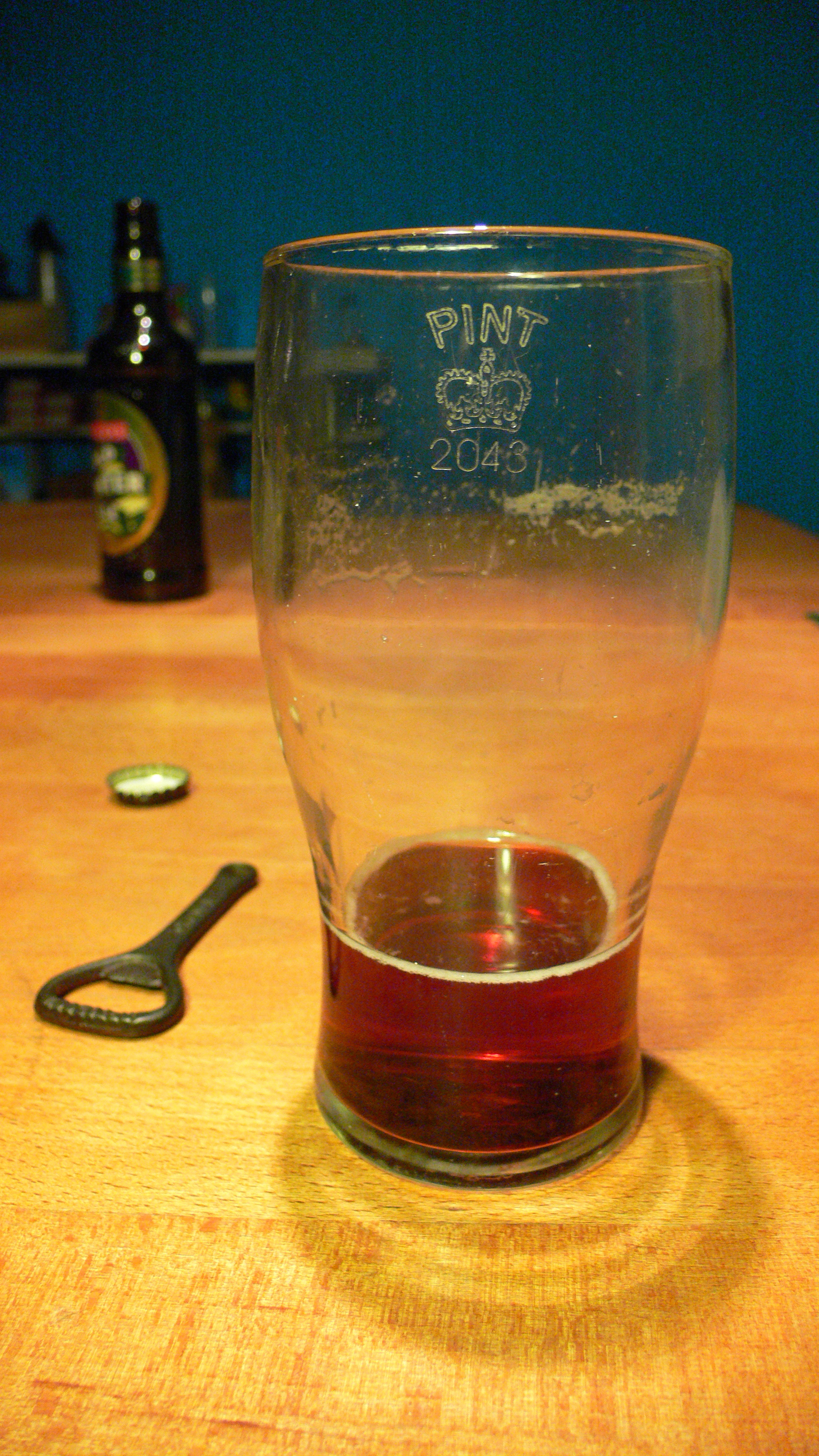
Tulip-shaped glass with the Crown stamp

In the United Kingdom, draught beer must be sold in specific Imperial measures. English, Scottish and Northern Irish legislations all require certain steps be taken to ensure that a pint of beer is indeed a pint. Although this can be achieved using metered dispensers, the more common solution is to use certified one-pint glasses. Until 2007 these had a crown stamp indicating that the certification had been done by an agency of the Crown. The number etched upon the glasses indicates the manufacturing company or site.

Under the European Union (EU) Measuring Instruments Directive (Directive 2004/22/EC), the certification of measuring instruments and devices used in trade (including beer mugs, weighbridges, petrol pumps and the like) can be done by third parties anywhere within the EU with governments taking "only the legislative and enforcement (market surveillance) functions" and "ensuring that the system of third party assessment ... has sufficient technical competence and independence" (or, in simple language, calibration services were privatised). Glasses that have been certified by authorised firms anywhere within the EU have the letters CE and the certifying agency's identification number etched on them. Conservatives campaigning to have dual markings of crown and CE were informed by EU Commissioner Günter Verheugen that "a Crown stamp look-alike could naturally be affixed to the glass, as long as it is done in such a way that it is not confused with the CE marking". Following the withdrawal of the United Kingdom from the EU the CE mark is being replaced by the UKCA marking for goods placed on the market in Great Britain. In September 2021 it was announced that the crown certification mark would return to pint glasses in the UK.

Selling beer in unmeasured glasses without using some other form of calibrated measure is illegal. Half-pint, one-third pint and two-thirds pint (schooners) glasses are also available and are subject to the same laws. Two-thirds of a pint is not equal to the Canadian, US or Australian schooners, which are respectively of different measures. Instead, the term "schooner" is sometimes informally used within the UK to describe two-thirds of a pint (379 ml).

Although the glass must be accurately calibrated, industry guidelines only require a pint to be at least 95% liquid, allowing 5% of the pint to consist of the foamy "head". The Campaign for Real Ale (CAMRA) has described this practice as selling a short measure, and says that it costs drinkers £1 million a day in beer they have paid for but not received. The British Beer and Pub Association has issued guidelines for bar staff to give a "top up" to any drinker who is unsatisfied with the measure they receive.

CAMRA recommends the use of "lined" or "oversized" glasses in pubs. These have a line near the top (usually labelled "pint to line") to which the beer should be poured, with the head forming above it. In the past a number of breweries supplied these glasses to their pubs; this is now rarely the case, and lined glasses are found mostly at enthusiasts' events such as beer festivals, serious cask ale pubs, and breweries' own bars.

== Other countries ==
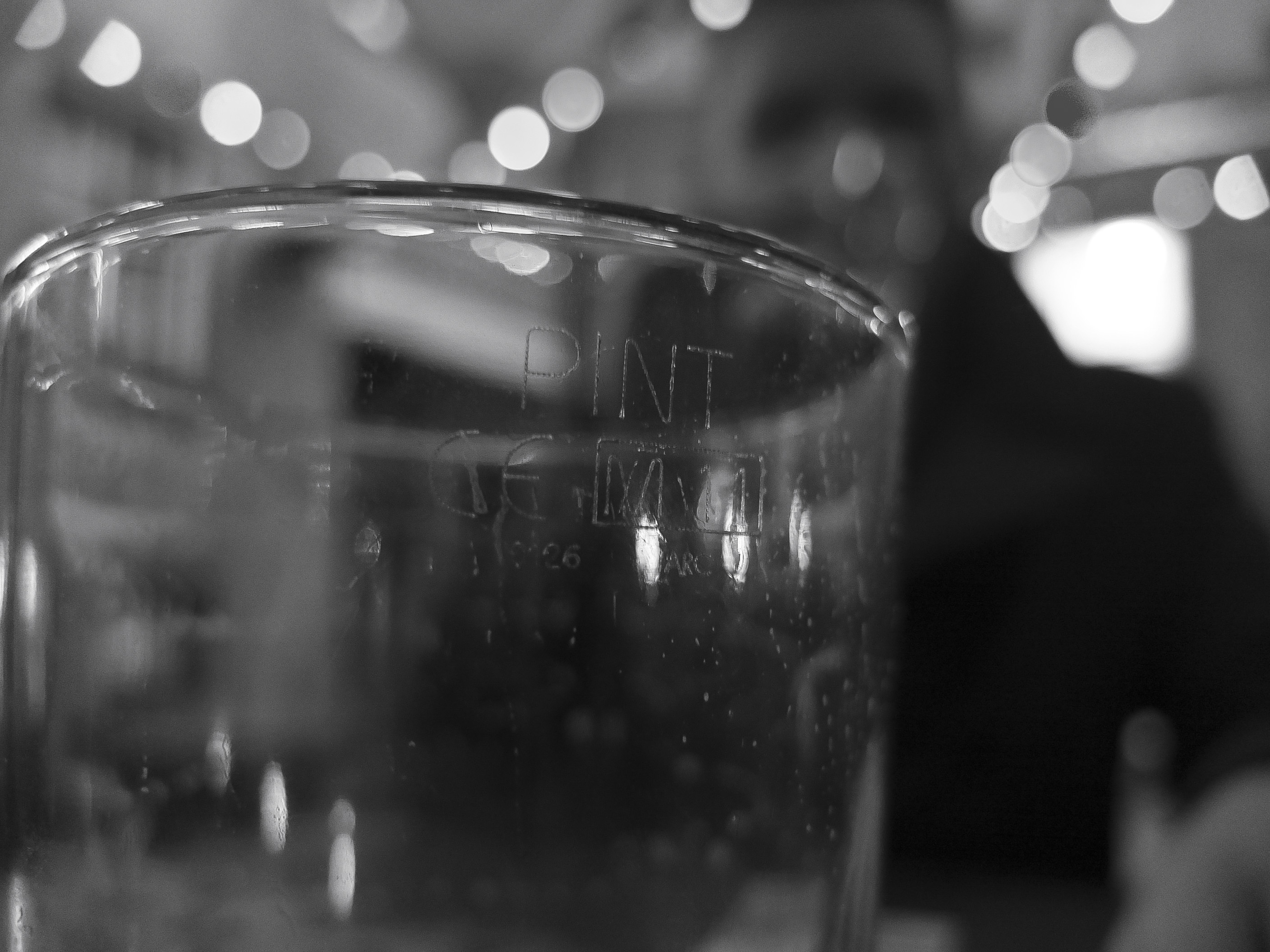
Pint glass with PINT/CE logo stamp (European standard)

Different versions of the pint
Type	Definition	Equals	Comment
Flemish pintje		250 ml	
German Pintchen	Third of a litre	≈ 330 ml	
Israel		360–440 ml	Varies, no fixed definition.
South Australian pint	425 ml	425 ml	
US liquid pint	16 US fl oz	≈ 473 ml	Used in the United States.
US dry pint	18.6 US fl oz	≈ 551 ml	Less common.
Imperial pint	20 imp fl oz	≈ 568 ml	Used in the United Kingdom, Ireland, and Canada.
Australian pint	570 ml	570 ml	Based on the imperial pint rounded to a metric value.
Royal pint or pinte du roi	48 French cubic inches	≈ 952 ml	Varied by region from 0.95 to over 2 liters.
Canadian pinte	Imperial quart	≈ 1136 ml	In French only.
Scottish pint or joug (obsolete)	2 pints and 19.69 imp fl oz	≈ 1696 ml	

Beer in Australia is formally measured in metric units, but draught beer is commonly ordered and sold in glasses approximating imperial measures, including a 570 ml pint. In the state of South Australia, "pint" refers to a 425 ml (3/4 pint) glass, known as a schooner in the rest of Australia. As in the UK, certified glassware must be used; the capacity of the beer glass is defined by either the brim or, where present, the fill line. There are no legally prescribed sizes for beer volumes, but the stated capacities, which are a legal requirement, must be formally tested by the hoteliers and breweries.

In Canada, Federal law mandates a standard imperial pint. However, this law is rarely enforced in some provinces, such as British Columbia, and establishments sometimes sell US pints or other measures as "pints."

The Republic of Ireland uses the imperial 20 fl oz pint measure (≈568 ml), where legal metrology marks are used to show that a glass has passed inspection by the National Standards Authority of Ireland, a state-run body which enforces a number of standard rulings. Starting in 2006, the NSAI "pint" mark, a circle featuring two wavy lines, between which "PINT" is written, with a year mark (last two digits), and a three digit batch code either side; has begun to be phased out with a European standard "PINT"/CE logo stamp. Smaller Pint glasses have been used in pubs and nightclubs though.

In Israel, although officially defined as 568ml, pubs use the term arbitrarily and the "pints" served constitute a wide range of volumes (360ml–440ml). In the past, the custom was to serve beer in 330ml or 500ml in the original beer manufacturer's glass. The tax on alcohol was doubled in July 2012 to ₪4.2 per litre. In order to avoid raising prices at pubs, and as a result, the loss of customers, a new standard beer measurement appeared; the "pint". Customers don't seem to know how much liquid should be in a pint, which varies from place to place. Some venues did not do this, and still serve beer in 500 ml glasses.

In the United States, a pint is 16 US fluid ounces (473 ml). However, the typical conical "pint" glass holds 16 US fl oz only when filled to its rim with liquid. With a half-inch of foam, the actual liquid fill is roughly 14 US fl oz (410 ml), missing one eighth of its volume. In 2008, some restaurants replaced 16-ounce pint glasses with 14-ounce ones, to which customers objected. In response to this, 2014 legislation in the state of Michigan (known for its craft brewing culture) requires bars to serve 16-ounce pints.

== Nucleated pint glasses ==
Nucleated base of a pint glass

It is increasingly common to find pint glasses which contain markings on the base; very often these glasses are branded to one particular beer. The markings themselves are formed from small pits, which aid in nucleation, allowing the gas within it to be released more easily, thus preserving the head. Without the aid of these pits a regular pint glass will keep a head for only 3 or 4 minutes before appearing "flat". The markings come in a variety of styles ranging from a simple circular or square hatched pattern to more complicated branding messages.

== Collecting ==
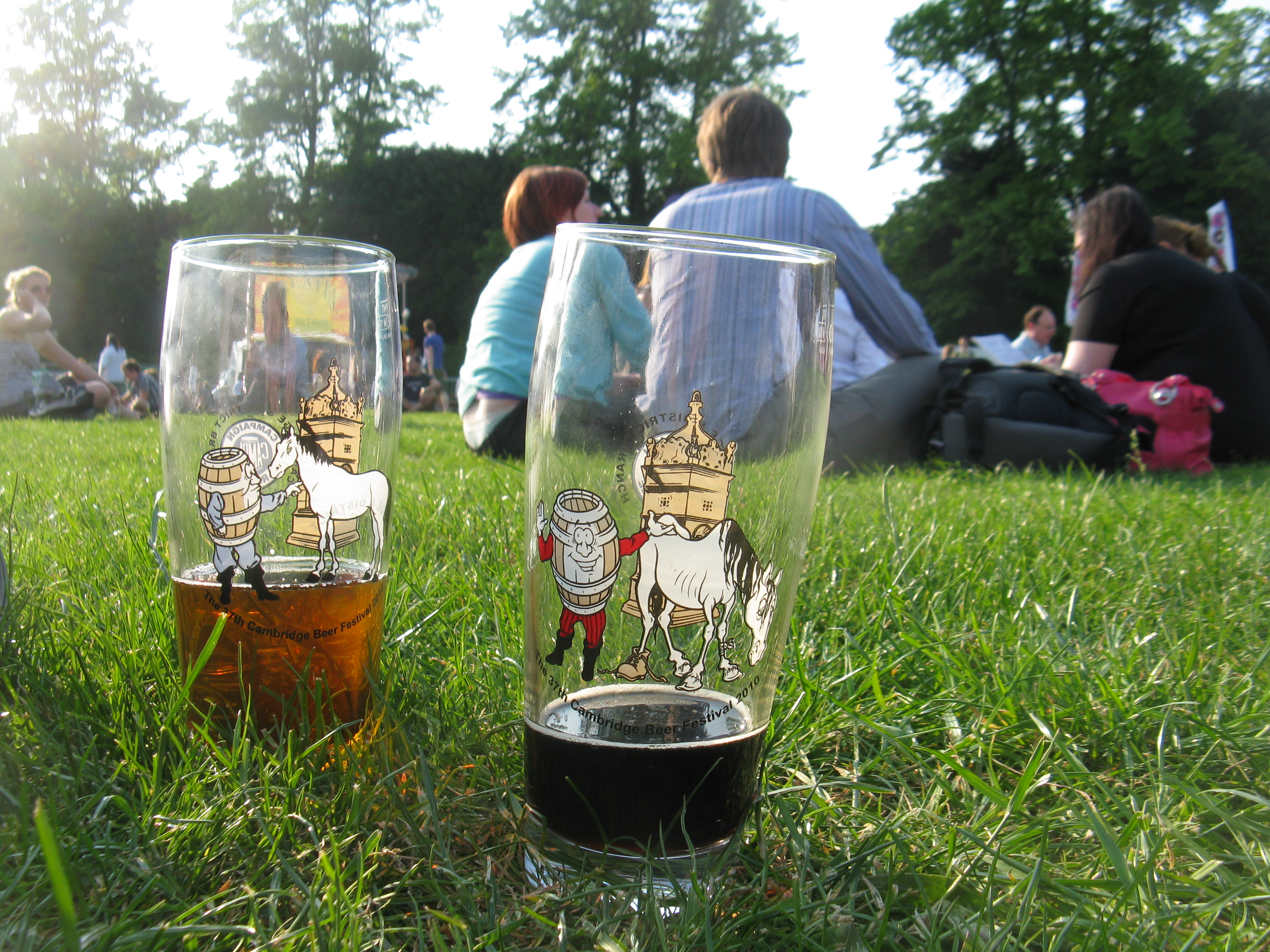
Silk-screen printed glasses from the 2010 Cambridge Beer Festival

Pint glass collecting is a way for individuals to commemorate their visits to popular tourist destinations, most notably to microbreweries or sports arenas. These destinations often sell pint glasses adorned with their logos, which are either screen-printed or engraved on the side of the glass. Brewery enthusiasts may travel thousands of miles to see where their favorite beer is made or to sample new local and fresh beers, and collectors often display their collections (which sometimes total in the hundreds) in display cases or on shelves.

Pint glasses are also often sold as collector or novelty items, sometimes individually or boxed with a pint bottle of beer.

Beer festivals frequently have commemorative pint glasses made specially for the event.

== Use as weapon ==
As with other glass objects such as glass bottles, pint glasses can be used as a weapon, either smashing an intact glass in a victim's face or smashing the glass and then slashing with the shards. Such attacks, called "glassing", are a significant problem in the United Kingdom, with more than 87,000 glassing attacks per year, resulting in over 5,000 injuries. This has led to less-dangerous alternatives being used, either plastic glasses and bottles at large events or violence-prone venues, or treated glass, primarily tempered glass, which has been used in Australia.

== See also ==
- Beer garden
- Shot glass
- List of glassware
