= Shandy =

Beer or cider mixed with lemonade

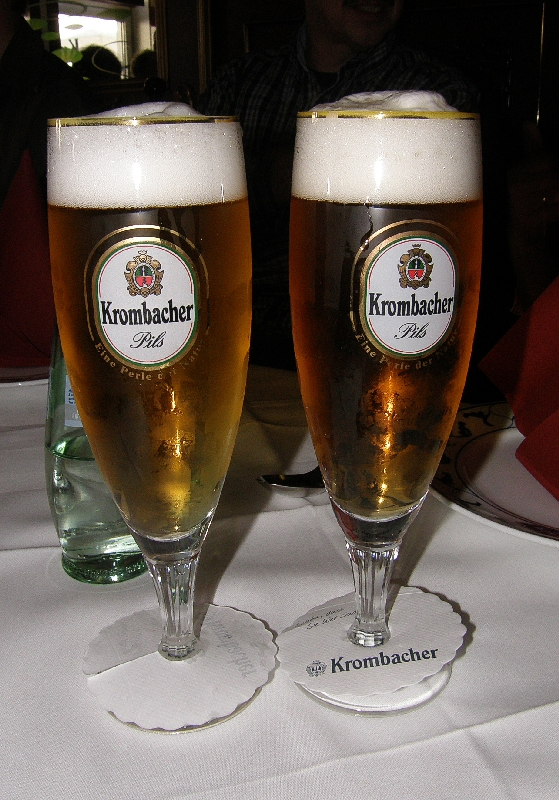
- Comparison of a Radler shandy (left) and a Pilsner (right)
- Type: Cocktail

Shandy is beer mixed with lemonade, resulting in a lower ABV for the finished drink. Shandies are popular in Europe, Australia, New Zealand, South Africa, and the Caribbean. In the UK, they are usually ordered as either "bitter shandy" (equal parts bitter and lemonade) or "lager shandy" (in which lager is the beer).

In some jurisdictions, the low alcohol content of shandies exempts them from laws governing the sale of alcoholic beverages.

== Etymology ==
The term (recorded first in 1888) originated as a shortening of shandygaff, from Britain in 1853 and itself of obscure source.

== Variants by name ==
=== Radler ===
Radler (German: [ˈʁaːdlɐ], lit. German for 'cyclist') has a long history in German-speaking regions. It commonly consists of a 50:50 mixture of beer and a lemon-flavoured soft drink.

The term Radler originates with a drink called Radlermass ('cyclist litre') that was created by Franz Kugler, an innkeeper, in the small town of Deisenhofen, just outside Munich. During the great cycling boom of the Roaring Twenties, Kugler created a bicycle trail from Munich through the woods that led directly to his drinking establishment.

While the term Radler has been widely attributed to Kugler, the combination of beer and soft drink is documented in texts dating from 1912. Radler is consumed not only in Bavaria, but also in other parts of Germany, Austria, Czechia, Hungary, Italy, Slovakia, Slovenia, Croatia, Serbia, North Macedonia, Poland, Portugal, Netherlands, Norway, Bulgaria, the United States, Canada, and Romania.

In northern Germany, a half-and-half mixture of Pilsner beer and soft drink is known as an Alster (short for Alsterwasser, German: [ˈalstɐˌvasɐ], German for 'water from the Alster', a river in Hamburg). Regionally the Radler and Alster may refer to shandies made with either citrus or orange flavoured softdrinks, with the two terms either contrasting or referring to the same drink. In Austria, a saurer Radler is a mix of lager and soda water.

In Austria, a variant, sometimes called Almradler, is popular, using Almdudler instead of lemonade. Radler is very popular during the summer months due to its low alcohol content and reputation for being a "thirst-quencher".

In New Zealand, the word "radler" was trademarked by DB Breweries for their "Monteith's Radler" beer, which is a citrus-flavoured, full-strength (5%) beer. This has led to some brewers to use the names "reldar" (Radler spelled backwards) and "Cyclist" (the literal meaning of Radler).

In the Netherlands, shandy and Radler are largely seen as two different drinks, shandy being a 0.5% alcohol drink popular as a children's drink during the 70s, as beverages not exceeding 0.5% alcohol were officially seen as non-alcoholic. The classic German Radler is increasingly also sold there as a pre-mixed drink made by most large Dutch beer brewers in a growing number of varieties.

=== Russ ===
In Bavaria, the southeastern state of Germany, as well as in the countryside of Austria, a mix of 50% Weißbier and 50% lemonade is called a "Russ". There are three different theories about the origin of this name:

- Due to a shortage of raw materials that occurred during the great inflation between 1921 and 1923, Weißbier became more popular. To further reduce material efforts, the Weißbier was thinned with lemonade. The name "Russ" may derive from the popularity of the drink among Russian workers in Germany at that time.
- Another theory of the name's origin is that the drink initially was called "Riesen-Maß" (Riesen = giant), as the drink mixture frothed heavily.
- The most popular theory is that the drink was first served in the Mathäser-Keller in Munich after the 1918 Revolution when Communists came together.

=== Shandyade ===
Scottish manufacturer A.G. Barr produces a soft drink known as "Shandyade". Shandyade is a non-alcoholic, carbonated soft drink flavored to mimic the taste of a traditional shandy. This is done through using malt flavouring. Shandyade prior to 2022 was branded as "Barr Shandy" and contained a small amount of real beer.

=== Shandygaff ===
A Shandygaff is an older British name for beer mixed with ginger beer or ginger ale; the earliest written record of the word dates back to 1853. In H. G. Wells’ comic novel The History of Mr Polly, Wells refers to Shandygaff as "two bottles of beer mixed with ginger beer in a round-bellied jug".

=== Lager top ===
In England, Wales and Scotland, a lager top is a lager with a dash of lemonade on top, the latter of which reduces the lager's hardness.

=== Panaché ===
In France, Switzerland and parts of Italy, a mix of beer and soda (lemonade, Sprite, etc.) is called a panaché. This name, meaning "mixed harmoniously" in French, was also adopted in Portugal due to the influence of French culture in the area.

=== Monaco ===
In France, a 50/50 mix of lager and carbonated lemonade with a dash of grenadine is called a Monaco.

=== Clara ===
In Spain, a clara is typically any mixture of beer with a sweet-tasting carbonated soft drink (in order to reduce the bitterness of the hops). The addition of soda lightens the color of the beer, hence its name (clara means "clear" in Spanish). It is usually served as a refreshment in the hot summer months, being a very popular drink. Other regions have different names for the mixture, and there is a debate over whether a clara refers to beer with lemon, or beer with a soft drink.

== See also ==
- Beer cocktail
- Michelada
- Queen Mary (cocktail)
