= Mixed drink =

Beverage comprising a mixture of ingredients

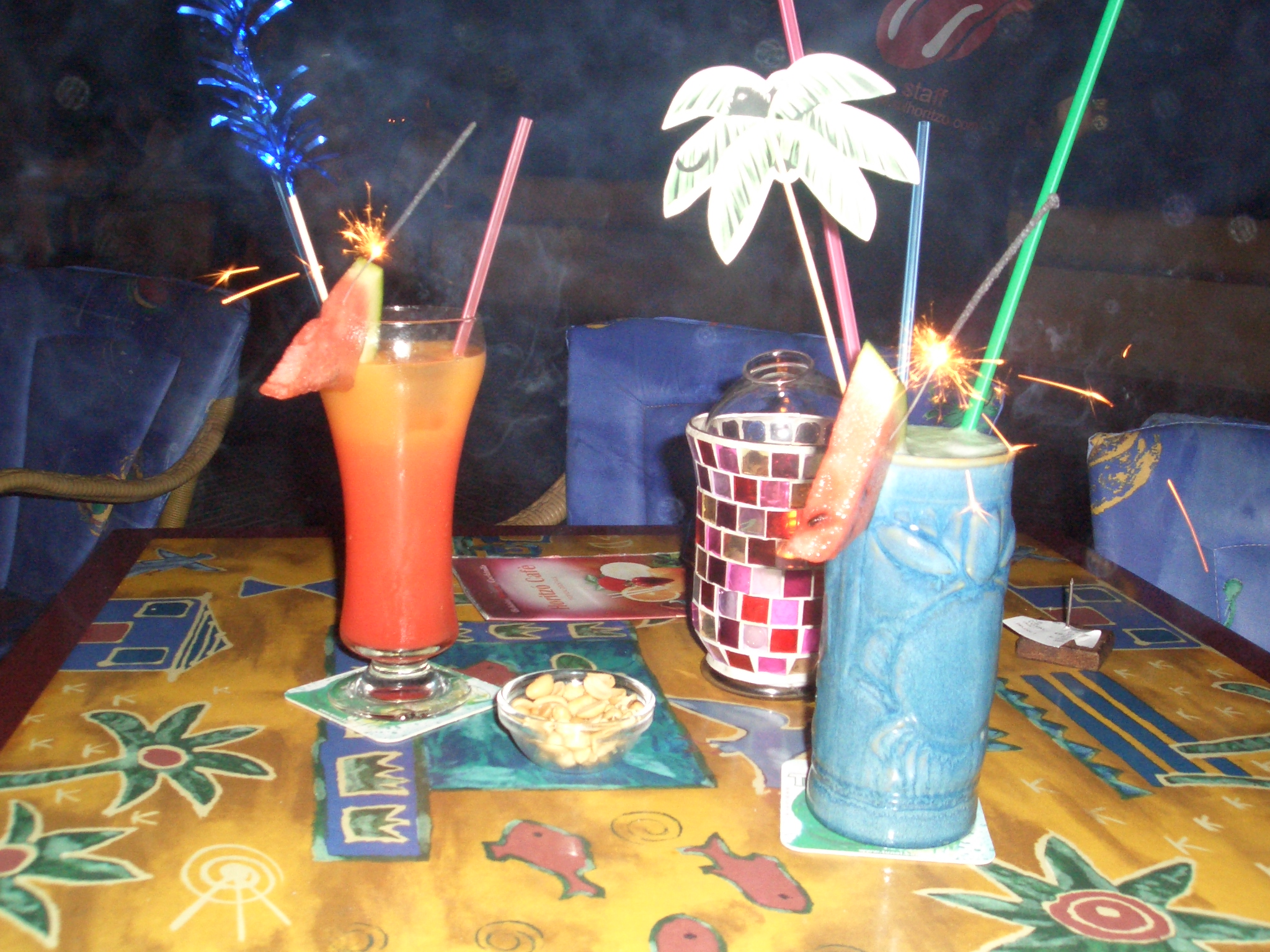
Mixed drinks come in a wide variety of shapes and sizes, and they may be either alcoholic or non-alcoholic.

A mixed drink is a beverage in which two or more ingredients are mixed.

== Types ==
- List of non-alcoholic mixed drinks—A non-alcoholic mixed drink (also known as virgin cocktail, temperance drink, or mocktail) is a cocktail-style beverage made without alcoholic ingredients.
- Soft drink

=== Caffeinated ===
- Coffee drinks: Iced coffee
- List of chocolate drinks — chocolate contains a small amount of caffeine
- Energy drink
- Teas

=== Herbal ===
- Kava — not traditionally flavored, however, it is occasionally flavored like alcoholic drinks.

==== Alcoholic ====
A "spirit and mixer" is any combination of one alcoholic spirit with one non-alcoholic component, such as gin and tonic, whereas a cocktail generally comprises three or more liquid ingredients, at least one of which is alcoholic.

- List of cocktails
- List of beer cocktails
- List of flaming beverages
- List of national drinks
- List of wine cocktails

== Supplies ==
- List of glassware
- List of common edible cocktail garnishes
- List of common inedible cocktail garnishes

== See also ==
- List of beverages
