= Shot glass =

Short tumbler used for serving spirits

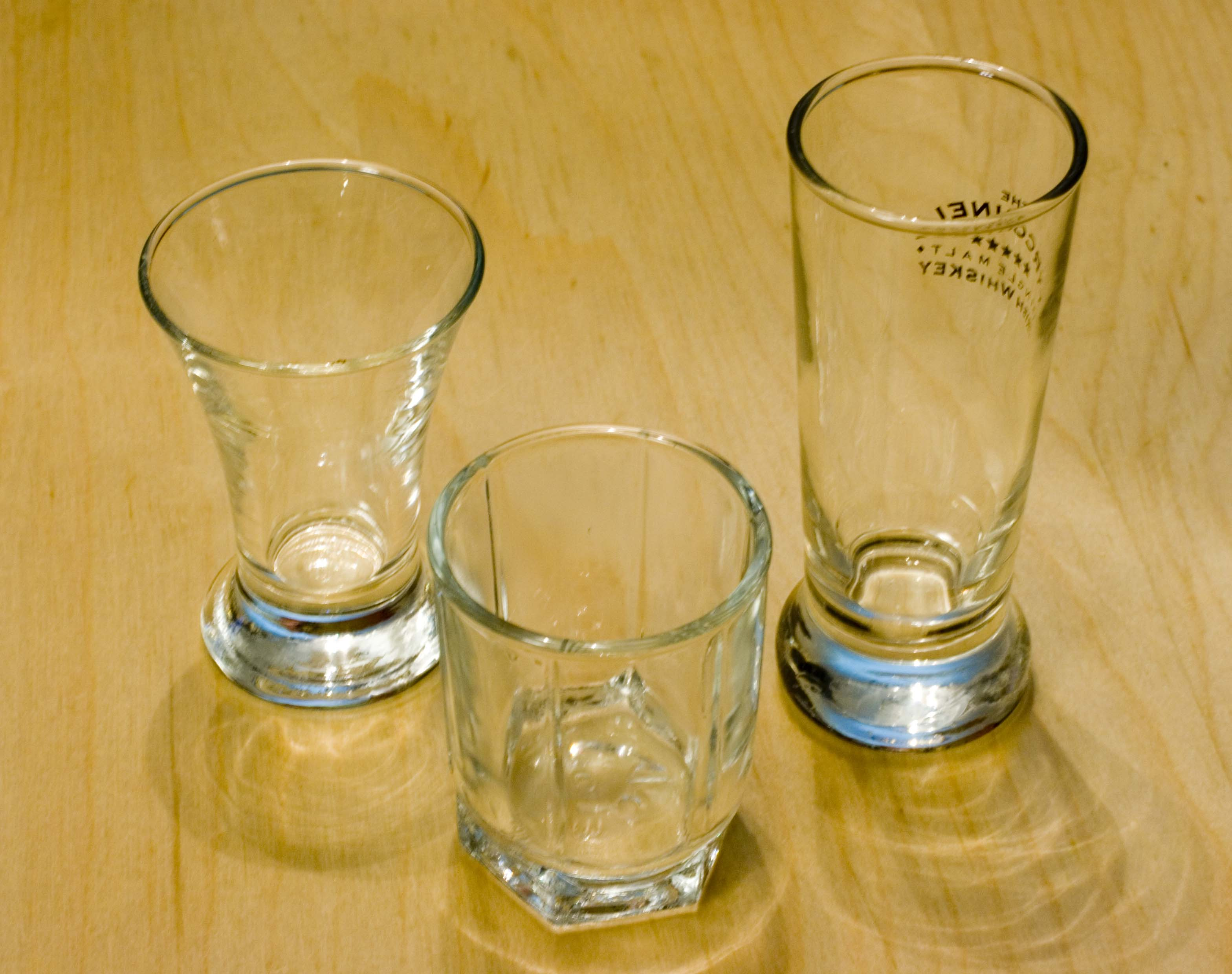
- Three shot glasses of varying shape and size
- Type: Drinkware

A shot glass is a glass originally designed to hold or measure spirits or liquor, which is either imbibed straight from the glass ("a shot") or poured into a cocktail ("a drink"). An alcoholic beverage served in a shot glass and typically consumed quickly, in one swallow, may also be known as a "shooter" or “shot”.

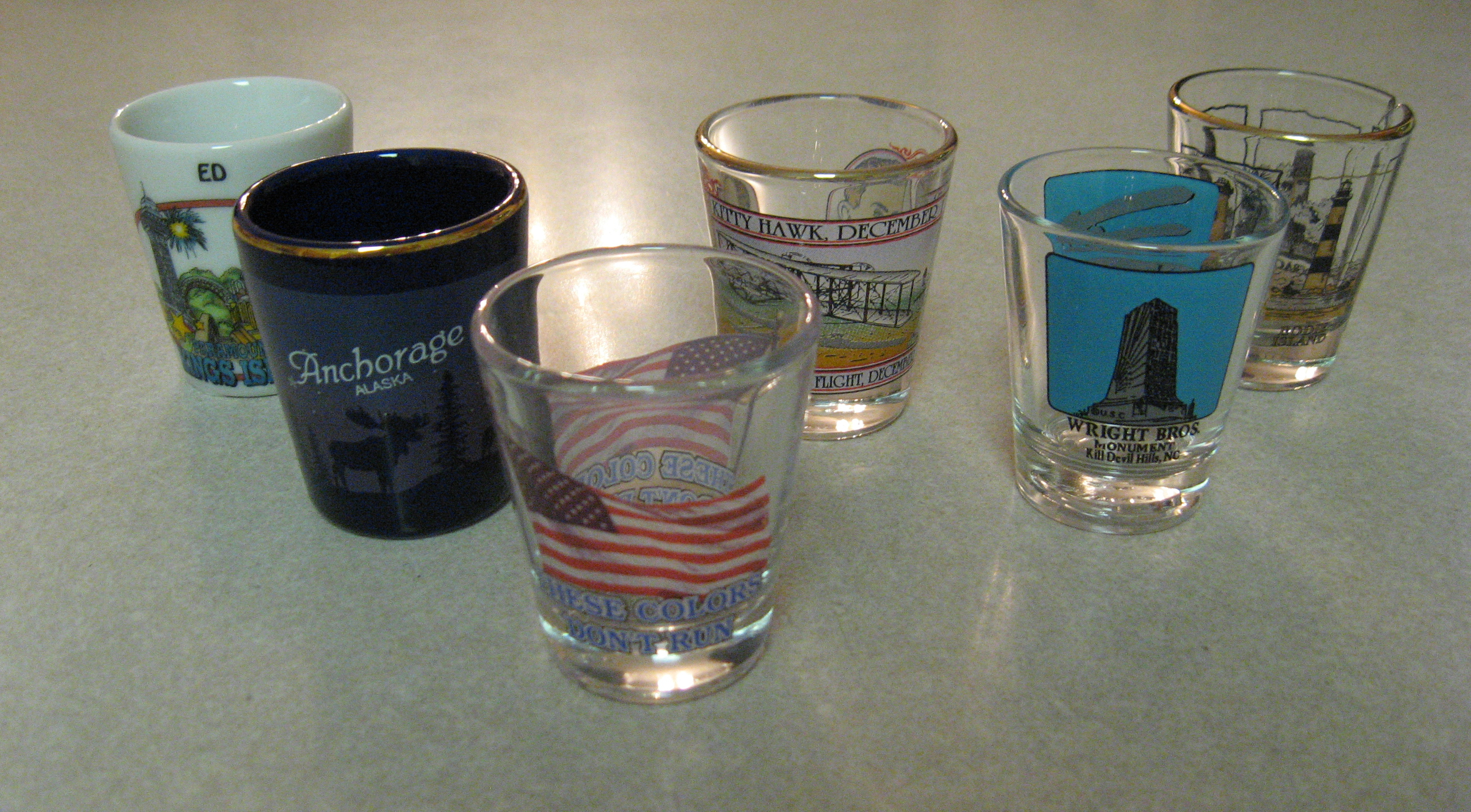
Shot glasses with a variety of designs. Shot glasses such as these are often collected as novelty items.

Shot glasses decorated with a wide variety of toasts, advertisements, humorous pictures, or other decorations and words are popular souvenirs and collectibles, especially as merchandise of a brewery.

== Name origin ==
The word shot, meaning a drink of alcohol, has been used since at least the 17th century, taken from the Old English 'sceot' and is related to the German word Geschoss.

== History ==
Some of the earliest whiskey glasses in America from the late 1700s to early 1800s were called "whiskey tasters" or "whiskey tumblers" and were hand blown. They are thick, similar to today's shot glasses, but will show a pontil mark or scar on the bottom, or a cupped area on the bottom where the pontil mark was ground and polished off. Some of these glasses even have hand-applied handles and decorations hand crafted using a grinding wheel.

In the early to mid-1800s, glass blowers began to use molds and several different patterns of "whiskey tasters" in several different colors were being made in molds. These glasses are also thick like today's shot glass but they will have rough pontiled bottoms from being hand blown into the mold. By the 1870s to 1890s as glass making technology improved, the rough pontiled bottoms largely disappeared from glasses and bottles.

== Shot-measuring tools ==
=== Jigger ===
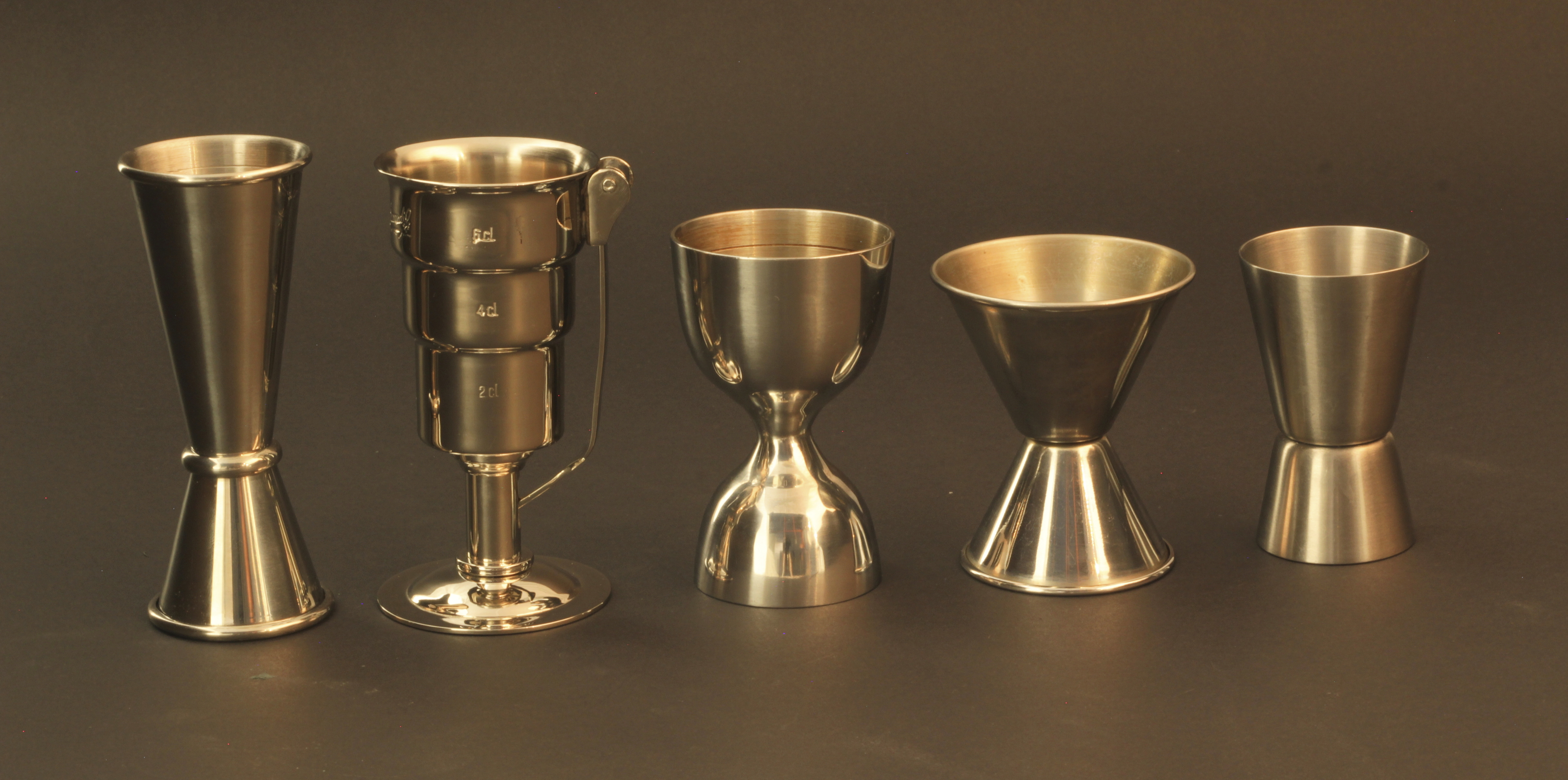
Variety of jiggers

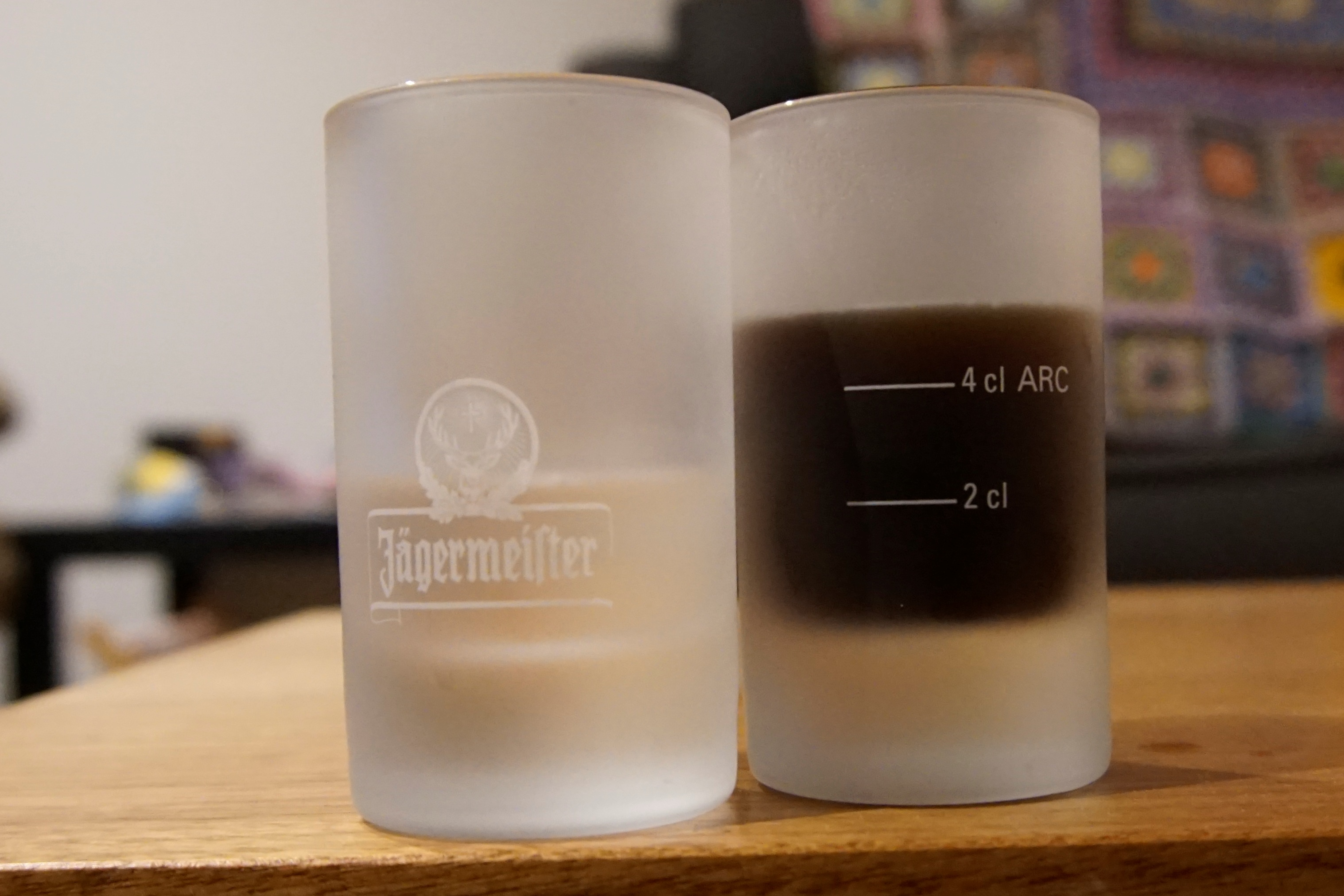
Two Jägermeister shot glasses with fill lines designating 20 and 40 ml measures

A jigger, also known as a measure, is a bartending tool used to measure liquor, which is typically then poured into a glass or cocktail shaker.

The term jigger in the sense of a small cup or measure of spirits or wine originates in the U.S. in the early 19th century. Many references from the 1800s describe the "jigger boss" providing jiggers of whiskey to Irish immigrant workers who were digging canals in the U.S. Northeast.

The style of double-ended jigger common today, made of stainless steel with two unequal-sized opposing cones in an hourglass shape, was patented in 1893 by Cornelius Dungan of Chicago. Typically, one cone measures a regulation single shot, and the other some fraction or multiple—with the actual sizes depending on local laws and customs.

In the U.S. up until Prohibition, a jigger was commonly known to be about half a gill, or 2 US fluid ounces (59 ml), but starting in the latter part of the 20th century, it is typically interpreted to be 1.5 US fluid ounces (44 ml). The jiggers used in the U.K. are typically 25 ml (0.85 US fl oz) and sometimes 35 ml (1.2 US fl oz). Jiggers may also hold other amounts and ratios, and can vary depending on the region and date of manufacture. Many jiggers may also have fractional markings on the inside of the bowl, to facilitate smaller measures of liquid.

== Sizes ==
Country	Small	Single	Double	Notes
Albania		50 ml	100 ml	
Australia		30 ml	60 ml	A single shot is sometimes called a "nip". At 30 ml, a typical spirit with 40 percent alcohol is roughly equivalent to one Australian standard drink.
Bulgaria	50 ml	100 ml	200 ml	
Canada	30 ml (1 US fl oz) or 28 ml (1 imp fl oz)	44 ml (1.5 US fl oz) or 43 ml (1.5 imp fl oz)	71 ml (2.5 imp fl oz)	In Canada, a "shot" may refer to an official "standard drink" of 1.5 imperial fluid ounces or 42.6 millilitres, though all establishments serve a "standard drink" of 1 oz. However, shot glasses available in Canada typically are manufactured according to US fluid ounces rather than imperial, making them about 4% larger.
Channel Islands		25 ml	50 ml	Jersey and Guernsey, both Crown Dependencies.
Denmark	20 ml	40 ml	50 ml	
Estonia	20 or 30 ml	40 ml		
Finland	20 ml	40 ml	—N/a	
France		25 or 35 ml	50 or 70 ml	
Germany		20 ml	40 ml	In Germany, shot glasses (Schnapsglas, Pinnchen, Stamperl) are smaller.
Greece		45 ml	90 ml	A shot is also commonly referred to as a sfinaki and it can be made of one liquor or a cocktail mix. There is also a 3 oz – "bottoms up" – version of sfinaki, called hypovrychio, Greek word for submarine. It is served in a standard liquor glass half full of lager, where the bartender adds a glass shot filled with vodka or whiskey.
Hungary	20 or 30 ml	40 or 50 ml	80 or 100 ml	In Hungarian, shot glasses are called felespohár (feles meaning "half", standing for 0.5 dl), pálinkáspohár (for pálinka), kupica or stampedli.
India	30 ml	60 ml	120 ml	A shot is commonly referred to as a "peg", and is measured as a "small" (chhota), or a "large" (bud-da) peg. A 120 ml shot (approximate quantity) in India is called a Patiala peg.
Ireland		35.5 ml	71 ml	Derived from the use of a quarter-gill (35.516 ml, one-sixteenth of a pint) as the traditional Irish spirit measure.
Isle of Man		28.4 ml	56.8 ml	One-fifth of an imperial gill.
Israel	30 ml	50 or 60 ml		In Israel, the common word for a small shot is צ'ייסר ("chaser").
Italy	30 ml	40 or 60 ml		In Italy, the common word for a shot is cicchetto or, more informally and used mainly in nightclubs by young people, shottino. In North Italy, the cicchetto is the most-common way to taste grappa from at least two centuries.
Japan	30 ml	60 ml		In Japanese, the word ショットグラス (shottogurasu) is the term for a shot glass.
Korea		50 ml		Due to the reason shot glasses are almost exclusively used with Soju, they are called 소주잔 (soju-jan, lit. Soju glass).
Netherlands		35 ml		In the Netherlands a standard shot glass is 35 ml. A shot glass is also called a borrelglas, in which borrel means a gathering at which alcoholic drinks are served and borrelen is a verb meaning to partake in said gathering.
Norway	20 ml	40 ml		
Poland	20 ml	50 ml	100 ml	A standard shot (small) is called pięćdziesiątka (lit. fifty, as in 50 ml) while a large shot (double) is called setka or, colloquially, seta (lit. a hundred, as in 100 ml).
Romania	50 ml	100 ml		A small shot is traditionally known in the Romanian language as unu mic (una mică) meaning "a small one" or cinzeacă, meaning "a fifty", as in fifty milliliters. A single shot is simply called unu (una mare), meaning "one (big)".
Russia		50 ml	100 ml	Both single and double shots are commonly called стопка (stópka) in Russian, though a variety of slang names exist. Before metrication a single shot was called шкалик (shkálik) and amounted to 61.5 ml, while a double was called чарка (chárka) and was equal to 123 ml — both names are still occasionally used.
Serbia	20 ml	30–50 ml	60–100 ml	A single shot is traditionally known in the Serbian language as чашица за ракију and ракијска чашица, meaning "small glass for rakija" and "rakija glass", or simply as мера—мерица, meaning "measure". A double shot is simply called Дупли, meaning "a double", while the smallest, 20 milliliter glass, is known as dvojka meaning "two".
Sweden	20 ml	40 ml	60 ml	A single shot is referred to as a fyra, meaning "a four" and a double is referred to as a sexa, meaning "a six", as Swedes generally use centiliters rather than milliliters.
Slovakia	20 or 25 ml	40 or 50 ml	80 or 100 ml	The most-common single-shot size is the pol deci (literally, "half a decilitre", 50 ml).
Slovenia	30 ml	50 ml	100 ml	The 50 ml size is colloquially known as nula pet ("zero five", meaning 0.5 of a decilitre), and the small one nula tri ("zero three"). Another common term for a single shot is ta kratek, meaning "the short one".
South Africa		25 ml	50 ml	The South African government has an official definition for the single-shot size.
United Kingdom		25 or 35 ml	50 or 70 ml	Shots sold on-premises must contain either 25 ml or 35 ml measures of whisky, gin, rum, or vodka as defined in the Weights and Measures Act of 1985. This requirement does not extend to other spirits. A 2001 amendment allowed a double shot of 70 ml to be served. Generally, a single shot is equal to 35 ml in Northern Ireland and Scotland and 25 ml in Wales and England.
United States		30 to 44 ml (1.0 to 1.5 US fl oz)	44 to 89 ml (1.5 to 3 US fl oz)	There is no official size for a single shot, except in Utah, where a shot is defined as 1.5 US fl oz (44.4 ml). Elsewhere in the U.S., the standard size is generally considered to be 1.25–1.5 US fl oz (37–44 ml). A double shot in the U.S. may be 2 US fl oz (59.1 ml) or more. However in most of the U.S. 1.5 US fl oz is the standard, with 1.5 US fl oz of 40% A.B.V spirit having the equivalent alcohol of 12 US fl oz (354.9 ml) of 5% beer, and 5 US fl oz (147.9 ml) of 12% wine.

== See also ==
- Alcoholic spirits measure
- Alcohol measurements
