= Queen Mary (cocktail) =

Blend of beer, grenadine & maraschino cherries

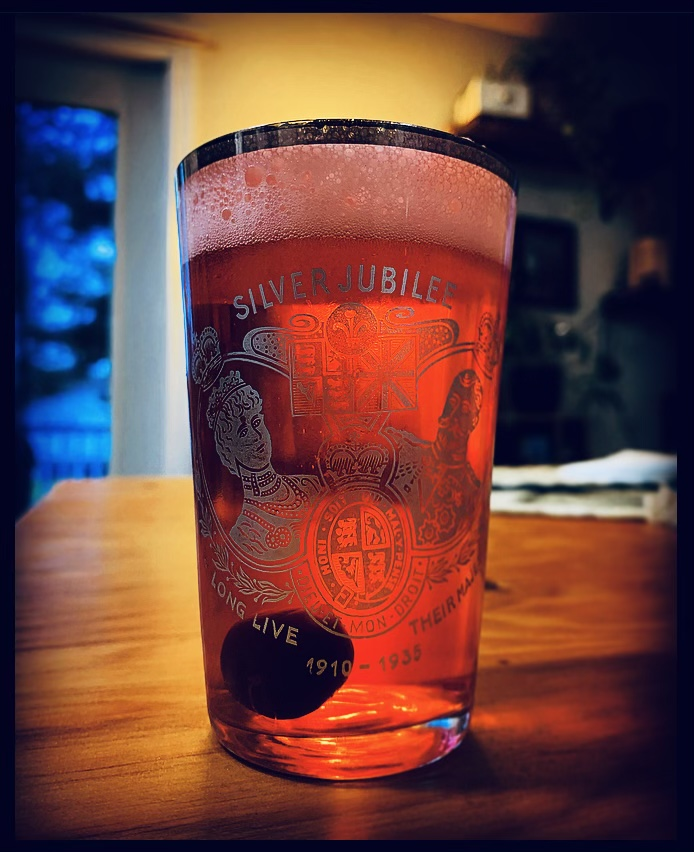
- Beer, grenadine and maraschino cherries
- Type: Mixed drink
- Origin: Canada
- Ingredients: Glass of beer; Grenadine (to taste); Syrup from Maraschino cherries (optional)
- Standard drinkware: Beer glassware
- Standard garnish: Maraschino cherries
- Served: Neat; chilled
- Preparation: Pour grenadine, then beer; leave room for pink beer head; garnish with maraschino cherries; drizzle syrup from cherries for added sweetness and colour

A Queen Mary beer cocktail is a mixture of grenadine and beer, which is commonly garnished with maraschino cherries. It is typically served in beer glassware, leaving room for a generous amount of beer head which can take on a pink or cherry-like tone. This drink can be quite sweet and is best enjoyed chilled.

== History ==
The Queen Mary was conceived by members of the University of Calgary Dinos men’s swimming team in Calgary, Canada, in the early 2000s. The drink has since become popular in North America, Europe, and Australia as an alternative to a shandy. The drink is reportedly named after Mary of Teck, Queen Consort to King George V of the United Kingdom and the British Dominions.

== Preparation and serving ==
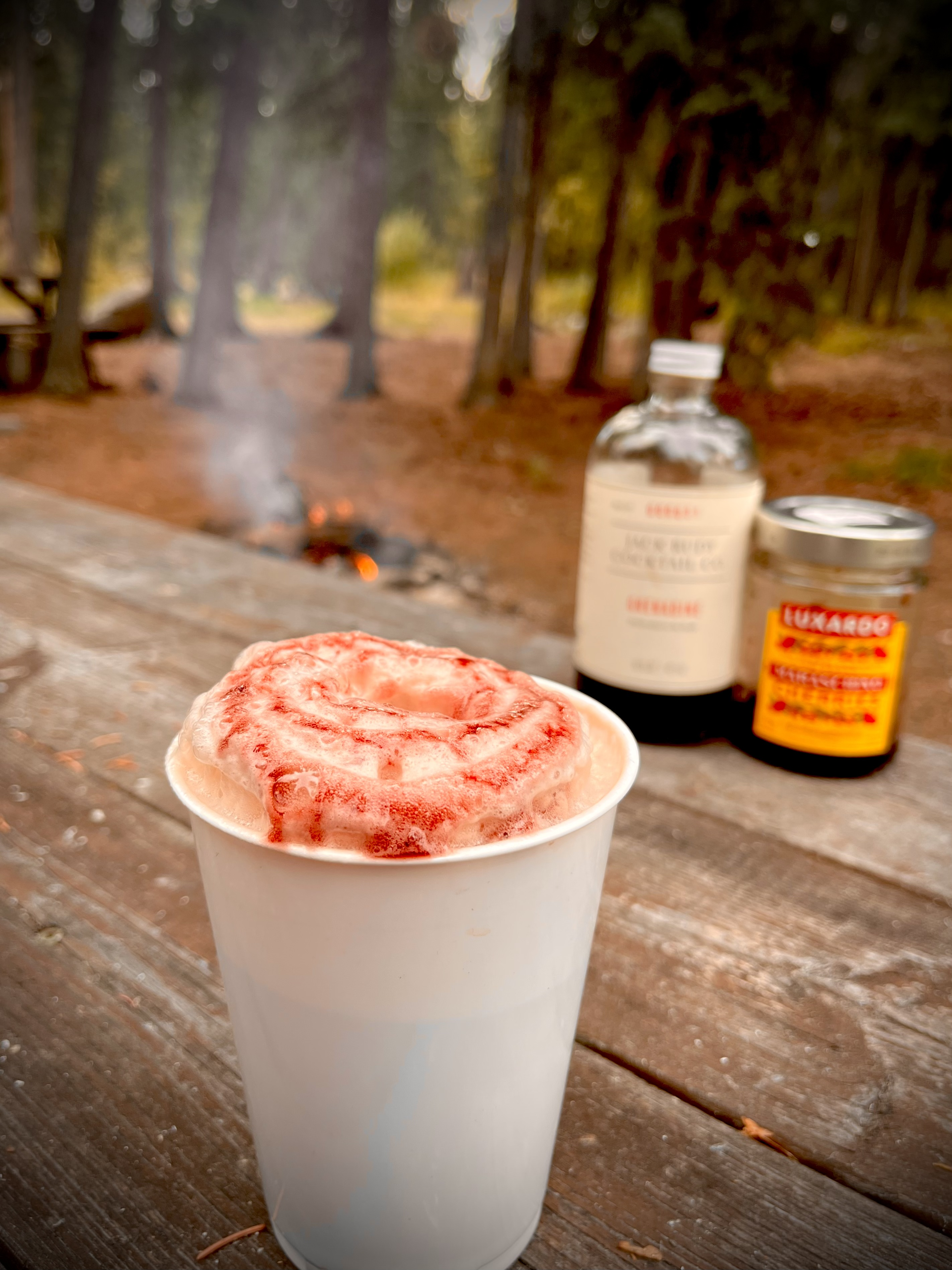
A Queen Mary cocktail, with syrup from the cherries drizzled on top

A Queen Mary cocktail is made by pouring grenadine into a beer glass, to taste, followed by beer, leaving room at the top for a thick layer of pink-hued beer foam. Maraschino cherries are often added as a garnish, while drizzling syrup from the cherries onto the beer foam for additional sweetness and colour, as desired.

While any beer can be used to make a Queen Mary, lighter beer styles are generally preferred, such as a lager, pilsner or pale ale. Variants of the drink can also be made by using non-alcoholic beer, or by including additional ingredients such as lemonade.

== See also ==
- Bloody Mary (cocktail)
- Roy Rogers (drink)
- Shirley Temple (drink)
- Arnold Palmer (drink)
