= Jägermeister =

German digestif

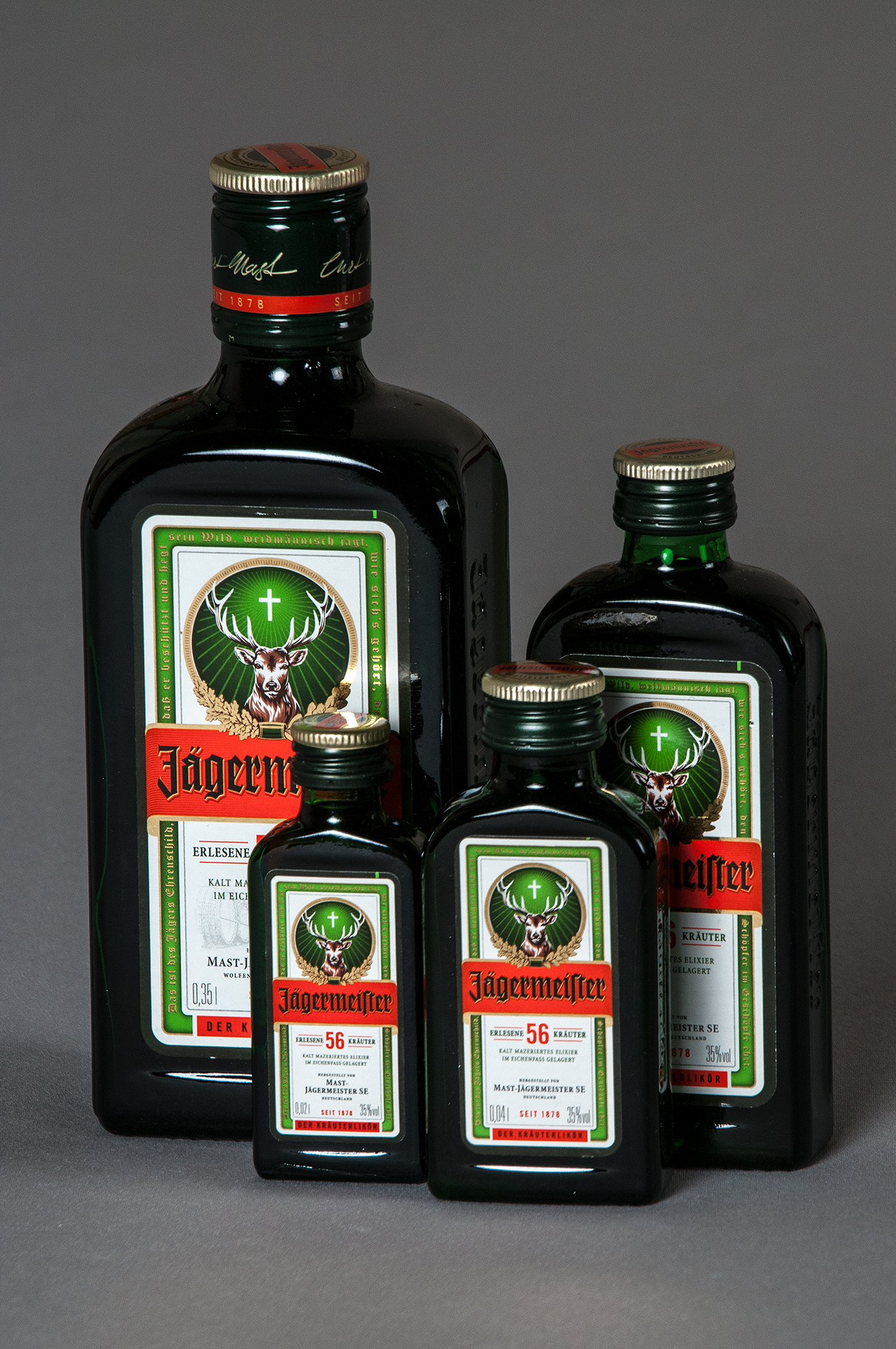
- Type: Digestif
- Manufacturer: Mast-Jägermeister SE
- Origin: Germany
- Alcohol by volume: 35%
- Proof (US): 61 (UK) 70 (US)
- Colour: Dark brown
- Website: www.jagermeister.com

Jägermeister (/ˈjeɪɡərmaɪstər/ YAY-gər-my-stər, German: [ˈjɛːɡɐˌmaɪstɐ]) is a German spiced digestif liqueur. Developed in 1934 by Wilhelm and Curt Mast, it has an alcohol by volume of 35% (61 degrees proof, or US 70 proof). The recipe of 56 herbs and spices has not changed since its creation, and the drink continues to be sold in a green glass bottle. It is the flagship product of Mast-Jägermeister SE, headquartered in Wolfenbüttel, Germany.

== History ==
Wilhelm Mast began as a vinegar manufacturer and wine trader in Wolfenbüttel, Germany. His son, Curt Mast (1897–1970), was passionate about producing spirits and liqueurs and was keen to help his father in the business from an early age. In 1934, at age 37, Curt devised the recipe for Jägermeister after he took over his father's business.

Curt was an enthusiastic hunter. The word Jägermeister in German means "master hunter", "hunt master", or "master of the hunt". It is a title for a high-ranking official in charge of matters related to hunting and gamekeeping, and has been used for many centuries. In 1934, the new Reichsjagdgesetz (Reich hunting law) redefined the term to apply to senior foresters, game wardens, and gamekeepers in the German civil service. Hermann Göring was appointed Reichsjägermeister (Reich hunting master) when the new hunting law was introduced. Thus, when Jägermeister was introduced in 1935, its name was already familiar to Germans, who sometimes called the product "Göring-Schnaps".

Jägermeister came to greater international attention particularly through the work of Sidney Frank (1919–2006), who ran an American liquor importing company. From the 1980s, he promoted the drink in the youth and student market as a drink for parties—a quite different niche to its traditional conservative brand position in its native German market. New York magazine quoted a market research firm describing him as "a promotional genius" for making "a liqueur with an unpronounceable name... drunk by older, blue-collar Germans as an after-dinner digestive aid... synonymous with 'party'". The Mast-Jägermeister company ultimately purchased Sidney Frank Importing in 2015.

== Composition ==
Jägermeister is a type of liqueur called Kräuterlikör (herbal liqueur). It is akin to other European liqueurs, such as Gammel Dansk from Denmark, Ratafia from Catalonia, Făt-Frumos balsam and Nucul de Aur from Moldova, Beerenburg from the Netherlands, Unicum from Hungary, Becherovka from the Czech Republic, Gorzka Żołądkowa from Poland, Demänovka from Slovakia, Pelinkovac from Croatia, Riga Black Balsam from Latvia, Gorki List from Serbia, Fernet-Branca from Italy, Licor Beirão from Portugal, and Chartreuse and Bénédictine from France. Unlike those beverages, Jägermeister has a sweeter taste. In Germany itself, there are quite a few competitors, such as Killepitsch, Kuemmerling, Schierker Feuerstein, Schwartzhog, Wurzelpeter, and Underberg, some of which are as sweet as Jägermeister.

Jägermeister's ingredients consist of 56 herbs, fruits, roots, and spices, including citrus peel, licorice, anise, saffron, and ginger. These ingredients are ground, then steeped in water and alcohol for two to three days. This mixture is filtered and stored in oak barrels for about a year. The liqueur is then filtered again and mixed with sugar, caramel and alcohol.

The company recommends that Jägermeister be kept on ice and served cold, and suggests that it be kept in a freezer at −18 °C (0 °F) or on tap between −15 and −11 °C (5 and 12 °F).

Contrary to a rumor that has circulated online, Jägermeister does not contain deer or elk blood.

== Label ==
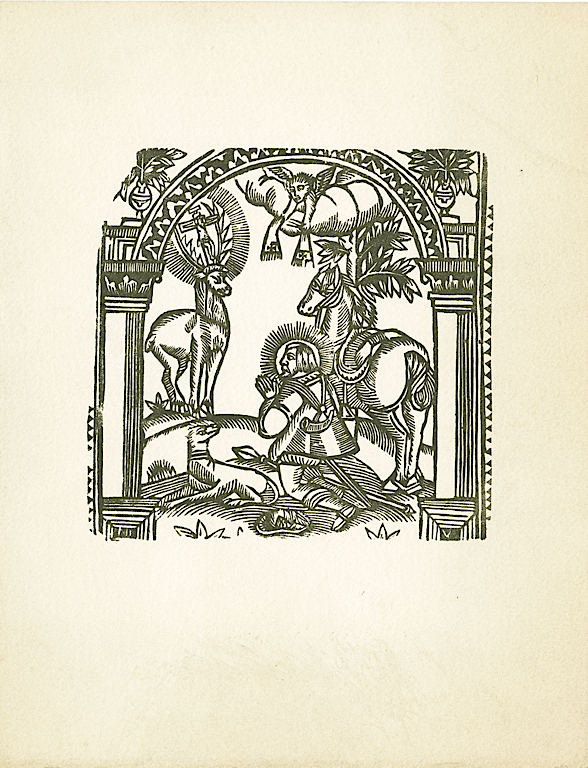
Anon. (France), Untitled (St. Eustace), 19th century, woodcut, National Gallery of Art Library, Washington, DC

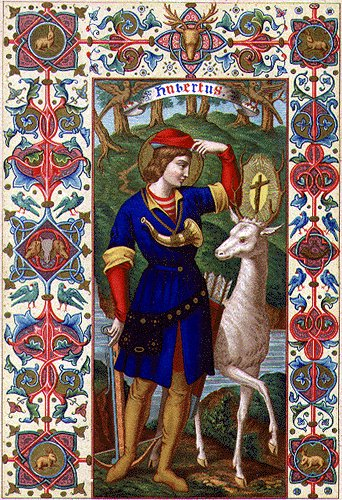
An icon of Saint Hubert of Liège depicting his vision of a cross between the antlers of a stag

The label on Jägermeister bottles features a glowing Christian cross seen between the antlers of a stag. This image is a reference to the two patron saints of hunters, Hubert of Liège and Eustace, both of whom converted to Christianity after experiencing a vision in which they saw a cross between a stag's antlers.

The label also contains the following verse from the poem Weidmannsheil, by the forester, hunter, and ornithologist Oskar von Riesenthal (although von Riesenthal is not credited on the label).

Das ist des Jägers Ehrenschild,
dass er beschützt und hegt sein Wild,
weidmännisch jagt, wie sich's gehört,
den Schöpfer im Geschöpfe ehrt.

This translates to:

It is the hunter's badge of honour
That he protects and tends to his game,
Hunting in a sportsmanlike manner, as is proper,
Honouring the Creator in the creation.

== Cocktails ==
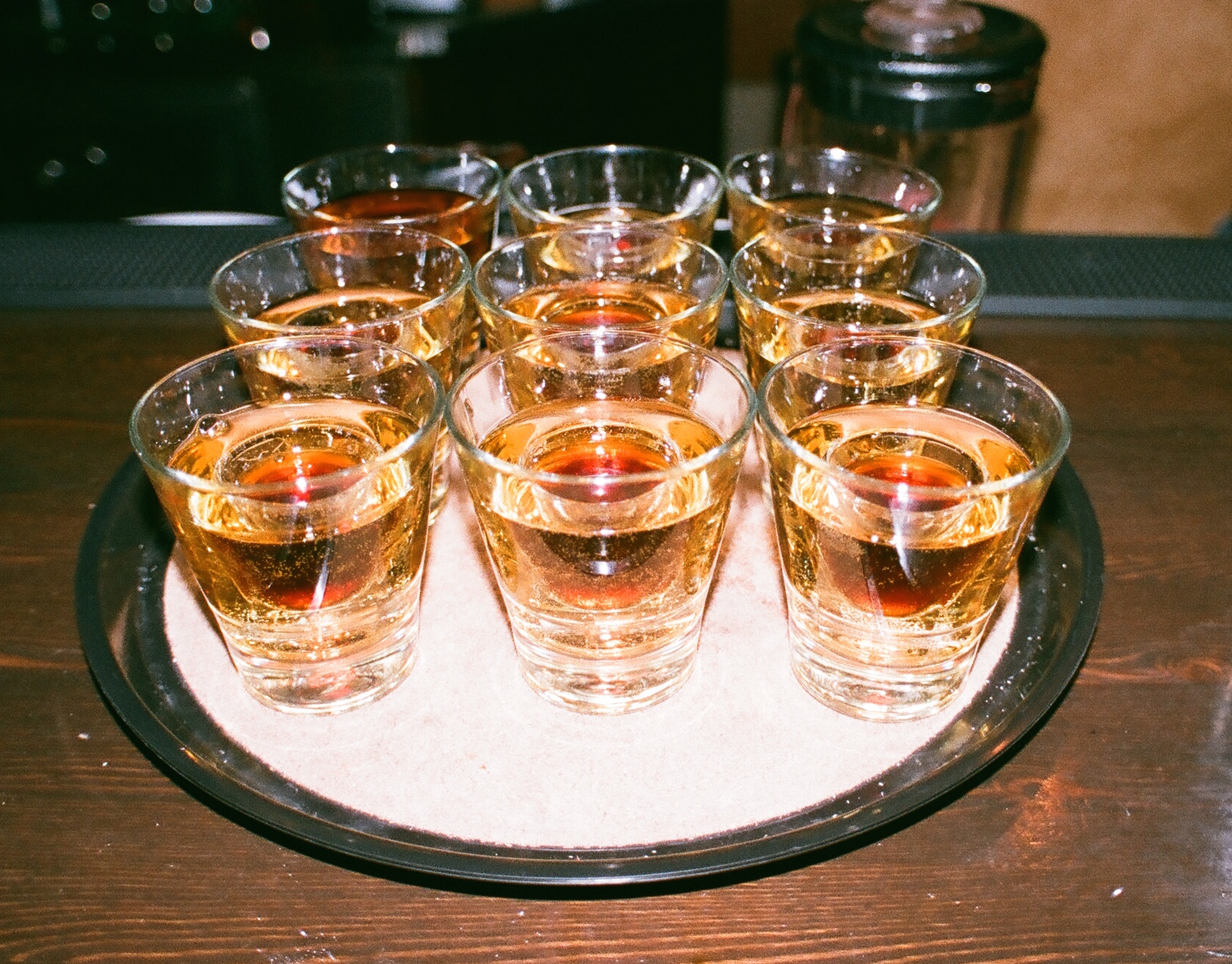
Jägerbomb cocktails in an Athens bar

The sweet, herbal profile of Jägermeister has allowed for widespread use in cocktails, including:

- A shot glass of Jägermeister dropped into a glass of Red Bull energy drink makes a cocktail called a Jägerbomb.
- A Surfer on Acid is made with equal parts of Jägermeister, Malibu, and pineapple juice.
- The Four Horsemen of the Apocalypse is a shot made with equal parts Jägermeister, Rumple Minze, Goldschläger, and Bacardi 151.
- Starry Night shot consists of 2/3 shot of Jägermeister and 1/3 shot of Goldschläger.
- The Redheaded slut, also known as a ginger bitch, is a cocktail made of Jägermeister, peach-flavored Schnapps, and cranberry juice.

== Line extensions ==
=== Ready to drink ===
In 2012, Jägermeister launched premixed drinks as a brand extension. The drinks come in two flavours, "raw" and "ginger lime".

=== Spice ===
From 2013 to 2016, Jägermeister launched a seasonal line extension called Winterkräuter in German and Spice in English; it included cinnamon and vanilla flavours. In 2025 Winterkräuter was re-released in Germany and Poland under the name "Winter Edition".

=== Manifest ===
In 2018, Jägermeister launched a premium line extension titled Manifest. The 38% ABV spirit is twice oak-aged and not to be served ice cold.

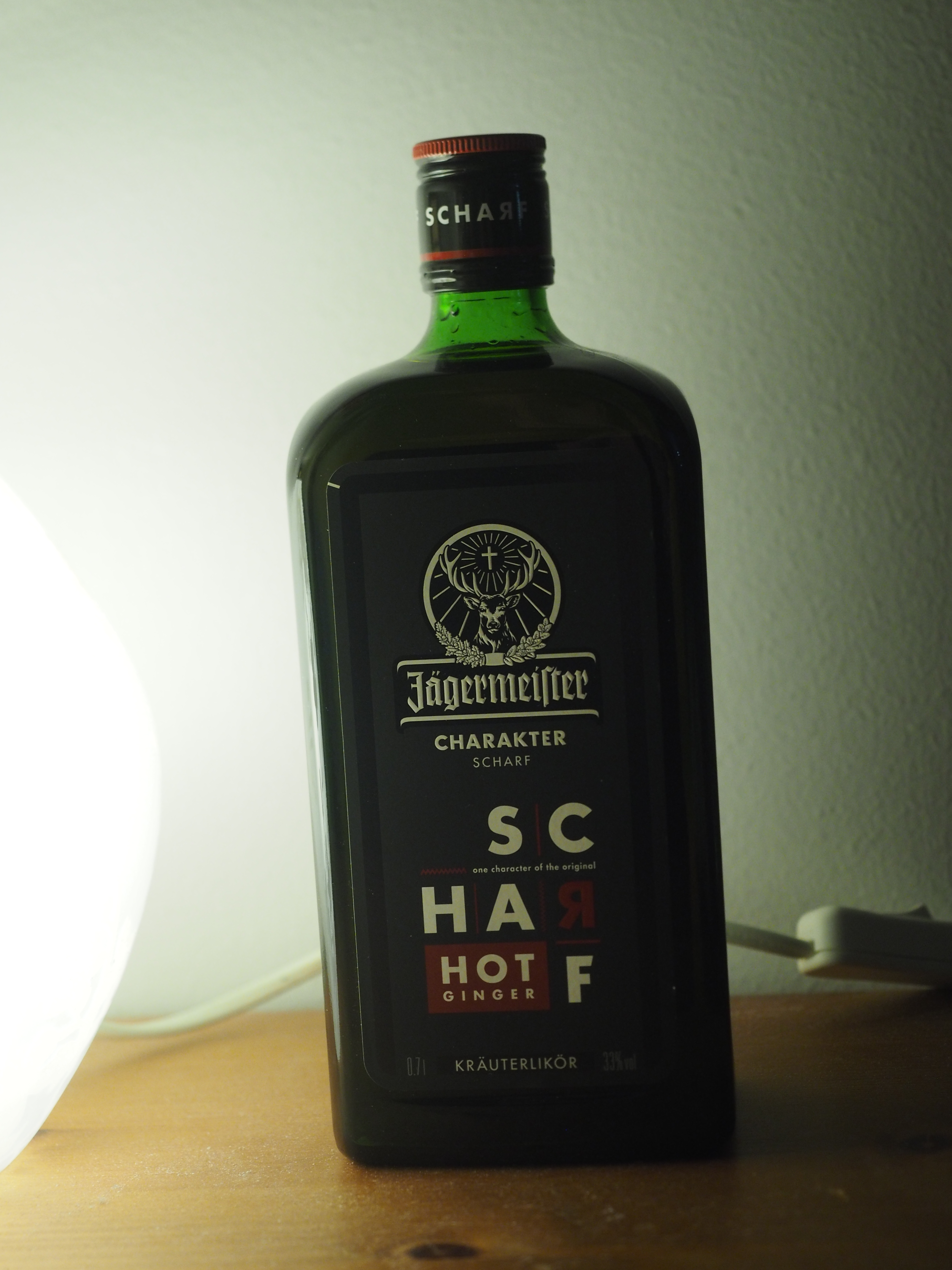
A bottle of Jägermeister Scharf

=== Karakter series ===
In 2019, Jägermeister launched the first of its karakter series, Scharf, also known as Jägermeister Hot Ginger. Each extension in the karakter series was intended to highlight one of Jägermeister's 56 signature herbs and spices. As of January 2021, no further extensions under the karakter series have been announced.

=== Jägermeister Cold Brew Coffee ===
In 2019, Jägermeister launched Jägermeister Cold Brew Coffee Liqueur, using its original recipe with fair trade coffee and cacao added.

=== Jägermeister ArtsyApes edition ===
In 2023, Jägermeister Austria launched a special edition called ArtsyApes. The edition shows hand-painted apes on canvas. There are 3,777 different designs.

=== Jägermeister Orange ===
In 2025, Jägermeister launched Jägermeister Orange in central Europe.

== Marketing ==
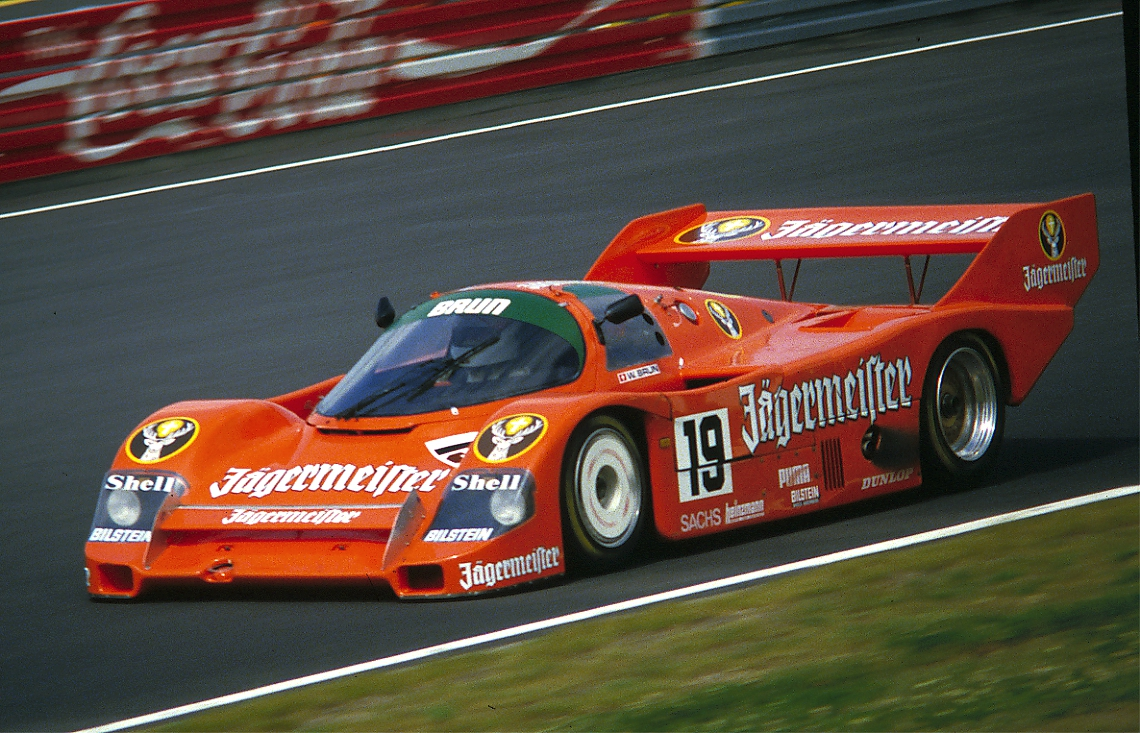
A Brun Motorsport Porsche 956, sponsored by Jägermeister

=== Sports ===
From the 1970s, the Jägermeister brand has developed an association with motor racing, as they have sponsored various European racing teams, primarily those who fielded BMWs and Porsches. These teams have competed in various major racing series including Formula One (March and EuroBrun), DRM (Max Moritz, Kremer, Zakspeed), DTM and Group C (Brun Motorsport), who took the team title in the 1986 World Sportscar Championship.

Jägermeister's orange livery is one of the more commonly recognised in motorsport. The Spanish Fly slot car brand has recently brought out model cars with the distinctive design. More recently, they introduced the Naylor Racing NHRA Pro Stock car, minus the orange livery. An article in the January 31, 2008, edition of Autosport listed the livery as one of the twenty most iconic commercial colour schemes.

Jägermeister is associated with German football, especially the Bundesliga. In 1973, Eintracht Braunschweig became the first Bundesliga team to place a sponsor's logo on its jersey, although the team rejected a related proposal to rename itself Eintracht Jägermeister. The sponsorship, very controversial at the time, paid the team 100,000 DM (€51,130) and introduced a new way of doing business in football. Other teams quickly followed suit. Jägermeister now displays its advertisements at several football stadiums in Germany.

Jägermeister also had an involvement in European table tennis when it sponsored German club TTC Jägermeister Calw and was a personal sponsor of Dragutin Šurbek.

As of 2018, Jägermeister has sponsored the National Hockey League (NHL) as the official shot of the NHL.

In 2024, the USL announced a new competition open to teams in USL League One called the USL Cup, which is now also open to USL Championship teams. It has been known as the Jägermeister Cup due to sponsorship reasons since its foundation.

=== Music ===
In the United States, Jägermeister became popular through promotion by Sidney Frank and through its association with heavy metal and rock music bands, such as Murphy's Law, Halestorm, Metallica, Mötley Crüe, Pantera, Slayer, HIM, Crossfaith, Epica, The Bloodhound Gang, Psychostick, Big John Bates and Turbonegro. Jägermeister was the tour sponsor of numerous bands of this genre.

Jägermeister has been a sponsor of the second stage at the Rockstar Mayhem Festival since 2008. Mayhem Fest is a large hard rock and modern metal festival that tours the United States and Canada. In 2008, the stage featured the bands Machine Head, Airbourne, Five Finger Death Punch and Walls of Jericho. The 2009 Mayhem Fest Jäger Stage featured Trivium, All That Remains and God Forbid. The 2010 stage featured the bands Hatebreed, Chimaira, Shadows Fall and Winds of Plague. The 2011 stage featured Unearth, Kingdom of Sorrow, and Red Fang. The 2012 stage featured Anthrax, Asking Alexandria, and more.

The Jägermeister Music Tour, which was owned by Sidney Frank Importing, was an event that was held each year in the spring and fall.

In Australia, Jägermeister sponsors the AIR Charts, which are Australia's official independent music charts (run by the Australian Independent Record Labels Association).

In 2020 Jägermeister USA launched a program titled "Meister Class", an initiative to provide emerging musicians with insight from and access to artists Mustard, Smino, and EarthGang.

On December 18, 2020, it was announced that Jägermeister USA donated one million dollars to NIVA Emergency Relief Fund in support of venues struggling due to COVID-19 restrictions.

== Gallery ==
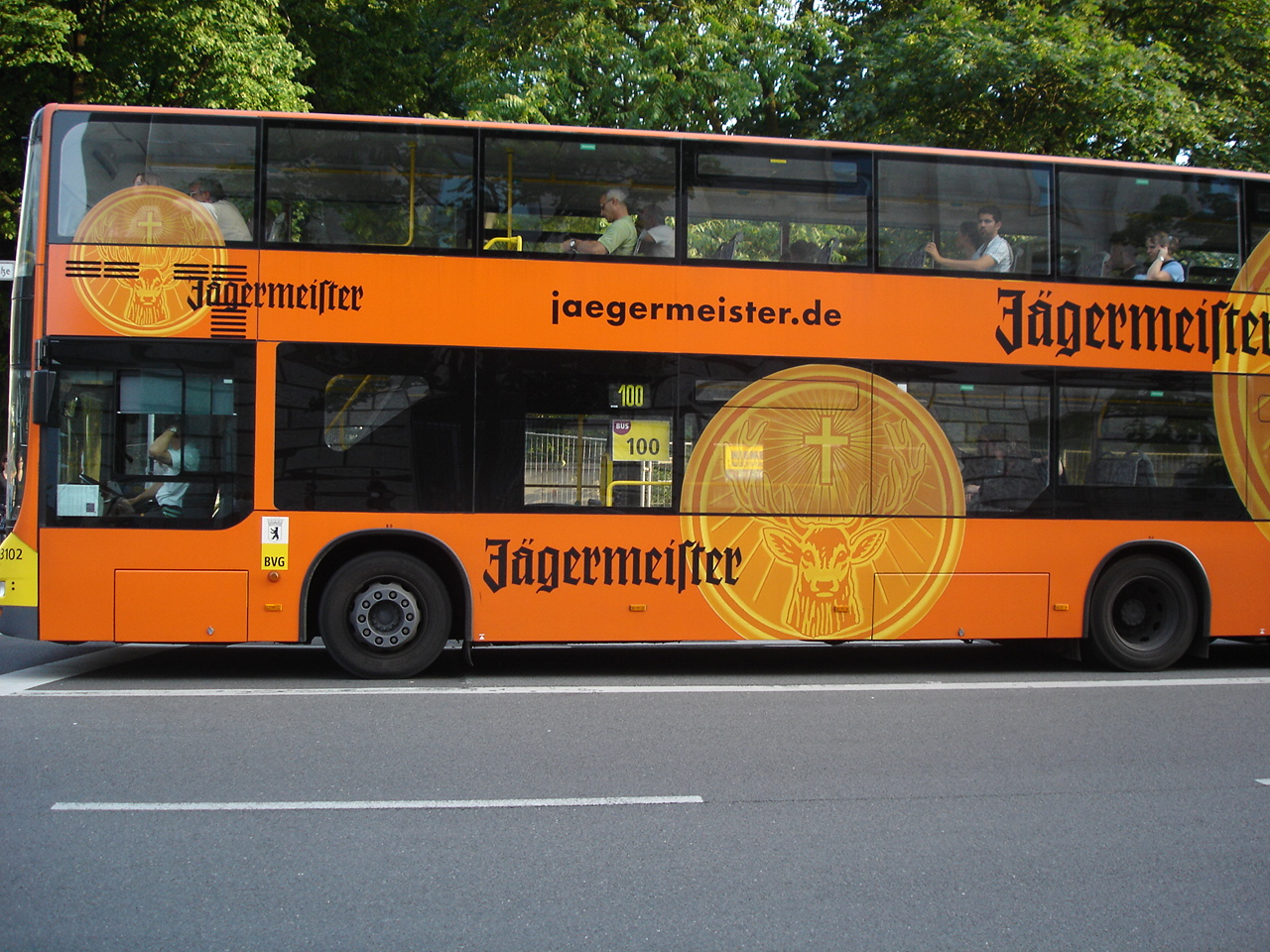
A bus advertising Jägermeister in Berlin, 2007

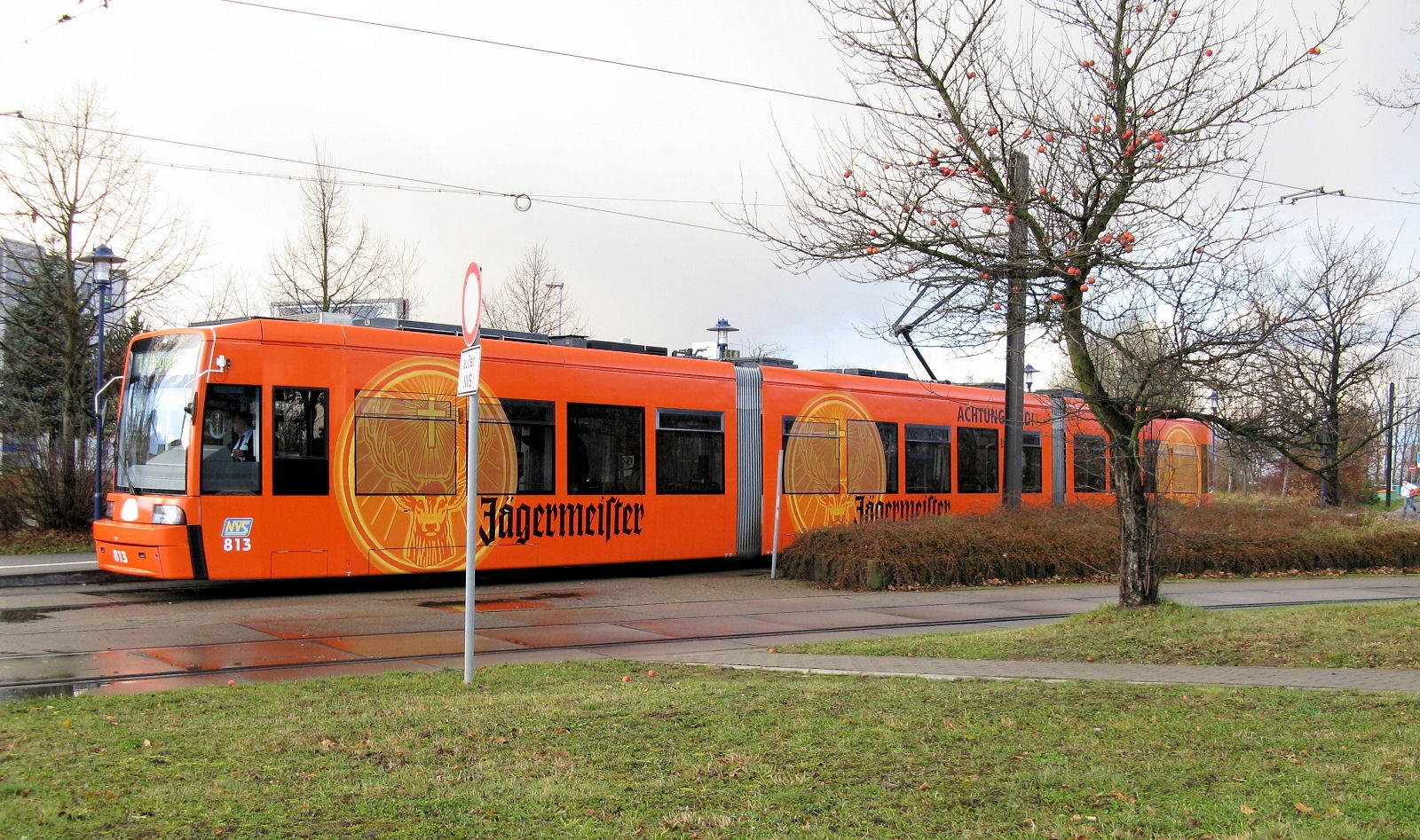
A tram advertising Jägermeister in Schwerin, 2007

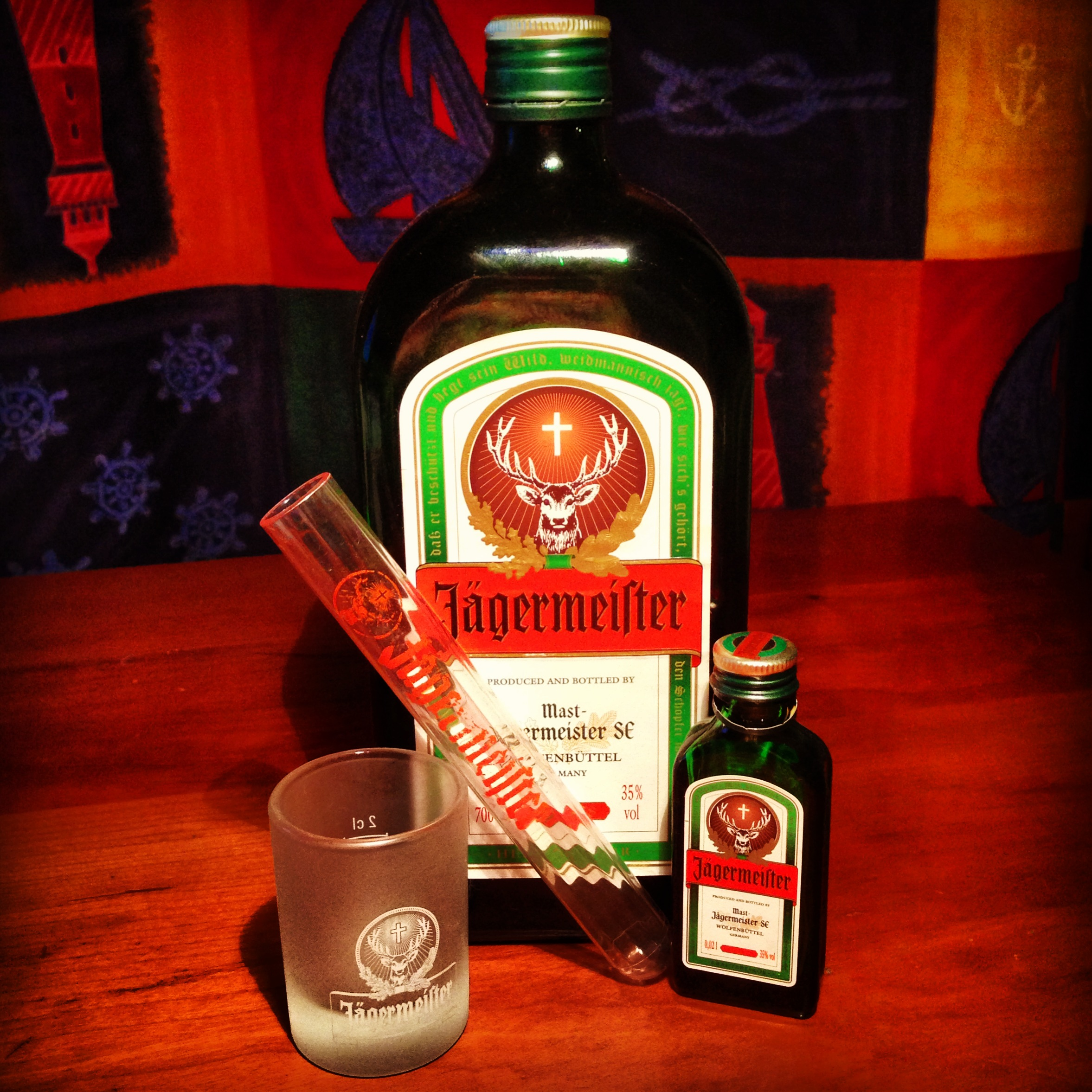
Jägermeister 700 ml bottle alongside a 20 ml bottle, a Jägermeister branded shot glass, and a Jägermeister branded test tube

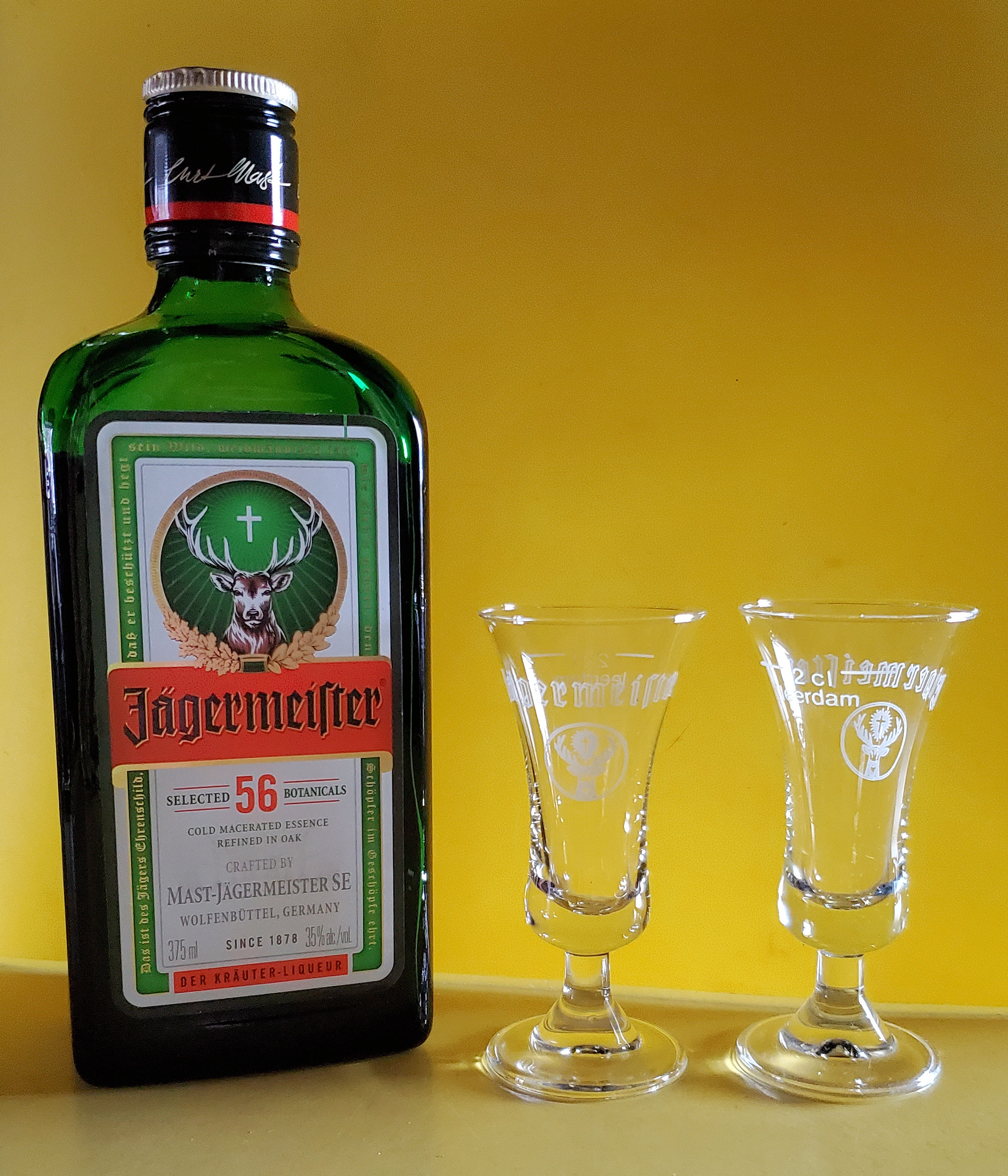
Jägermeister 375 ml bottle with Jägermeister branded cordial shot glasses

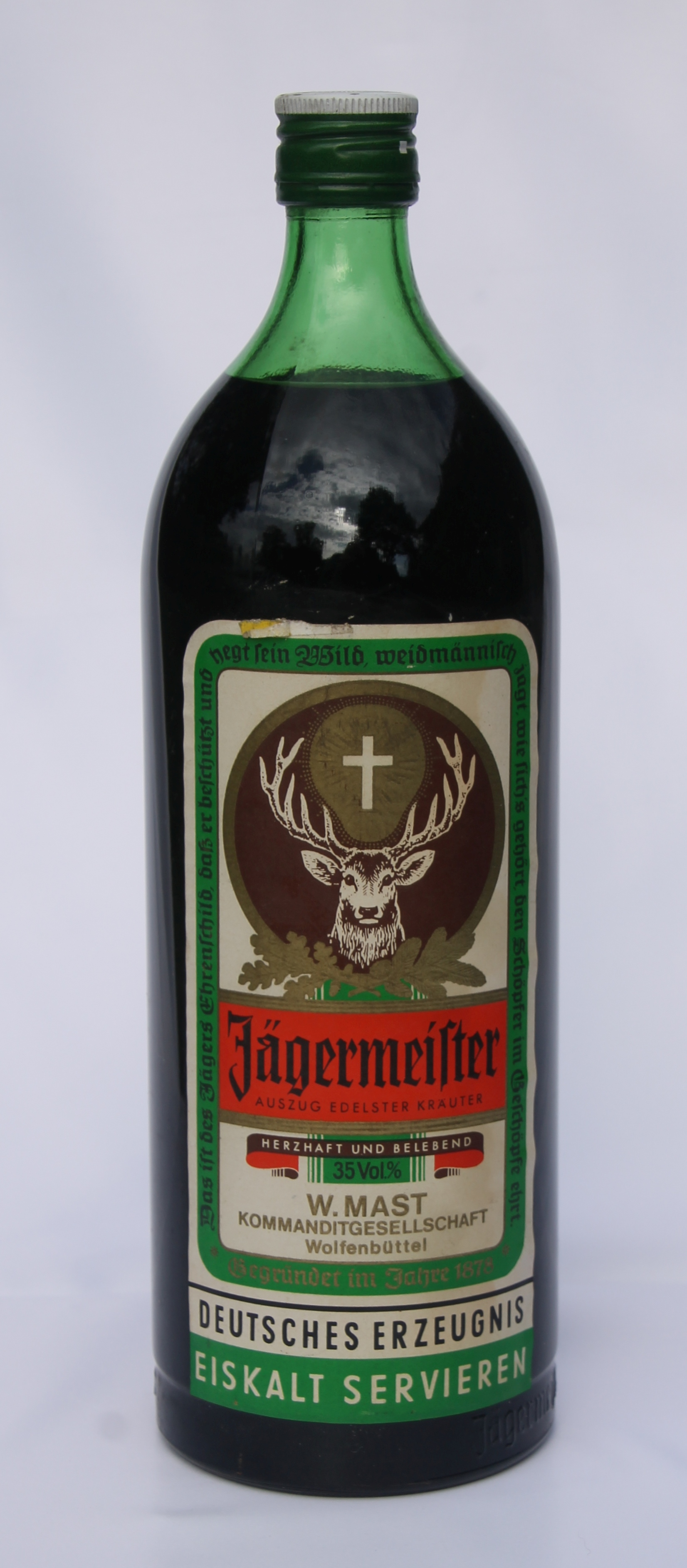
A round 1 litre bottle of Jägermeister that was sold to catering establishments from 1954 to 1996

== See also ==
- Fernet Branca
