= Redheaded slut =

Cocktail

- Type: Mixed drink
- Ingredients: 5 cl (one part) Jägermeister; 5 cl (one part) peach schnapps; cranberry juice
- Base spirit: Schnapps, Jägermeister
- Standard drinkware: Rocks glass (double)
- Served: On the rocks: poured over ice
- Preparation: Combine Jägermeister and schnapps in glass full of ice. Add cranberry juice to fill to top. Stir as necessary.

The redheaded slut is a cocktail made of Jägermeister, peach-flavored schnapps, and cranberry juice.

== Preparation and variations ==
A redheaded slut is typically made as either a mixed drink or a shooter. As a mixed drink the ingredients are generally poured over ice in a small cocktail glass, then stirred. As a shooter, the ingredients are mixed with ice in a cocktail shaker then strained and poured into a shot glass.

A very common variation includes equal parts Jägermeister, Schnapps, Crown Royal and cranberry-flavored vodka.

A relatively uncommon variation substitutes Chambord for the cranberry juice, and sometimes substitutes Canadian whisky and Southern Comfort for the schnapps and Jägermeister.

A blonde headed slut is a variation of the shaken cocktail that combines equal parts Grand Marnier and peach schnapps with a splash of pineapple juice.

Another variation, referred to as the Lindsay Lohan, includes a splash of Coke.

On Prince Edward Island, a redheaded slut is a mix of Vodka, Sour Puss, and Raspberry Cordial, a carbonated raspberry soda named for the drink from Anne of Green Gables.

== See also ==
- List of cocktails
