= Franz Wilhelm Langguth Erben =

German Winery

F. W. Langguth Erben
- Location: Traben-Trarbach, Germany
- Other labels: Berliner Bärensiegel
- Founded: 1789 (Defunct, as per August 31, 2024)
- Key people: Franz Wilhelm Langguth
- Parent company: Les Grands Chais de France (GCF Group)
- Other products: beer, spirits
- Distribution: international
- Website: langguth.de

F. W. Langguth Erben

Franz Wilhelm Langguth Erben GmbH & Co. KG was a German winery headquartered in Traben-Trarbach. With annual production of about 50 million bottles and sales of about €108 million, Langguth was among the largest wine producers in the country.

The company was founded in 1789 by Franz Wilhelm Langguth. Today it is best known internationally for its Blue Nun brand, and domestically for its Erben and Medinet brands. It also produces the herbal liqueur Wurzelpeter under its Berliner Bärensiegel brand.

The winery was acquired by Les Grands Chais de France (GCF) in the spring of 2024, a French conglomerate that focuses on wine and spirit sales. Subsequently, in the span of less than 2 months after the takeover, the GCF group announced the closure of the Traben-Trarbach site for what they claimed to be a "lack of profitability," ending the more than 2 centuries old winemaking history of Langguth in the region Traben-Trarbach by August 31, 2024.
