= Rumple Minze =

Brand of schnapps

Rumple Minze (/ˈrəm.pl̩.mɪnts/, RUM-pull-mints) is a German-style liqueur brand, best known for peppermint schnapps. The brand is owned by the holding company Diageo, based in London.

The Rumple Minze peppermint liquor has a strong peppermint smell and taste, and it has a high alcohol content at 50% alcohol by volume, (100 proof), which is significantly higher compared to the 40% (or 80 proof) of most liquors . It is commonly served chilled, straight up (in some cases as a digestif) or it can also be mixed to form various cocktails.

The United States is the top market for this product. The success of their peppermint schnapps has led Rumple Minze to release two new flavors which include a berry-flavored liqueur and a lime-flavored liqueur. The two new flavors are also 100 proof.

Although Rumple Minze gives the impression of being a drink produced in Germany or popular in Germany, it is largely unknown in Germany. Mint liqueurs are indeed produced and consumed in Germany. However, local brands such as Berliner Luft and Nordbrand Nordhausen are largely unknown outside of Germany. The name is an artificial portmanteau word consisting of "rumple", which is reminiscent of the German word "Rumpeln" (to make a dull, rumbling sound), and "Minze", the German spelling of mint.

The logo on the front of the bottle is of a double-headed golden eagle, reminiscent of the German national coat of arms (although the coat of arms eagle is single-headed).
