= Schierker Feuerstein =

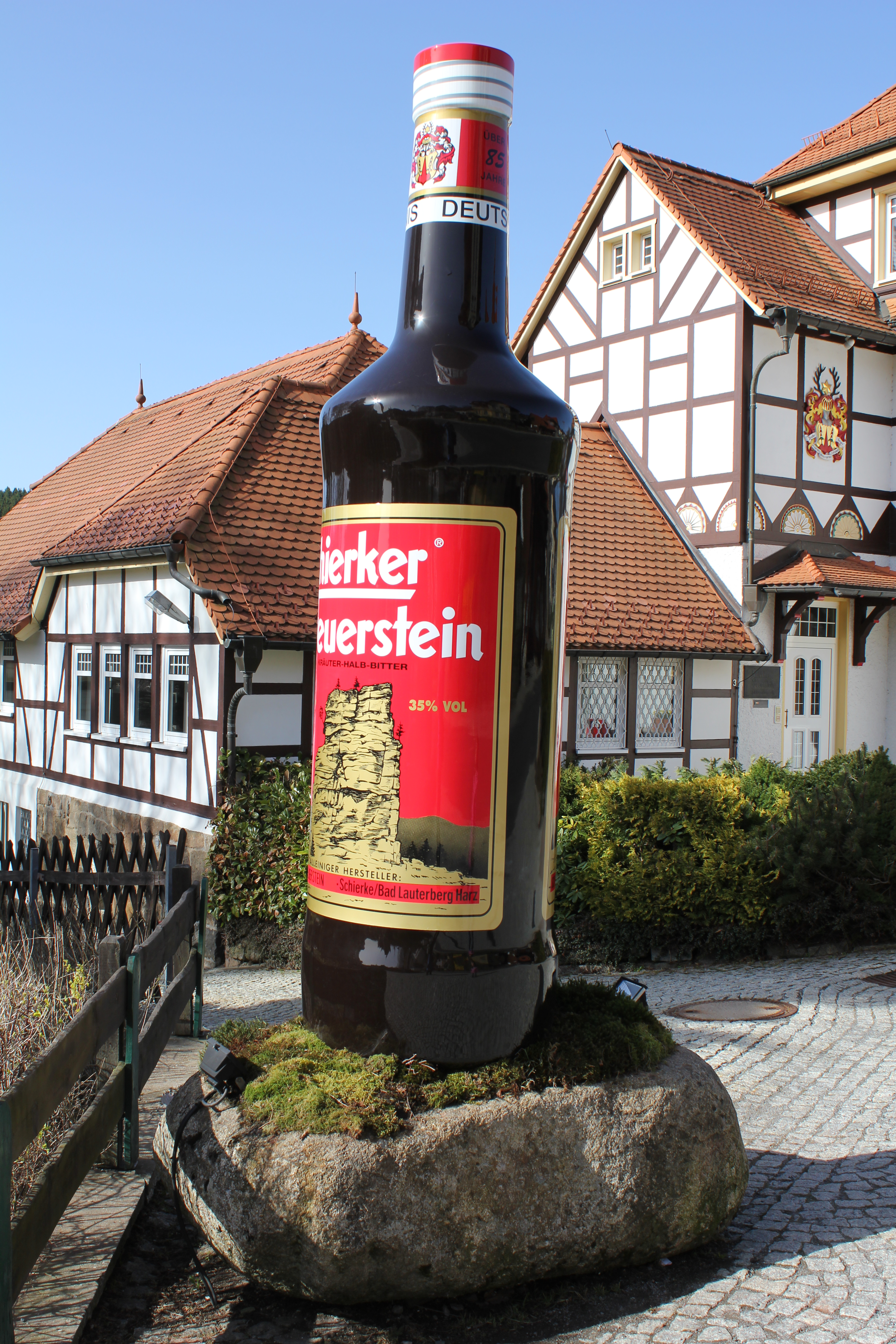
- Large mockup of a bottle of Schierker Feuerstein
- Type: Herbal liqueur
- Manufacturer: Schierker Feuerstein GmbH & Co. KG
- Origin: Schierke, Saxony-Anhalt, Germany
- Introduced: 1924
- Alcohol by volume: 35%
- Proof (US): 61 (UK) 70 (US)
- Colour: Red-brown
- Website: www.schierker-feuerstein.de

Schierker Feuerstein is a German herbal liqueur, a half-bitters at a strength of 35% alcohol by volume (61 degrees proof, or US 70 proof), originally produced in the village of Schierke, located in the Upper Harz region of Saxony-Anhalt, Germany. Due to its red-brown coloration, the liqueur is named after the so-called Feuersteinklippe, a rock formation near the village made of reddish granite.

== History ==
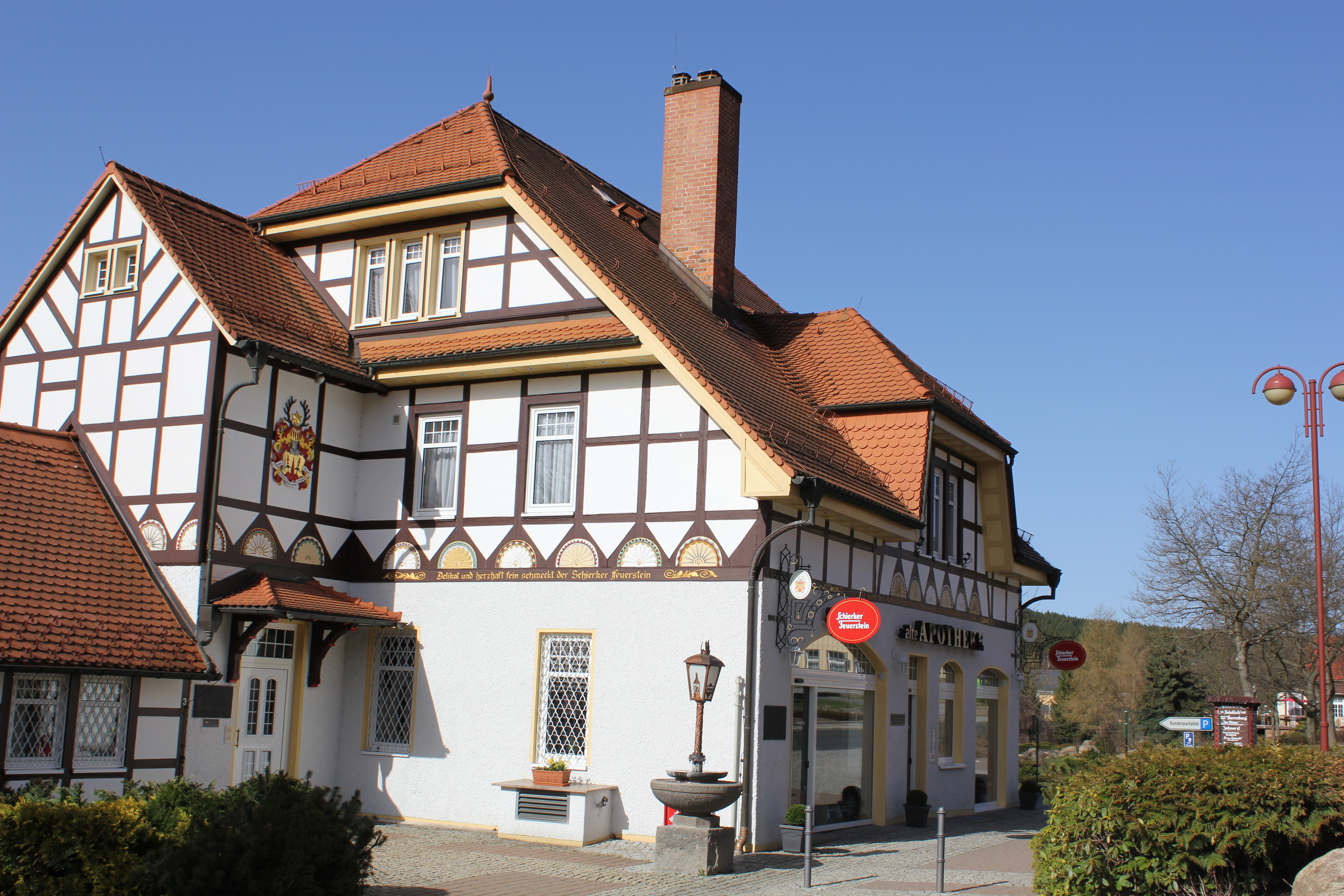
Schierke pharmacy

The recipe was developed by the pharmacist Willy Drube (1880–1952), since 1908 proprietor of the chemist's Zum Roten Fingerhut in Schierke, and which was patented in 1924. Initially administered to Harz tourists, the liqueur soon became a big seller until production was discontinued during World War II. By the end of the war, Schierke belonged to the Soviet occupation zone.

After the death of Willy Drube in 1952 and the migration of his descendants to West Germany, production was continued at Bad Lauterberg in the Lower Saxon part of the Harz mountain range. From 1972 onwards, Schierker Feuerstein was also produced again at the original place in Schierke, East Germany by a Volkseigener Betrieb ("Publicly Owned Operation", VEB), part of a larger beverages combine (Getränkekombinat) based in Magdeburg.

Upon German reunification in 1990, the Schierke and Bad Lauterberg locations merged within the common Schierker Feuerstein GmbH & Co. KG, which continued to produce the liqueur in both facilities.

== Composition ==
Made according to the tightly guarded original recipe, Schierker Feuerstein is related to the following bitter drinks which are all based on the bitter herb, Artemisia: Underberg and Jägermeister (Germany), Piołunówka (Poland), Fernet-Branca (Italy) and Gammel Dansk (Denmark). Artemisia is called wormwood in England. It kills most bacteria and worms in the gut.

The company recommends that Schierker Feuerstein be kept on ice and served cold. It can also be an ingredient of different cocktails and long drinks.
