= Schnapps =

Several types of flavored distilled alcoholic beverages

- Type: Liqueur
- Alcohol by volume: 60–100 proof (30–50 vol-%)
- Colour: Clear
- Flavour: Typically raspberry, apple, pear, plum, cherry, peach, apricot, or peppermint

Schnapps (/ʃnɑːps/ or /ʃnæps/) or schnaps is a type of alcoholic beverage that may take several forms, including distilled fruit brandies, herbal liqueurs, infusions, and "flavored liqueurs" made by adding fruit syrups, spices, or artificial flavorings to neutral grain spirits.

The English loanword "schnapps" is derived from the colloquial German word Schnaps [ʃnaps] (plural: Schnäpse), which is used in reference to spirit drinks. The word Schnaps stems from Low German and is related to the German term "schnappen", meaning "snap", which refers to the spirit usually being consumed in a quick slug from a small glass (i.e., a shot glass).

== European ==
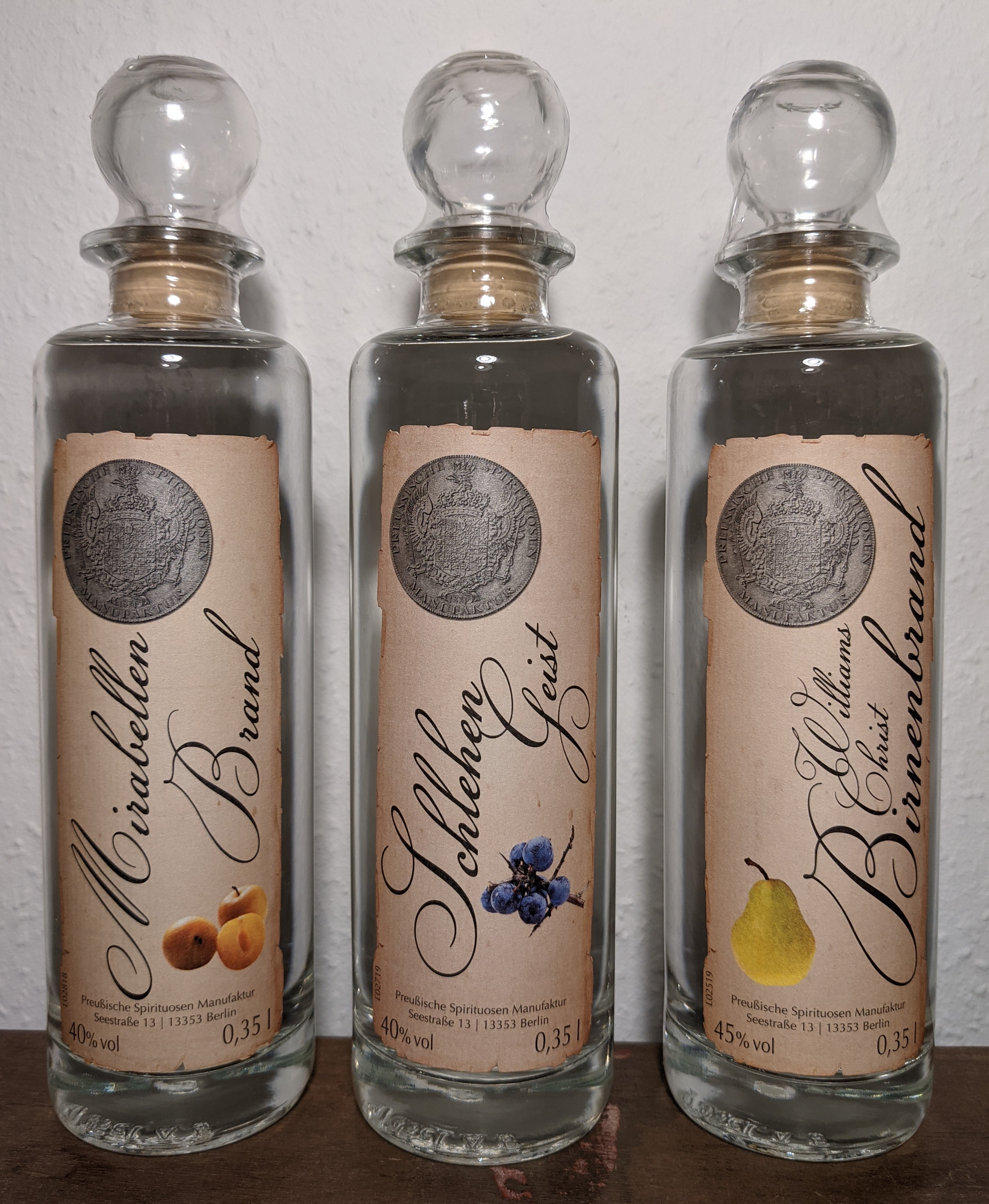
Three bottles of German Schnapps, made from Mirabelle plums, sloes, and Williams pears.

The German term Schnaps refers to "any kind of strong, dry spirit", similar to how eau de vie (water of life) is used in French, aguardiente (burning water) in Spanish, or aguardente in Portuguese.

=== Obstler ===
An Obstler, or Obstbrand (from the German Obst, fruit and Brand, brandy), is a traditional type of schnapps made by fermenting macerated fruit and distilling to produce a clear, unsweetened fruit brandy. Obstler is traditionally produced in Austria, Switzerland, northern Slovenia, southern Germany, and the culturally German regions of Alsace and Lorraine in modern-day France. Obstler is mainly associated with the southern part of the German-language area; in northern Germany, almost all traditional distilled beverages are grain-based.

The main kinds of fruit used for Obstbrände are apples, apricots, cherries, pears, plums (both mirabelle and purple plums), and quinces. Other fruits are rarely used. Apples and pears together produce Obstwasser (fruit water); pears are used to produce Birnenbrand; when made from the Williams pear, it is known as Poire Williams or Williamsbrand. Several types of plums make Zwetschgenwasser ("plum water"); cherries make Kirschwasser ("cherry water"); and apricots are used to make Austrian Marillenschnaps (apricot brandy).

The different kinds of Obstler are similar to the varieties of Rakija found in the Balkans and Eastern Europe. Slivovitz is a popular schnapps made from Damson plums found throughout the region; pálinka is a traditional distilled beverage made of any fruits grown in Hungary.

=== Geist ===
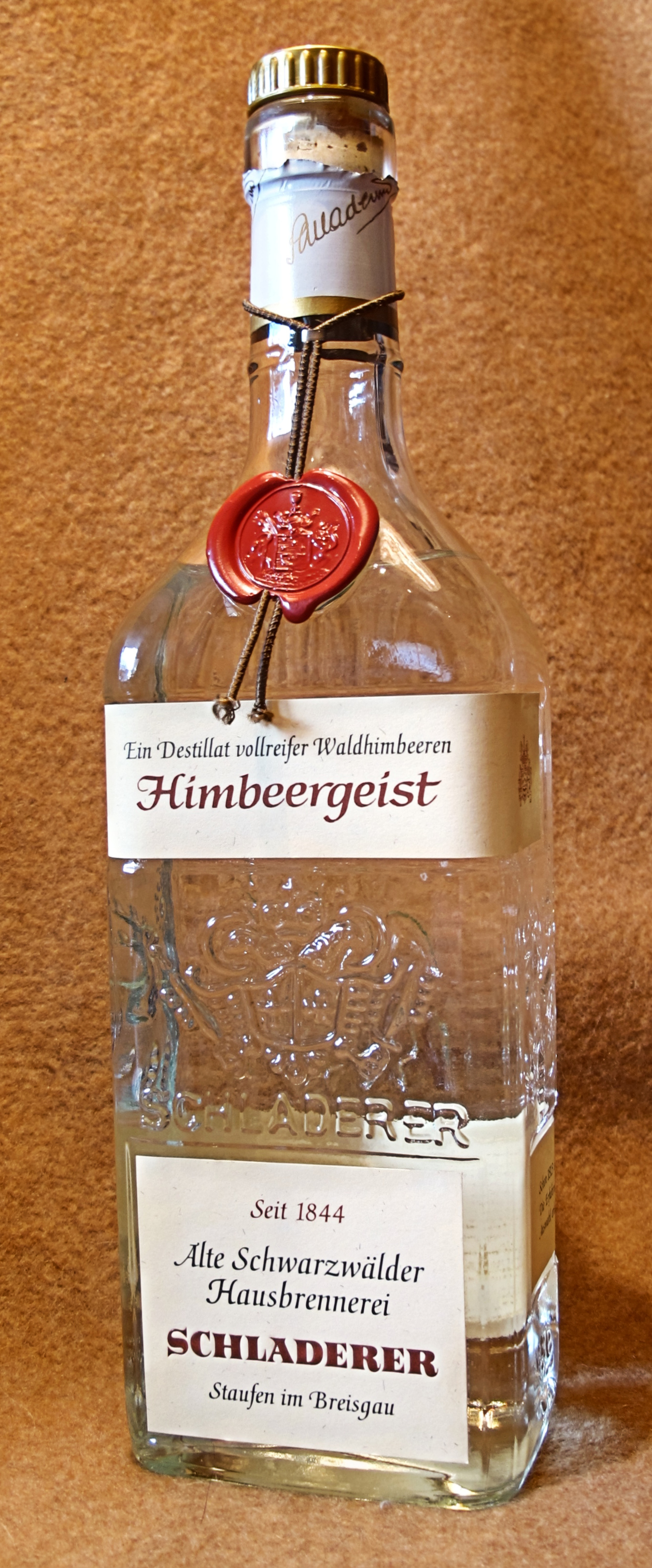
Himbeergeist made from wild raspberries in the Black Forest region of Germany

A Geist (meaning "spirit" in German) is a type of schnapps, similar to fruit brandy, that is created by infusing macerated fresh berries in neutral spirits and steeping for some time before distillation. Neutral alcohol is necessary because many berries have a sugar content too low to ferment and distill economically; raspberries, for instance, contain between 4.5 and 6.0% sugar.

The most common Geist is Himbeergeist, made from raspberries. Other common fruits are blueberries, blackberries, strawberries, currants, rowanberries, apricots, peaches, and sloes. Other flavorings are also possible, such as nuts, herbs, or rose petals.

=== Liqueur ===
Many liqueurs referred to as schnapps, but distinct from fruit brandies, are made by adding herbal or fruit flavors to a neutral spirit using various methods. The neutral spirit used can vary by location and tradition.

The most popular schnapps in the UK is peach schnapps. It is consumed in a variety of ways, such as on the rocks, or mixed with other drinks to form a variety of cocktails. It is made by adding peach flavouring to a neutral grain spirit. It is typically clear and has a strong, sweet taste. It became popular in the UK in the 1970s and 1980s. The leading brand is Archers, but some large supermarkets have their own branded peach schnapps, which is sold at a reduced price. Archers peach schnapps is more similar to the American style of schnapps.

Kräuterlikör (herbal liqueur) is similar to Italian amaro. Well-known brands include Jägermeister, Underberg, Kuemmerling, Killepitsch, and Wurzelpeter.

== American ==
An inexpensive, heavily sweetened form of liqueur is made in America by mixing neutral grain spirit with fruit syrup, spices, or other flavors. However, these schnapps are "not so sweet or heavy as such traditional liqueurs as Cherry Heering and creme de menthe." Sometimes coloring is added. Referred to as "schnapps", these are bottled with an alcohol content typically between 15 and 20% ABV (30–40 proof), though some may be much higher.

Peppermint was among the first commercially available American schnapps, introduced in 1940 by Minneapolis-based Ed Phillips & Sons. Fruit-flavored schnapps was first marketed by the brand Mr. Boston with an apple flavor in 1982. Subsequently, schnapps exploded in popularity in America in the 1980s, particularly peach and peppermint flavors. Other flavors marketed by 1986 included "apricot, banana, brandy, butterscotch, cinnamon, coffee, cola, cranberry, grapefruit, hazelnut, pineapple [and] chocolate," according to newspaper reports.

Schnapps had long been consumed by blue-collar drinkers, with higher-proof (up to 50% ABV) traditional peppermint or cinnamon schnapps drunk as a shot with a beer chaser. But the introduction of new flavors led to a popular craze among young, wealthier urbanites for schnapps-based drinks dreamt up by creative bartenders such as the fuzzy navel (peach schnapps and orange juice). Between 1984 and 1985, the number of cases of schnapps shipped to retail stores increased 74% from 3.05 million to 5.3 million. In 1985, the first full year Peachtree Schnapps was sold, its manufacturer moved 1.3 million cases.

An Aber Gut (German for "but good") is a traditional Wisconsin cocktail made with a shot of brandy topped off with a splash of (usually peppermint) schnapps. It is popular in the fall and winter for its apparent warming properties; a similar drink is found in Minnesota called a Snowshoe.

== See also ==
- Brandy – Spirit produced by distilling wine
- Korn (liquor) – German colorless grain spirit
- Pálenka – Czech and Slovak distilled alcohol, especially fruit brandy
- Pálinka – Central European alcohol
- Snaps – Small shot of a strong alcoholic beverage taken during the course of a meal
