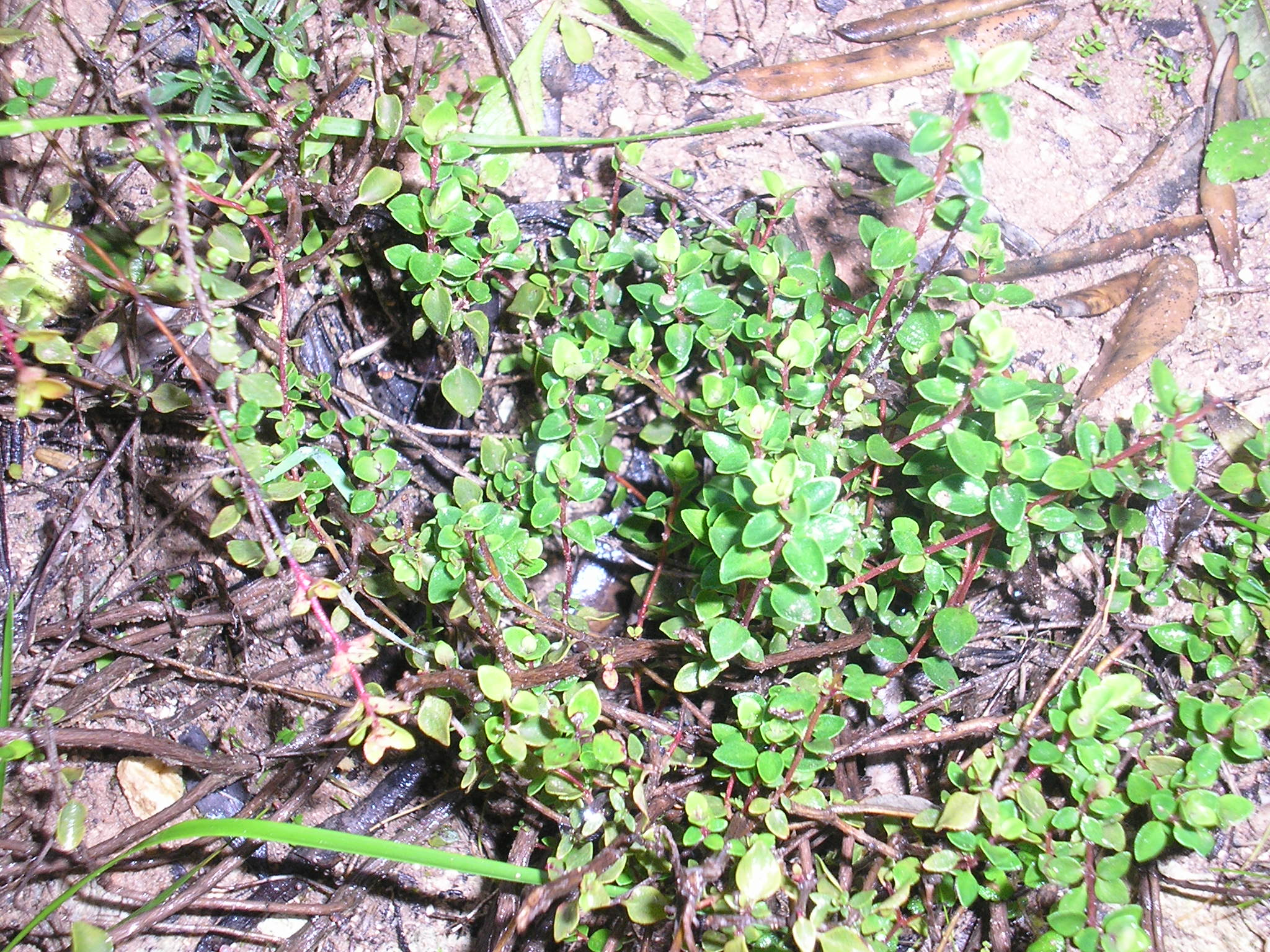
- Habit

Scientific classification
- Kingdom: Plantae
- Clade: Tracheophytes
- Clade: Angiosperms
- Clade: Eudicots
- Clade: Asterids
- Order: Lamiales
- Family: Lamiaceae
- Genus: Thymus
- Species: T. piperella

Binomial name
- Thymus piperella L.

Synonyms
- Calamintha piperella (L.) Rchb.; Origanum piperella (L.) Kuntze; Thymus marginatus Sm. ex Dicks.; Thymus rotundifolius Poir.

= Thymus piperella =

Valencian Thyme

Species of plant in the mint family

Thymus piperella, known by the common name valencian thyme, is a species of flowering plant in the family Lamiaceae, native to southeast Spain. It is used as a culinary herb, as a flavoring in a digestif called 'herbero', and to soften and flavor preserved olives.
