= Kräuterlikör =

Herbal liqueur

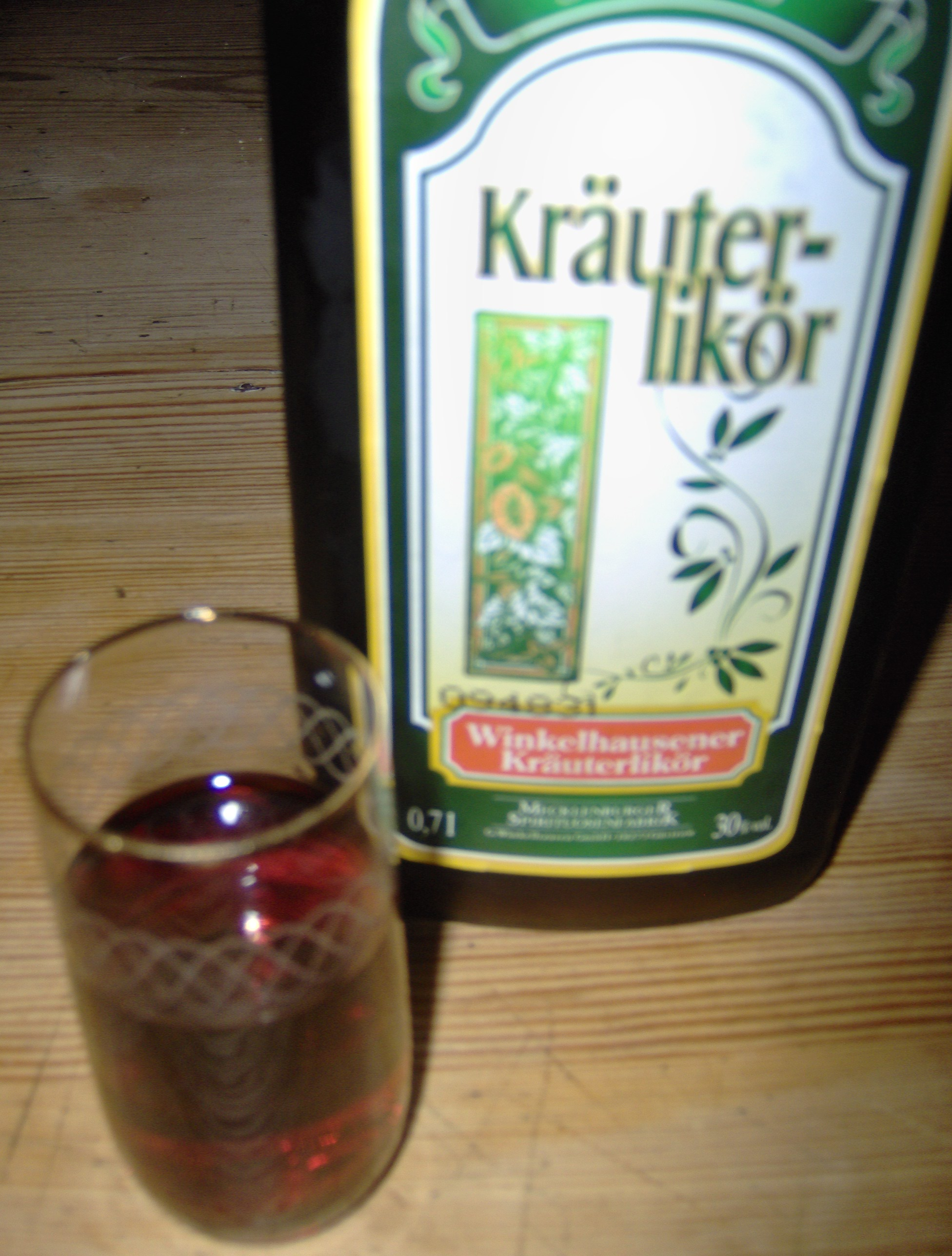
A bottle of German Kräuterlikör.

Kräuterlikör (German: [ˈkʀɔɪtɐlikøːɐ]) (herbal liqueur or spiced liqueur) is a liqueur flavored with herbs or spices and traditionally drunk neat or on ice as a digestif, similar to an Italian amaro. A distinction is made between sweet herbal liqueur, Halbbitter (half-bitter), and Bitter (or Kräuterbitter). Herbal bitters are produced worldwide, and many regions in Germany have their own specialties.

The history of Kräuterlikör recipes dates back to medieval authors like Hildegard of Bingen. Mixtures of alcohol and bitter substances were used as medicine to increase bile and gastric acid secretion. Nowadays, Kräuterlikör is also served as an ingredient of different cocktails and long drinks.

Widely sold liqueur brands are Riga Black Balsam (Latvia), Jägermeister, Killepitsch, Kuemmerling, Schierker Feuerstein, Schwartzhog, Wurzelpeter, and Underberg (Germany), Gammel Dansk (Denmark), Altvater (Austria), Becherovka (Czech Republic), Unicum (Hungary), as well as Bénédictine and Chartreuse (France). In Italy, amaro ("bitter") liqueurs include Cynar and Ramazzotti.

== See also ==
- Fernet
- Gorki List
- Schnapps
