= Oskar von Riesenthal =

German forester, ornithologist, hunter, and writer (1832–1898)

Julius Adolf Oskar von Riesenthal (18 September 1830 – 22 January 1898) was a German forester, ornithologist, hunter and writer.

He was born in Breslau, Silesia (then in Prussia: now Wrocław, Poland), to a family of Austrian descent. His father died when he was a year old, and he moved with his mother to Oels (now Oleśnica), where he spent his childhood and early youth until matriculating from Gymnasium. He studied at the Eberswalde Forestry Academy in Neustadt-Eberswalde, becoming a Revierförster (district forest ranger) in the Tuchola Forest, where he began studying ornithology. In 1871 he became Oberförster (chief forester) in Altenkirchen, where he wrote his first book, Die Raubvögel Deutschlands und des angrenzenden Mitteleuropas (Birds of Prey of Germany and adjoining Central Europe). He later became Royal Forester for the Department of Agriculture, Forestry and Domains in Charlottenburg, where he stayed until his death in 1898.

== Works ==
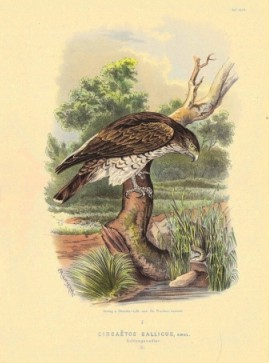
"Circaetus gallicus" by Oskar von Riesenthal

- Die Raubvögel Deutschlands und des angrenzenden Mitteleuropas, 1879.
- Das Waidwerk: Handbuch der Naturgeschichte, Jagd und Hege aller in Mitteleuropa Jagdbaren Thiere (The Chase: Manual of Natural History, Hunting and the Protection of Game Animals in Central Europe), 1880.
- Jagdlexikon (Hunting Lexicon), 1882.
- Die Kleine Jagd: Fur Jäger und Jagdliebhaber (The Little Hunt: for Hunters and Hunting Enthusiasts), 1884: he revised the fifth edition of this book by Friedrich Ernst Jester
- Die Kennzeichen der Vögel Mitteleuropas und angrenzender Gebiete (The Characteristics of the Birds of Central Europe and Adjacent Areas), 1891.
- Bilder aus der Tucheler Heide: galgenhumoristische Gesänge; zur Erbaulichkeit aller Grünröcke und ihrer Freunde (Scenes from the Tuchola Forest: gallows-humour songs for the edification of the greendresses and their friends), 1896.
- Die Stiefel des Herrn Oberforstmeisters, Der verrückte Keiler, sowie andere lustige Geschichten und Gedichte aus dem Leben eines alten Forstmannes (The Boots of the Chief Forester, the Crazy Wild Boar, and other Funny Stories and Poems from the Life of an Old Forester), published posthumously, 1903.

== Jägermeister ==
The first stanza from one of his poems, "Waidmannsheil" ("Hunter's Salute"), is printed on the Jägermeister bottle label.

Waidmannsheil

Das ist des Jägers Ehrenschild,
Daß er beschützt und hegt sein Wild,
Waidmännisch jagt, wie sich's gehört,
Den Schöpfer im Geschöpfe ehrt!

Das Kriegsgeschoß der Haß regiert, -
Die Lieb’ zum Wild den Stutzen führt:
Drum denk’ bei Deinem täglich Brot
Ob auch Dein Wild nicht leidet Noth?

Behüt's vor Mensch und Thier zumal!
Verkürze ihm die Todesqual!
Sei außen rauh, doch innen mild, -
Dann bleibet blank Dein Ehrenschild!

Translation:

This is the hunters shield of honor,
That he protects and fosters his game,
Hunts like a huntsman, as it should be,
Honors the creator in the creature!

The bullet of war is ruled by hate, -
Love towards the game guides the hunting rifle:
So think at your daily bread
Does your game not suffer either?

Protect it from man and animal as well!
Shorten its pain of death!
Be rough outside, yet gentle within, -
So your shield of honor remains unspoiled!
