= Apéritif and digestif =

Alcoholic drink normally served before or after a meal

Apéritifs (/əˈpɛrɪtiːf/; French: [apeʁitif]) and digestifs (/diːʒɛˈstiːf/) are drinks, typically alcoholic, that are normally served respectively before and after a meal.

== Apéritif ==
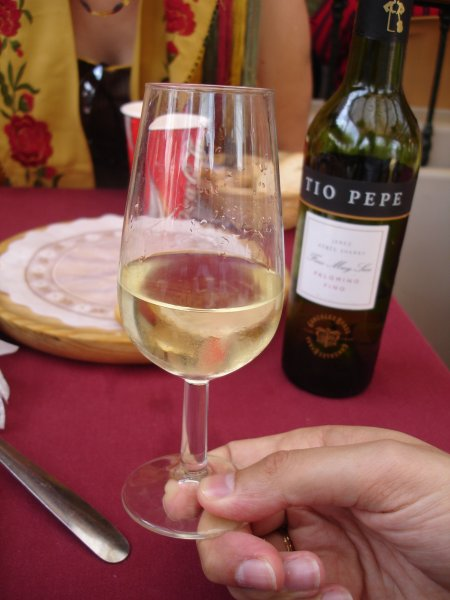
Fino sherry is a traditional apéritif.

An apéritif is an alcoholic beverage usually served before a meal to stimulate the appetite, and is usually dry rather than sweet. Common choices for an apéritif are vermouth, champagne, pastis, gin, ouzo, fino, amontillado or other styles of dry sherry (but not usually cream or oloroso blended sherry, which is very sweet and rich).

An apéritif may be served with an hors d'oeuvre or amuse-bouche, such as crackers, cheese, pâté, quiche or olives.

Apéritif is a French word derived from the Latin verb aperire, which means "to open". The French colloquial word for apéritif is apéro.

=== History ===
Apéritifs have existed since at least the fifth century as evidenced by the statement in Philokalia "People who wish to discipline the sexual organs should avoid drinking those artificial concoctions which are called 'aperitifs'—presumably because they open a way to the stomach for the vast meal which is to follow."

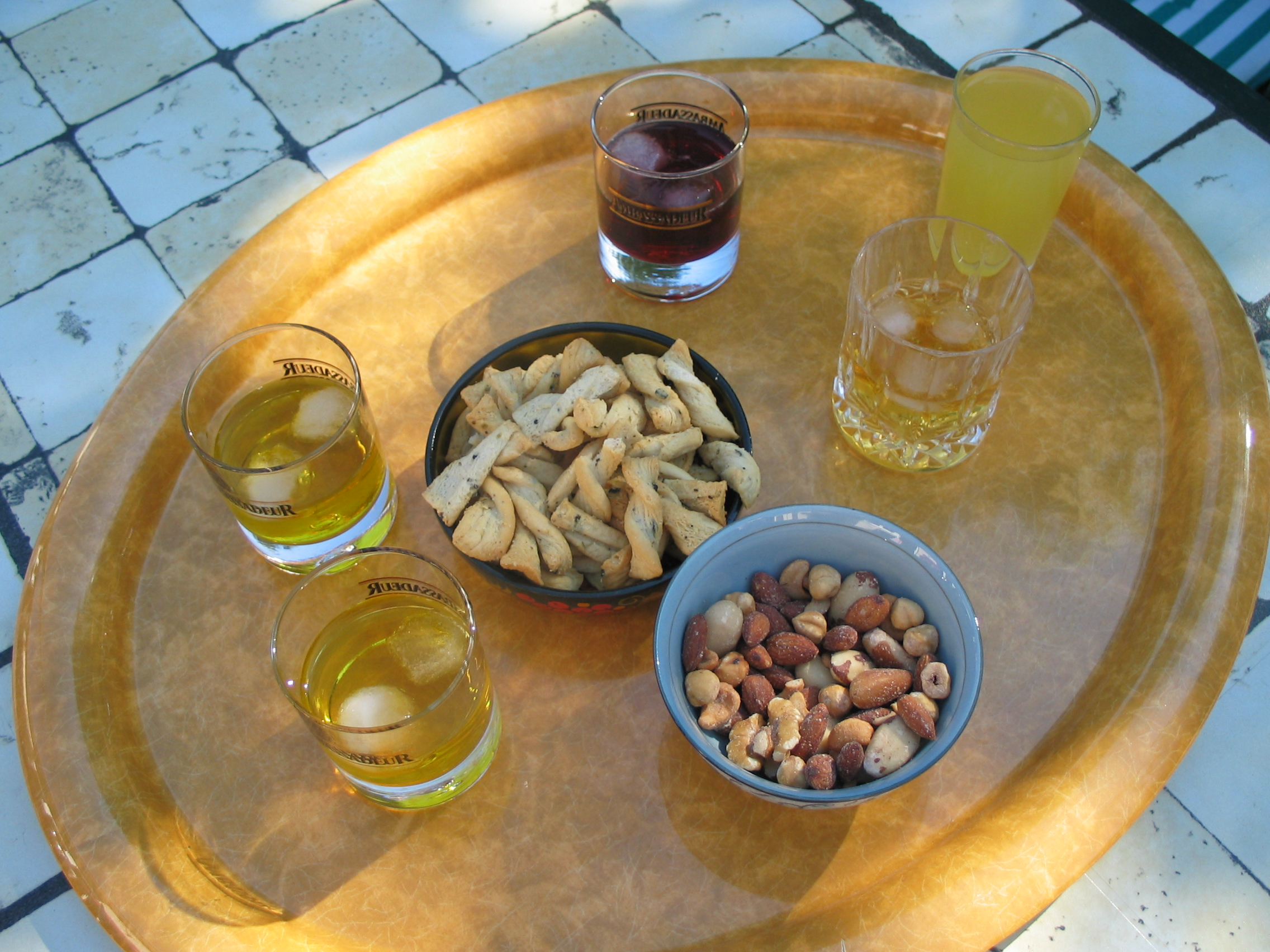
Apéritifs paired with mixed nuts and bread twists

Apéritifs became widespread in 19th century Italy, where they were being served in fashionable cafés in Turin (where modern vermouth was created), Rome, Genoa, Florence, Milan and Venice.

An apéritif known as Dubonnet was introduced in France in 1846, created by chemist Joseph Dubonnet as a means of delivering malaria-fighting quinine. The medicine was a bitter brew, so he developed a formula of herbs and spices to mask quinine's sharp flavor, and it worked so well that the recipe has remained well-guarded ever since. French Foreign Legion soldiers made use of it in mosquito-infested Northern Africa. Dubonnet's wife was so fond of the drink that she had all her friends try it, and its popularity spread.

Apéritifs became very popular in Europe, an appeal that crossed the Atlantic; by 1900 they were also commonly served in the United States.

In Spain and in some countries of Latin America apéritifs have been a complementary staple with tapas for centuries.. The custom of having appetizers with an apéritif crossed the Atlantic in the opposite direction in the 1970s, where the habit of a substantial food offering being paired with the purchase of a drink during happy hour in the United States pushed the development of a more food-heavy aperitivo course in Italy as well.

=== Types ===
There is no single alcoholic drink that is always served as an apéritif. Fortified wine, liqueur, and dry champagne are probably the most common choices. Because it is served before dining, the emphasis is usually on dry rather than sweet, as a general guideline.

- In France, the apéritif varies from region to region: pastis is popular in the south of France, Calvados brandy in the Normandy region, crémant d'Alsace in the eastern region. Champagne wine or cognac may also be served. Kir, also called blanc-cassis, is a common and very popular apéritif-cocktail made with a measure of crème de cassis (blackcurrant liqueur) topped up with white wine like bourgogne aligoté. The name "Kir royal" is used when white wine is replaced with a champagne wine. A simple glass of red wine, such as Beaujolais nouveau, can also be presented as an apéritif, accompanied by amuse-bouches.
- In Italy, vermouth or wine may be served as the apéritif (called aperitivo). Aperol spritz and Campari with soda are also popular aperitivo drinks of choice.
- In the Eastern Mediterranean, arak is served with meze.
- In Britain and Ireland sherry and dry Madeira are traditional apéritifs.

== Digestif ==
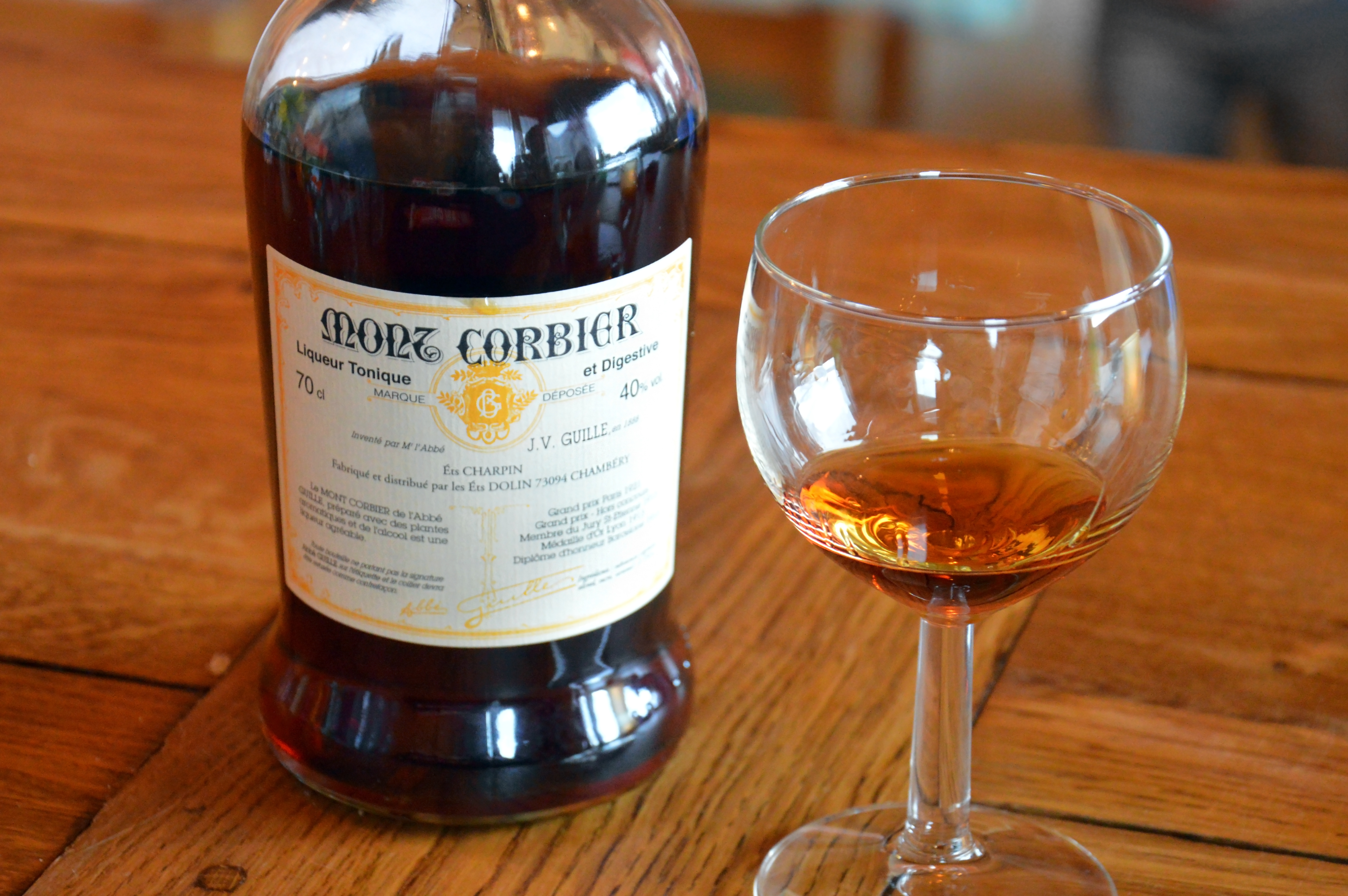
Le Mont Corbier liqueur served as a digestif

A digestif is an alcoholic beverage served after a meal, traditionally believed to aid digestion although there is no strong evidence to support this. Inversely, modern medicine instead suggests that alcohol, especially its overuse, has deleterious effects on digestion. When served after a coffee course, it may be called pousse-café. Digestifs are usually taken neat.

Common kinds of digestif include:

- Brandy (cognac, Armagnac, alembic-made)
  - Chacha
  - Eau de vie (fruit brandies, schnapps, Calvados)
  - Pomace brandy (grappa, tsikoudia, orujo)
- Fortified wines (sweet sherry (usually cream or oloroso sherry), Vermouth, port, Madeira, and ratafia)
- Liqueurs bitter or sweet (Drambuie, amaretto, Bénédictine, amari (such as fernet), herbal liqueur, sambuca, Chartreuse, Galliano, Grand Marnier, Jägermeister, Irish Mist, Kahlúa, limoncello, Herbs de Majorca, Beirão, pelinkovac, Unicum, Underberg, Fernet-Branca, mirto, Jeppson's Malört)
- Distilled liquors (ouzo, schnapps, tequila, or akvavit)
- Liquor cocktails (Black Russian, Rusty nail, etc.)

Bitter digestifs typically contain carminative herbs, with the intention of aiding digestion.

In many countries, people drink alcoholic beverages at lunch and dinner. Studies have found that when food is eaten before drinking alcohol, alcohol absorption is reduced and the rate at which alcohol is eliminated from the blood is increased. The mechanism for the faster alcohol elimination appears to be unrelated to the type of food. The mechanism is likely food-induced, which increases alcohol-metabolizing enzymes and liver blood flow.

== See also ==
- Bitters
- Happy hour
- Hors d'oeuvre
- Nightcap (drink)
