= Killepitsch =

Alcoholic drink from Düsseldorf, Germany

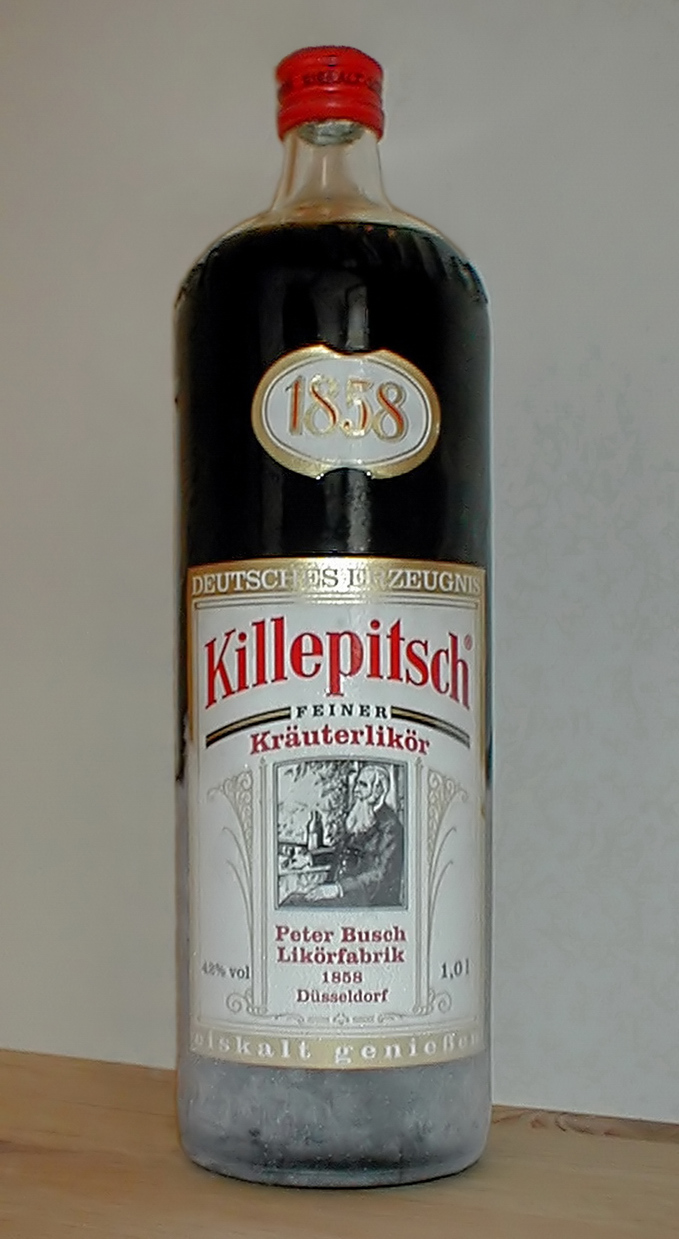

Killepitsch is a herbal liqueur from Düsseldorf, Germany. It is a blood red colour and is flavoured with fruits, berries, herbs and spices. Its alcohol content is 42% by volume. Killepitsch has been produced by Busch family of Düsseldorf since 1858.

== See also ==
- Jägermeister
- Kuemmerling
