= Wurzelpeter =

German herb liqueur

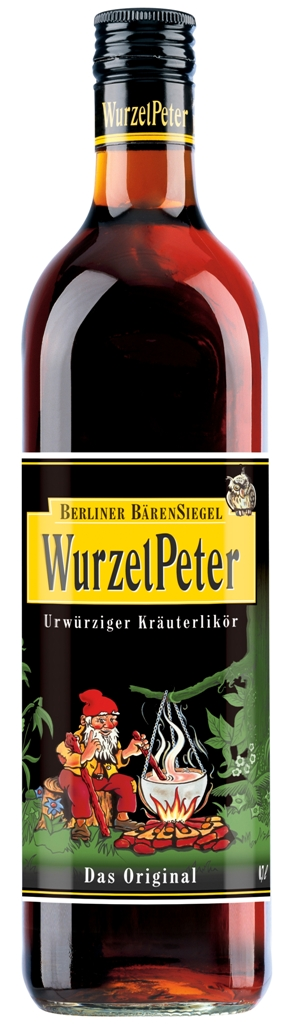
- Type: Kräuterlikör
- Manufacturer: Berliner Bären Siegel GmbH
- Country of origin: Germany
- Introduced: 1935
- Website: www.wurzelpeterworld.com

Wurzelpeter is a Kräuterlikör-type liqueur produced in Germany. It is flavoured with a variety of herbs, bark, and roots: its name references the latter (Wurzel in the German language).

== History ==
Production was started in 1935 in Berlin-Mitte by Paul Pöschke and Walter Heyer. The recipe was claimed to be documented as far back as 1875. Pöschke, a cycling enthusiast, organised sponsorship of cycling events by the company. In 1949 Heyer resigned, but the company was leased by Max Finke and continued in operation.

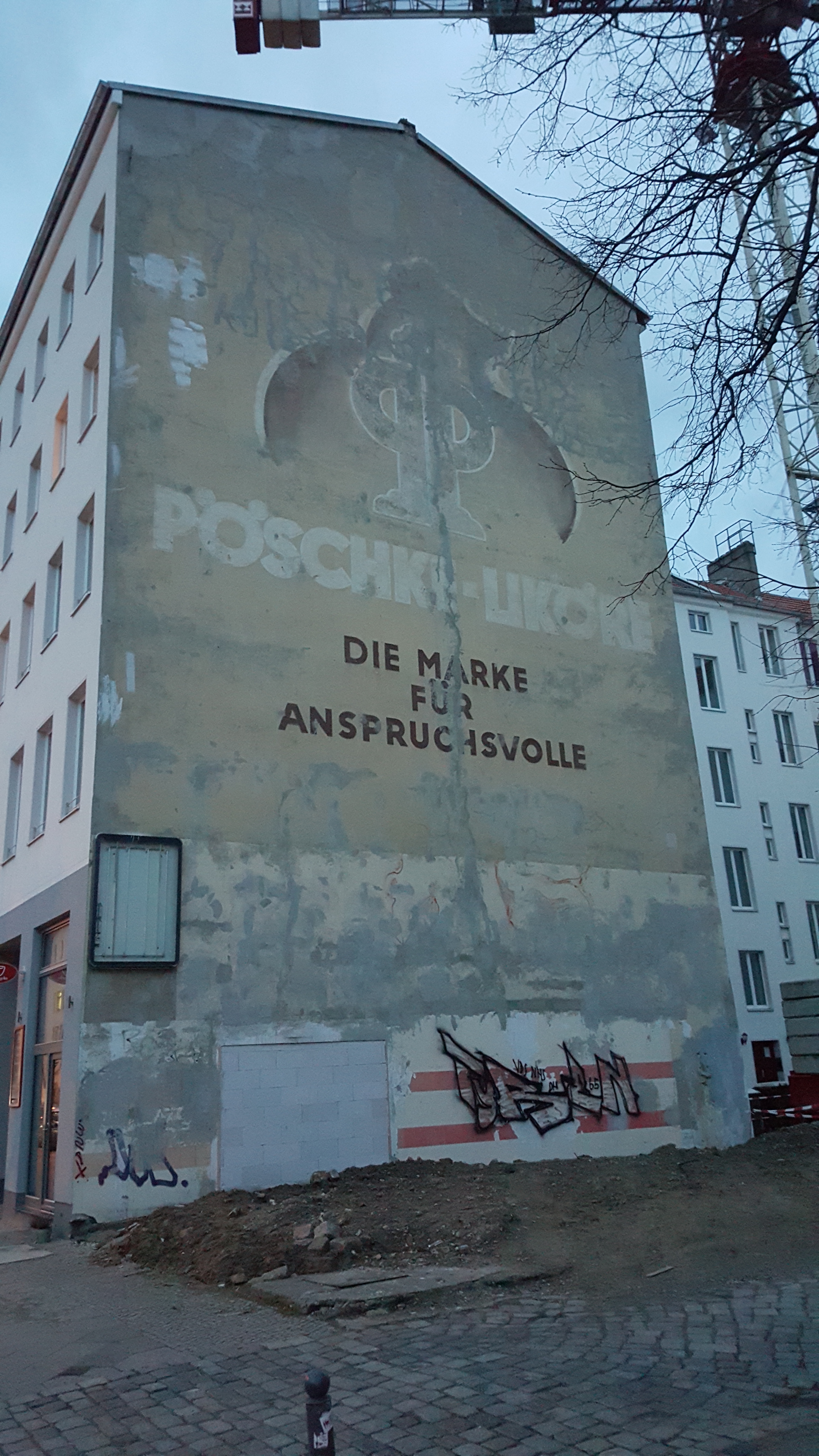
Advertising of c.1950 for Pöschke liqueurs at the company's former head office in Berlin-Mitte.

From 1961, when Pöschke departed for West Germany, production of Wurzelpeter was taken over by the state enterprise VEB Bärensiegel Berlin in Berlin-Adlershof. This company had its administrative headquarters in Berlin-Lichtenberg, on the Josef-Orlopp-Straße, where there was also a production branch. Wurzelpeter gradually gained some status as a cult drink, and was considered to be the East German counterpart of Jägermeister. With limited production, it had a reputation in the GDR as Bückware, scarce goods available 'under the counter' through bartering or to favoured customers.

VEB Bärensiegel Berlin became Berliner Bärensiegel GmbH after the fall of the Berlin Wall. In 1990 the company was acquired by Franz Wilhelm Langguth Erben, a winery with its headquarters in Traben-Trarbach, a municipality in the district Bernkastel-Wittlich. Berliner Bärensiegel GmbH continued to produce and bottle the herbal liqueur in Berlin-Lichtenberg. Despite international competition, former East Germans stayed loyal to the brand.

In 2017 Wurzelpeter's recipe was altered to a formulation said to be closer to that of 1935, along with an increase in strength from 30% to 40% ABV and a repositioning of the brand to emphasise its Berlin heritage. The labelling continues to emphasise the character, described as a kobold, traditionally featured in the brand's advertising.
