= Gorki list =

Bitter liqueur produced in Serbia

Gorki List
- Type: Herbal liqueur
- Manufacturer: Grenki List
- Country of origin: Serbia
- Introduced: 1953
- Colour: Ruby red
- Website: www.jedinipravi.com

Gorki List is a brand of pelinkovac, a bitter herbal liqueur based upon fernet. Gorki List was first produced in 1953. Its name means "bitter leaf" and alludes to its supposed herbal healing properties.

Until 2009, Gorki List was produced in Subotica, Serbia by the state-owned company Subotičanka. After 2009, when Subotičanka went into bankruptcy, its production and bottling was moved to Slovenia. The brand is owned by the Slovenian company Grenki List.
