= Licor Beirão =

Portuguese liqueur

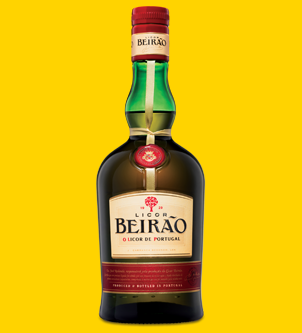
- Type: Liqueur
- Manufacturer: J. Carranca Redondo, Lda.
- Origin: Beira region, Portugal
- Introduced: 19th Century
- Alcohol by volume: 22% ABV
- Website: licorbeirao.com

Licor Beirão, commonly simply known as Beirão, is a Portuguese liqueur from the Beira region of Portugal. Originating in the 19th century, it is the most consumed alcoholic spirit in Portugal.

Production began in the 19th century in Lousã, in the Beira region, from where it got its name (Beirão means "from Beira"). It is made from a double distillation of seeds and herbs, including mint, cinnamon, cardamom and lavender, from all over the world, including former Portuguese colonies of Brazil, Sri Lanka, and India.

== Name ==
Beirão is a Portuguese adjective meaning "from Beira", the name of a former province in Portugal, currently contained within the country's Centro region. It got its name in 1929 in Castelo Branco, during Congresso Beirão, as a homage to the event.

== History ==
The liqueur was produced in the 19th century as a medicinal product for stomach aches by a pharmacy in Lousã. In the late 19th century alcoholic beverages were no longer qualified as medicinal but the liqueur was kept in production in a small factory owned by the son-in-law of the original producer. In 1929 the liqueur entered a contest on the 2nd Beirão Congress where it earned a gold medal and its name of Beirão. In 1940 the factory and the secret recipe were bought by José Carranca Redondo (1921-2005). In the 1960s Redondo drove Beirão to a nationwide success.

=== Advertising ===
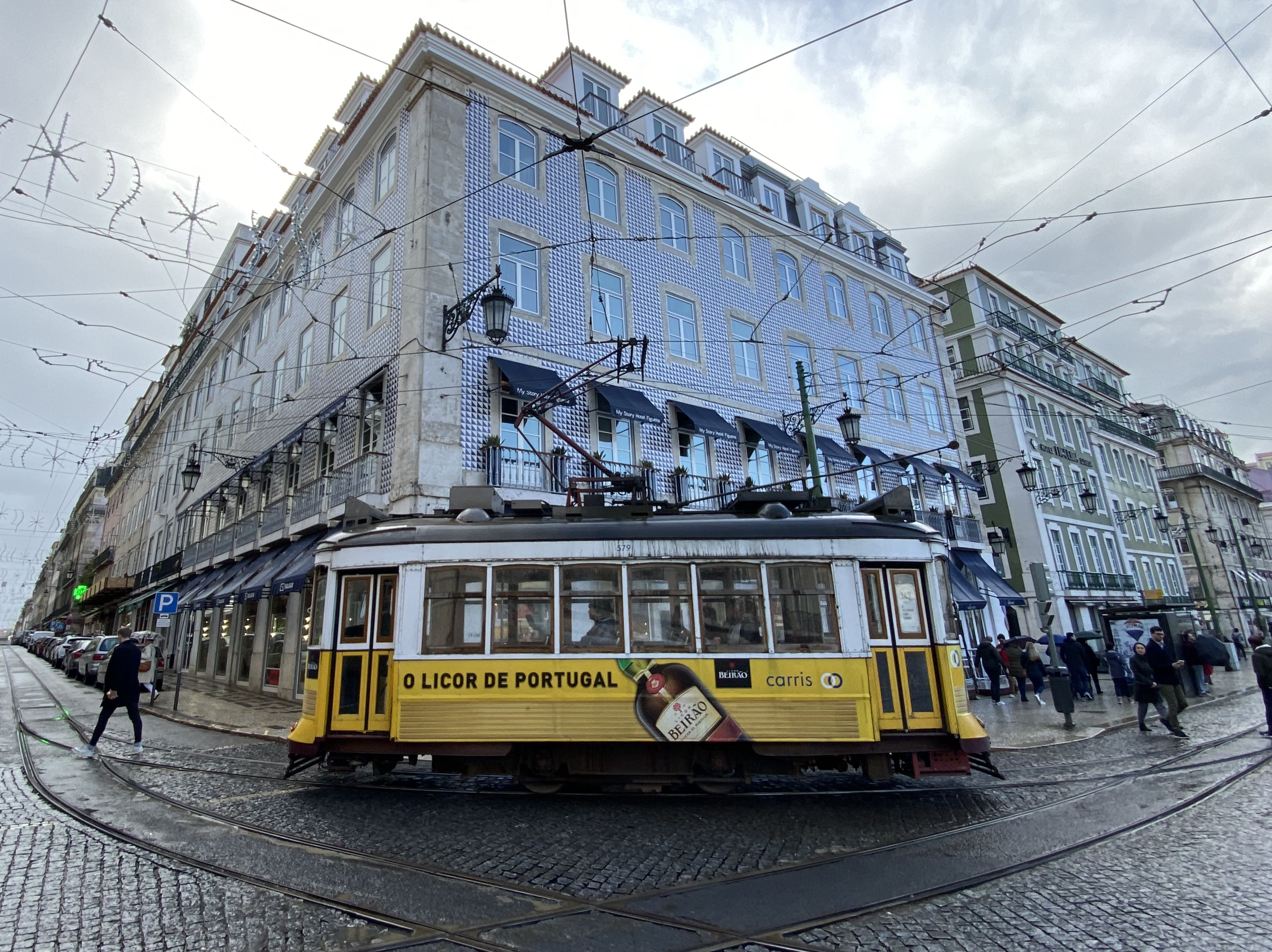
Advertisement on a Lisbon tram.

Redondo understood the importance of advertising - he used to say that "after laying an egg, the hen clucks" – so he launched the first Portuguese advertising campaign using billboards.

These first billboards, picturing a simple sign-board with "Licor Beirão, the liqueur of Portugal" on a country landscape, became an icon of Portuguese advertising.

A later billboard, picturing an American style majorette, wearing very short and tight red T-shirt and breeches, and showing her belly, had to be withdrawn because it was not well accepted due to the girl's unorthodox lack of clothing.

A punch line used by then, O Beirão que todos gostam (port. The one from Beira which everybody likes), had a subtle reference to António de Oliveira Salazar, "the one from Beira which not everybody likes", the leader of Portuguese authoritarian New State.

== Quinta do Meiral ==
The family estate, named Quinta do Meiral, was bought by Carranca Redondo in 1970. The Licor Beirão headquarters, factory and family residence are all located within it. The land, which is over 12 acres in size, produces some of the ingredients used in the liqueur's secret recipe, namely lavender and mint.

After being bottled, the liqueur is dispatched and distributed to Portugal and to all foreign markets (which make up about 25% of the sales share), always from Quinta do Meiral.

== Production ==
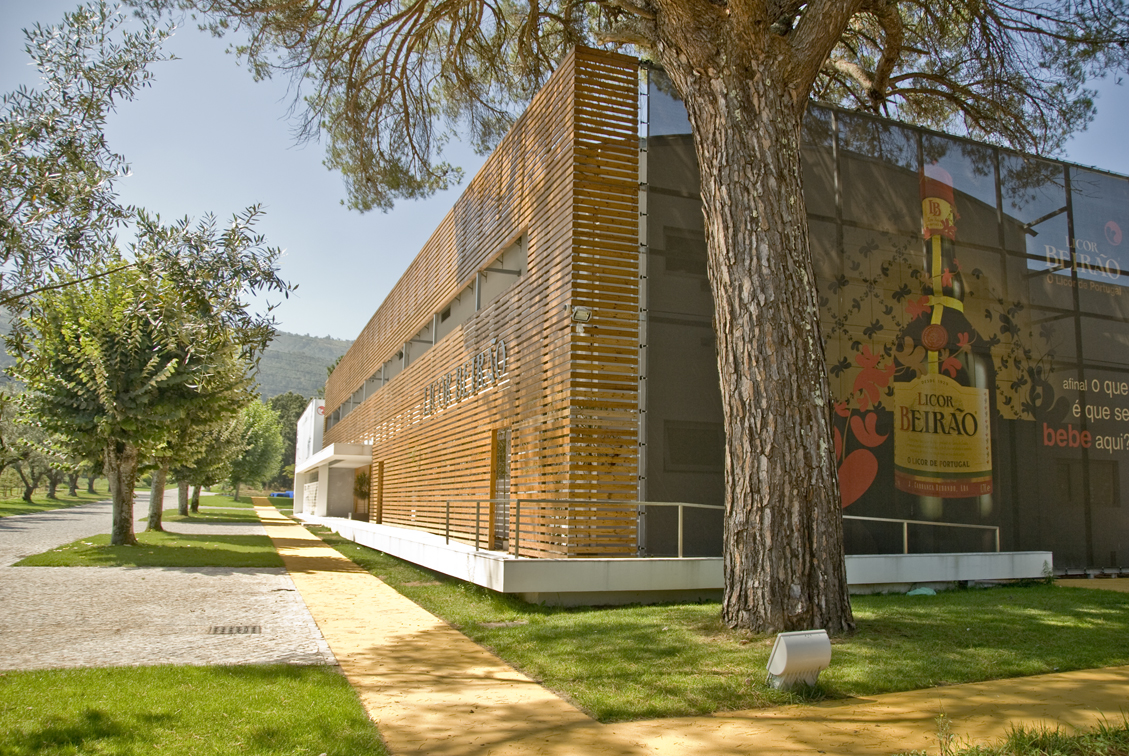
Licor Beirão factory in Lousã.

The liqueur is still produced and bottled at Quinta do Meiral, according to the original secret recipe, by double distillation of 13 different aromatic seeds, herbs and spices.

After being weighed out and mixed, the plants and herbs are mixed with alcohol, and remain in maceration for a minimum of about twenty to twenty five days. The resulting contents are then twice distilled in copper alembics.

The use of natural plants and herbs is one of this liqueur’s main distinctive factors, since it doesn’t make use of essences and artificial aromas — rather, the aroma used is produced locally, an alcoholate made from the base ingredients. Once the alcoholate is ready, it is then added into a mixture of alcohol, sugar and water. This mixture is then tested to ensure it fits the secret recipe’s parameters.
