= Unicum =

Hungarian herbal bitters

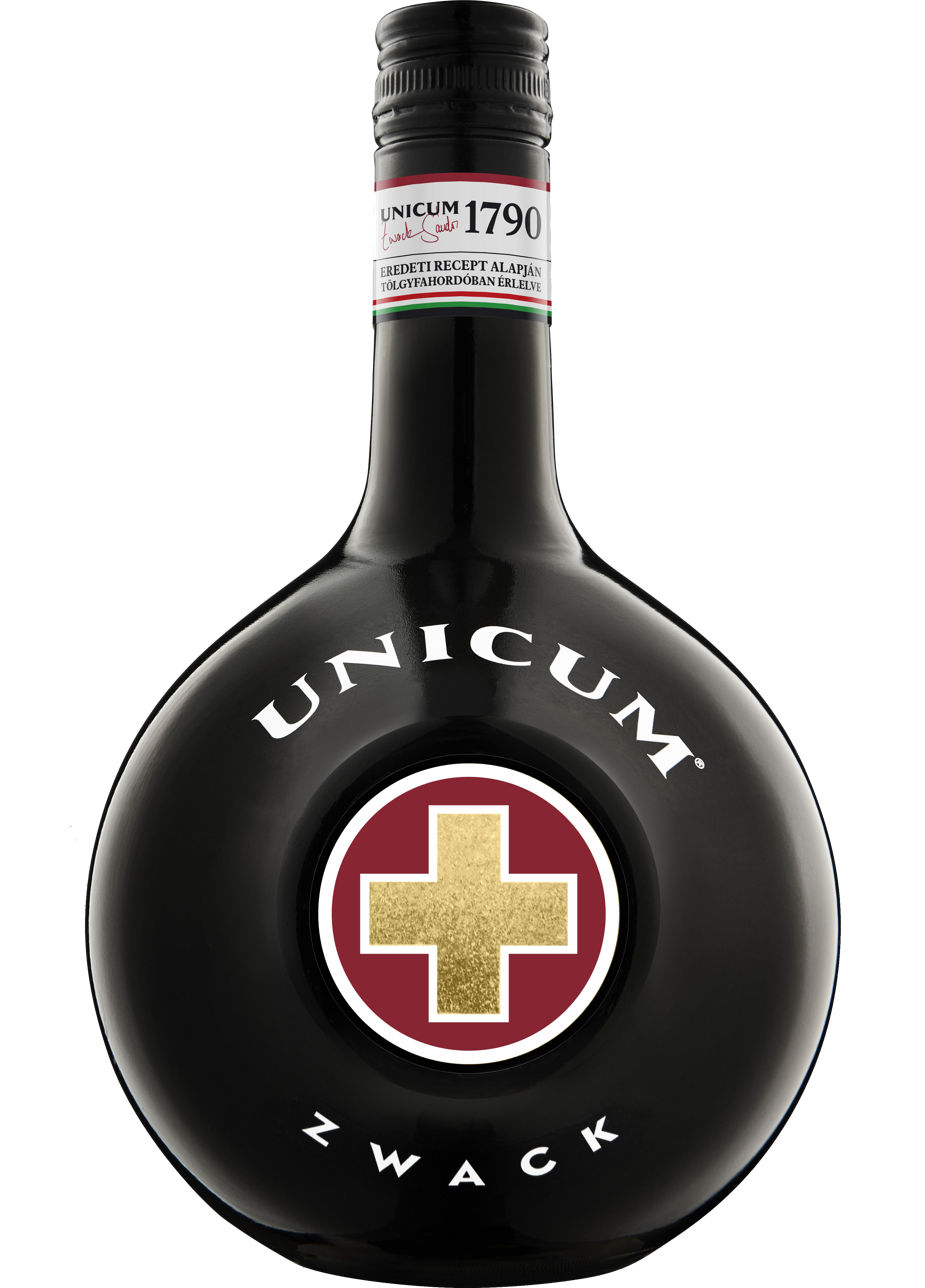
A bottle of Unicum

Unicum (pronounced [ˈunikum]) is a Hungarian herbal liqueur or bitters, drunk as a digestif and apéritif. According to legend the liqueur was created in 1790 and is today produced by Zwack using a secret formula of more than forty herbs; the drink is aged in oak casks. During communism in Hungary, the Zwack family lived in exile in New York City and Chicago, and Unicum in Hungary was produced using a different formula. Before moving to the United States, János Zwack entrusted a family friend in Milan with producing Unicum based on the original recipe. After the fall of communism, Péter Zwack returned to Hungary and resumed production of the original Unicum.

The texture of the drink is "thick, black, goopy", and the taste is so bitter that it is often described as an acquired taste. Legend has it that in 1790, Dr. Zwack, physician to the Imperial Court, first offered a sip of the herbal digestive to Holy Roman Emperor Joseph II, who, upon tasting it, exclaimed (in German), 'Das ist ein Unikum!' ('This is unique!').

Unicum is regarded as one of Hungary's national drinks. The production facility offers tours which include a tasting session of the multiple different varieties including Unicum and Unicum Plum. According to the manufacturer, the original Unicum is no longer distributed in the United States, having been replaced by Unicum Next (a sweeter, thinner-bodied drink with a more prominent citrus flavour), re-branded as "Zwack".

== See also ==
- Zwack liqueur – made from the same recipe (but not bitter)
- National symbols of Hungary
- Kräuterlikör
