= Underberg =

Digestif bitter beverage

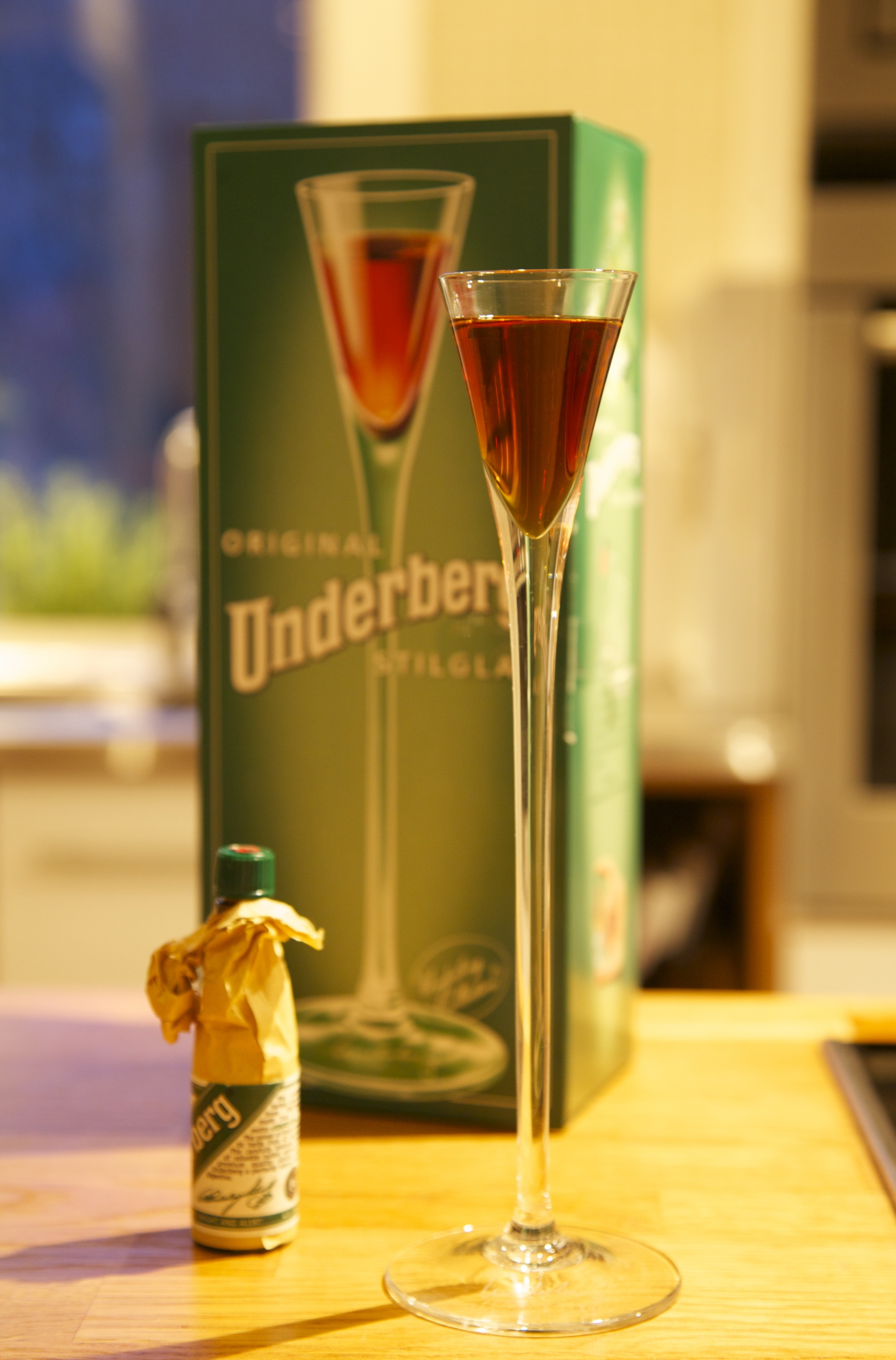
- Glass of Underberg with typical portion-sized bottle
- Type: Bitters
- Manufacturer: Underberg AG
- Origin: Germany
- Introduced: 1846
- Alcohol by volume: 44%
- Colour: Amber
- Ingredients: Distilled aromatic herbs
- Website: underberg.com

Underberg is a digestif bitter produced at Rheinberg in Germany by Underberg AG. It is made from aromatic herbs from 43 countries that undergo inspections and are formulated based on a secret recipe of the Underberg family. Underberg is one of the most widespread kräuterlikörs on the market. Underberg contains 1.3 percent herbal extract by weight. The drink is matured in Slovenian oak barrels for several months to enhance the taste. Underberg is classified under "food and drinks: oils, herbs and spices" in the United States and can be sold without any sort of liquor license.

== History ==
On June 17, 1846, Hubert Underberg founded the company H. Underberg-Albrecht in Rheinberg in Germany, starting the manufacture and sale of Underberg, a specialty made with aromatic herbs. In 1884, Hubert Underberg began to export his product to Brazil. In 1932, the grandson of the founder, Dr. Paul Underberg moved to Brazil and began to manufacture the "Underberg do Brasil". This product made in the country with Brazilian herbs has become, over the decades, an original Brazilian specialty and henceforth bears the name Brasilberg from the house "Underberg do Brasil".

Underberg had its recipe guarded by the Underberg family since the company was founded by Hubert Underberg-Albrecht in 1846.

Production ceased in 1939 due to lack of raw materials and was restarted in December 1949. The drink is usually associated with its portion-sized 20 ml bottle, designed in 1949 by Emil Underberg, grandson of the founder. All of its elements, including shape of the bottle, color, packaging and the Underberg name are trademarked and copyrighted.

To promote the brand, the Underberg company rewards branded merchandise to its users after collecting a certain number of bottlecaps.

== Gallery ==
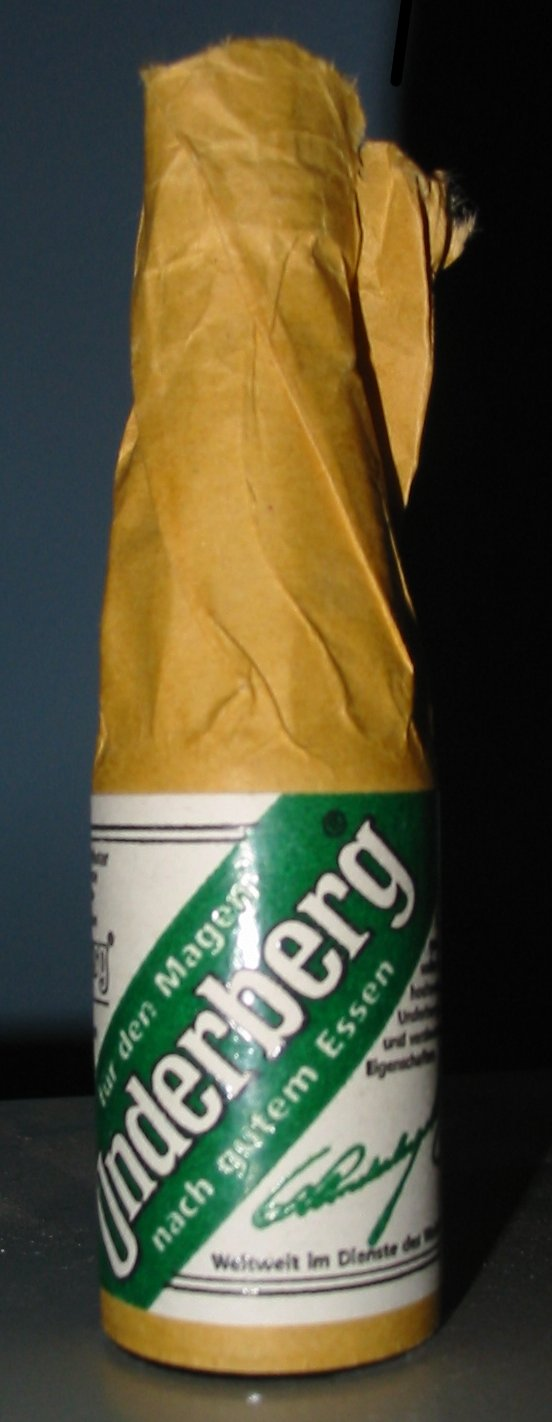
The 20 ml bottle, wrapped in paper

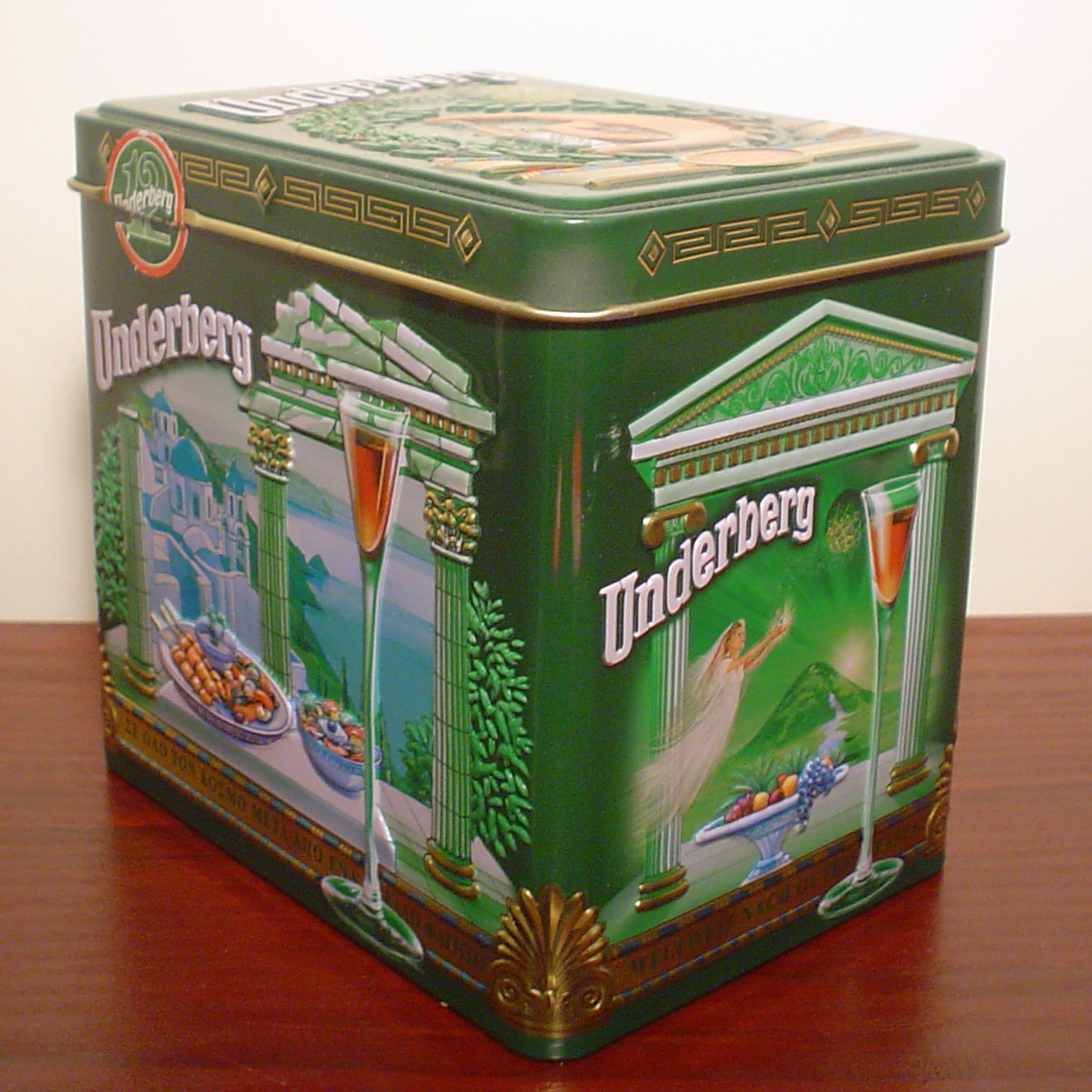
A metal case containing 12 little bottles of Underberg – 2007 Edition (Theme: Greece)

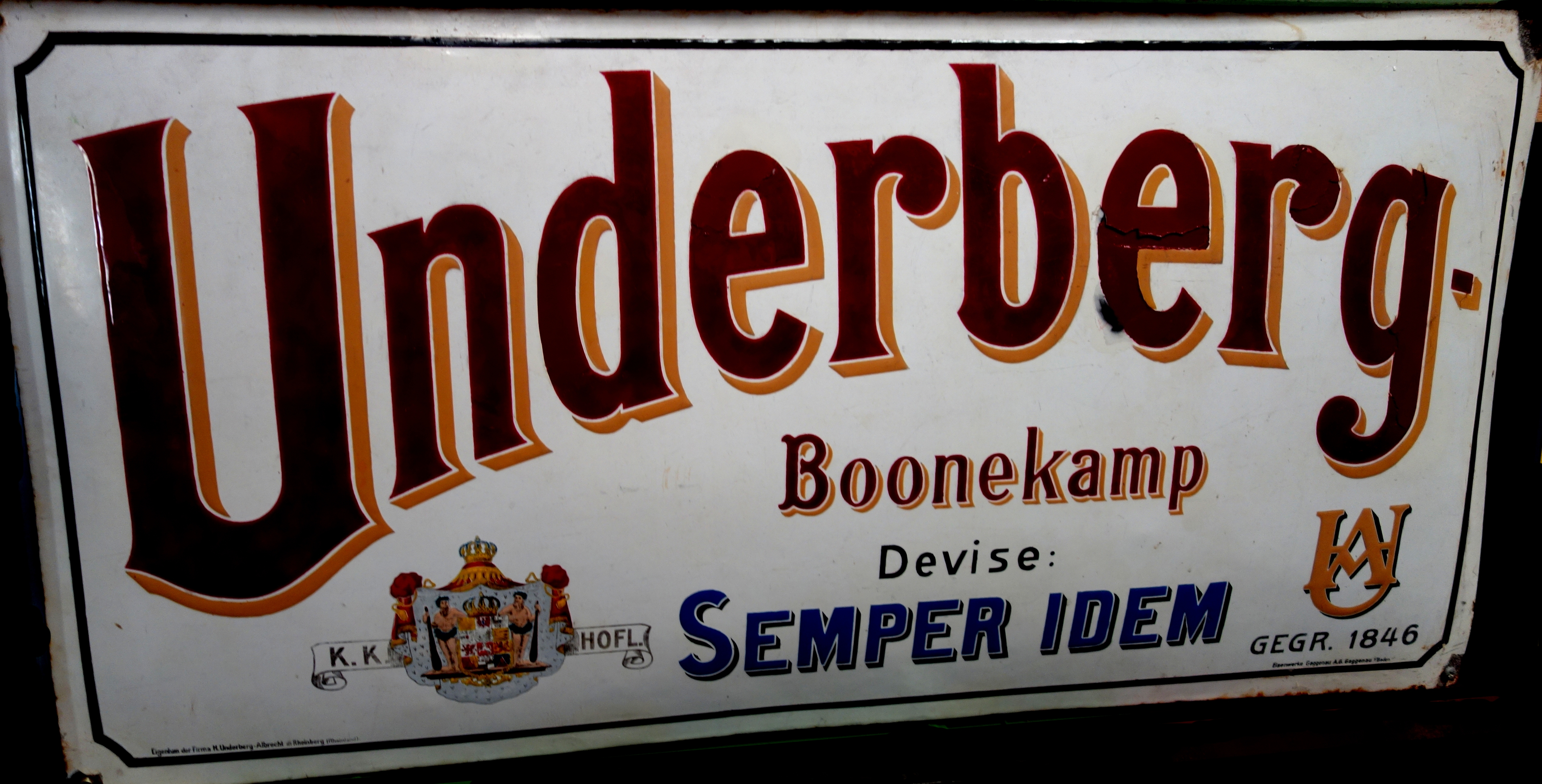
Old advertising sign

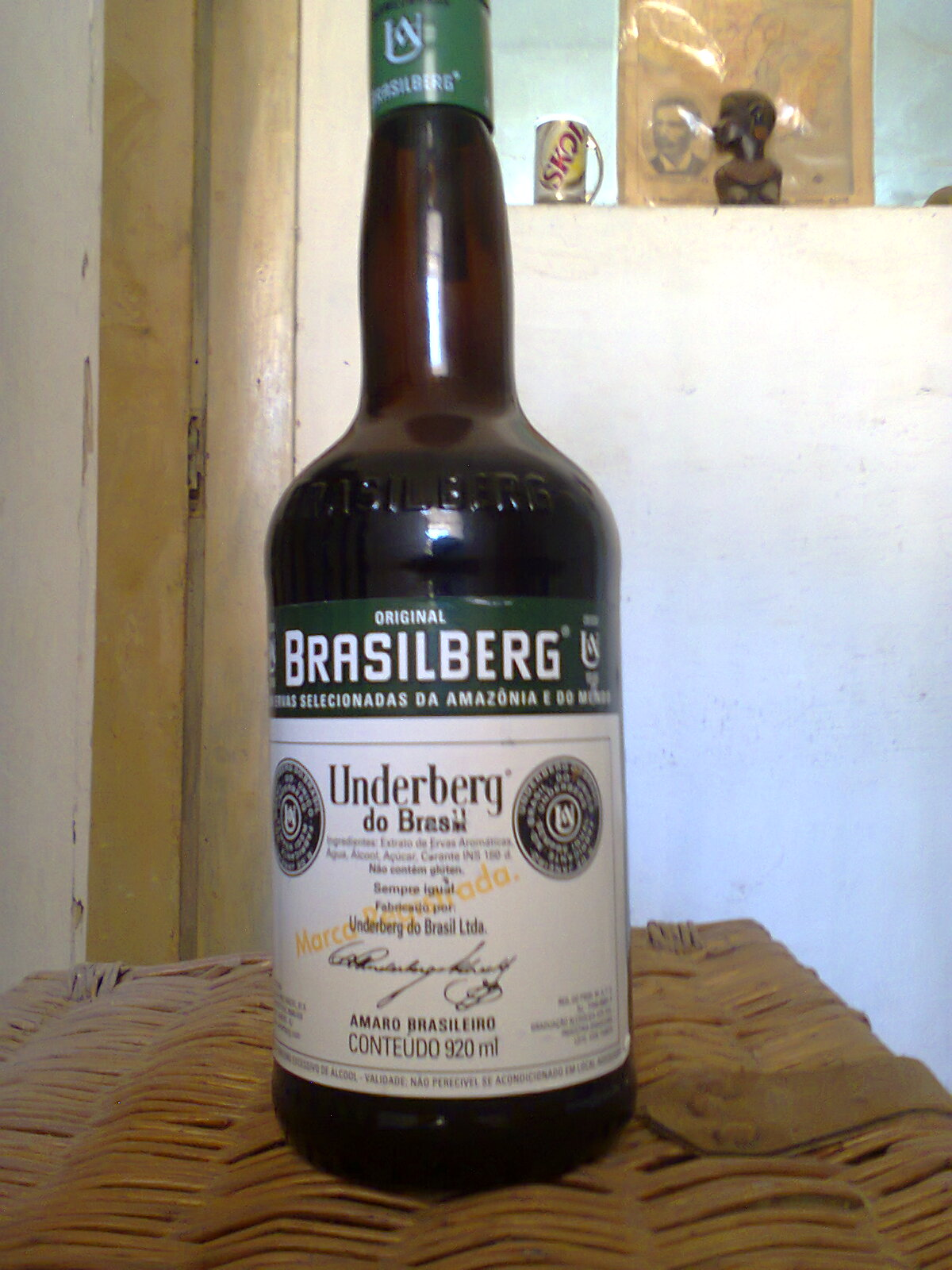
Big Brasilberg bottle, a variety of Underberg sold in Brazil

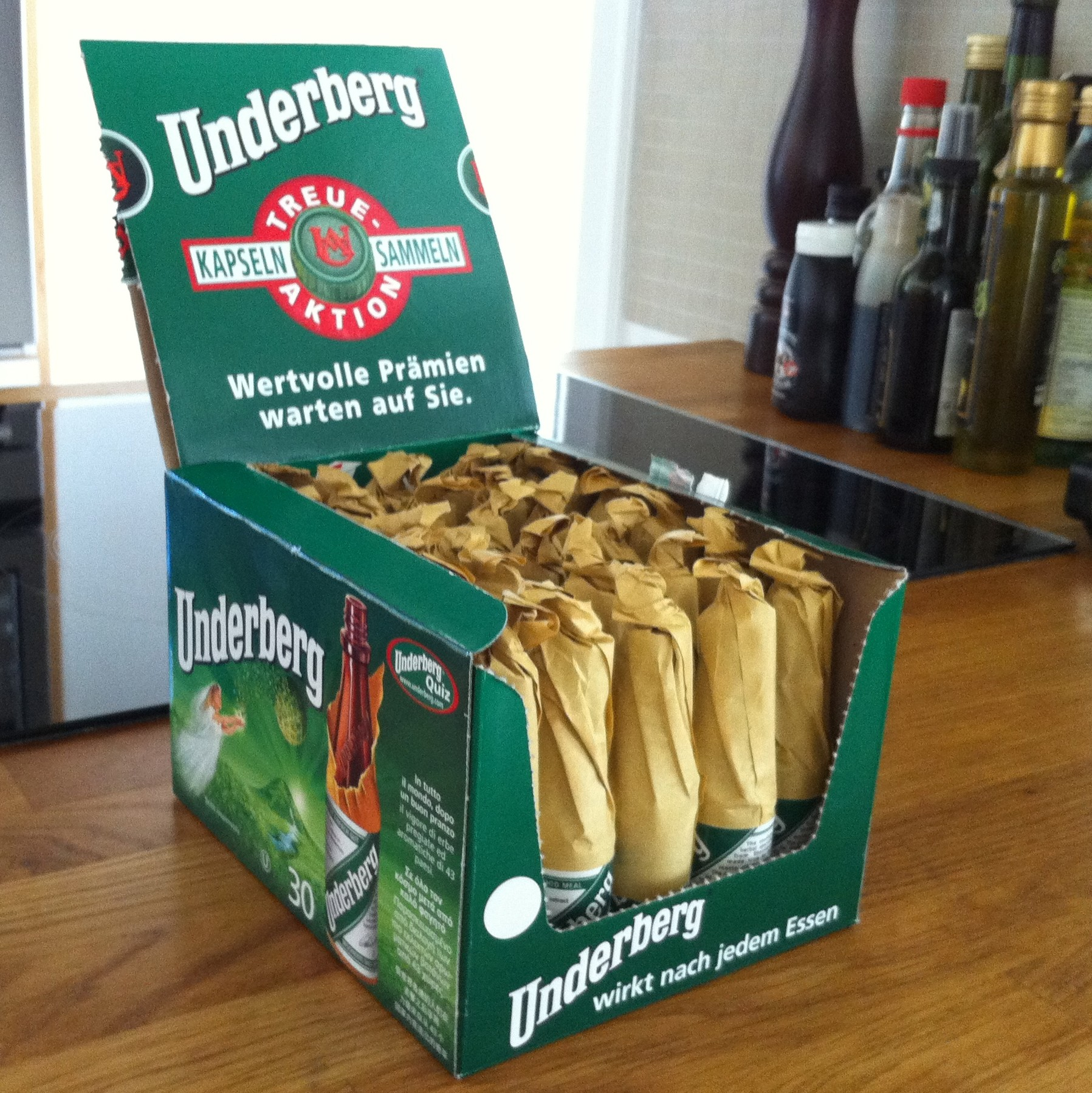
Box with the mini bottles

== See also ==
- Becherovka
- Kräuterlikör
- Unicum
