= Kuemmerling =

Type of herb liquor

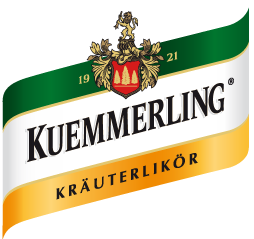
Kuemmerling Logo

Kuemmerling is the brandname of a type of Kräuterlikör (herb liqueur) from Germany, belonging to the group of Halbbitter (semi bitters).

This 35% by volume alcohol is a type of bitters. It has been in production since 1963 in Bodenheim, near Mainz, using a recipe from 1938. About one million 20 ml bottles are filled every day at the production facility. Kuemmerling was Germany's fourth-largest spirits brand and the second-largest brand in the bitters category in 2000. The family-owned company sold nearly 680,000 cases per year in 2000 and was bought out by Allied Domecq PLC in 2001; the company was acquired by Fortune Brands in the Pernod Ricard - Fortune Brands joint acquisition of Allied Domecq in 2005. Fortune Brands, then sold it to the German company Henkell & Co. (daughter-company of Dr. Oetker) in 2010.

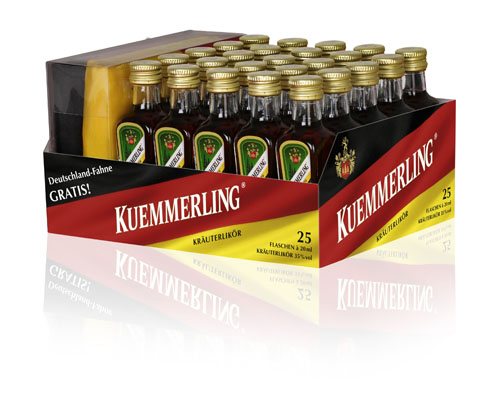

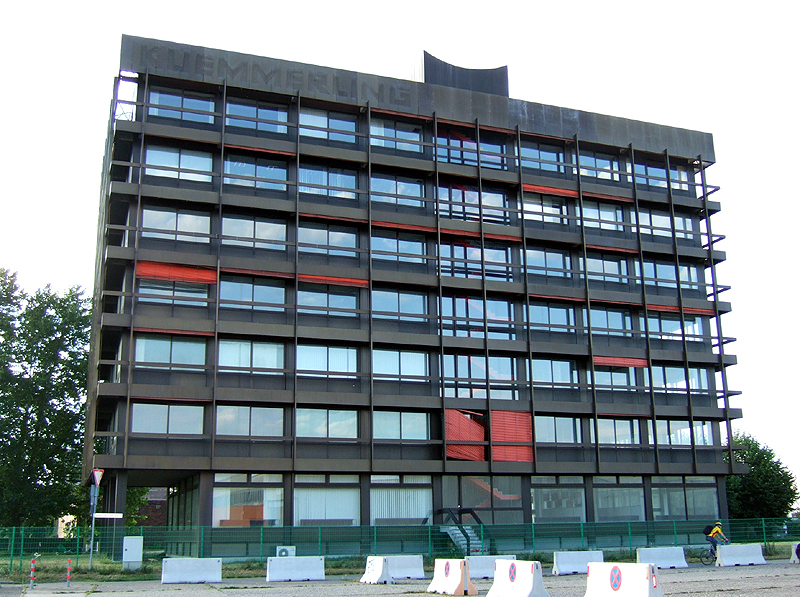
Former Kuemmerling offices in Bodenheim

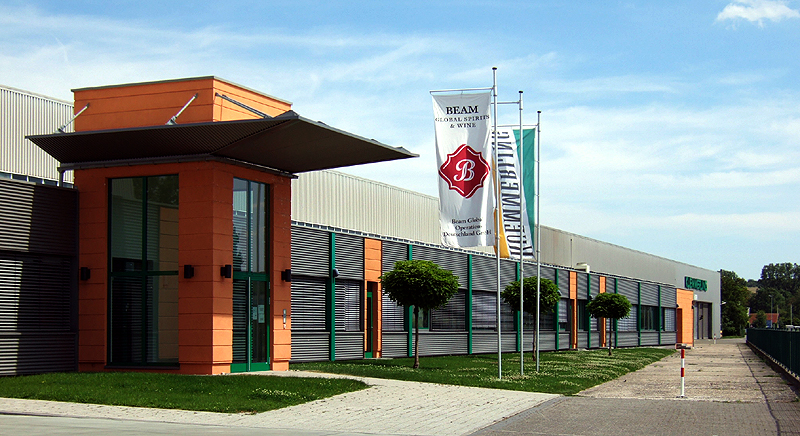
Kuemmerling production facilities in Bodenheim

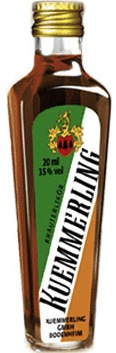
