= Cape Codder (cocktail) =

Cocktail consisting of vodka and cranberry juice

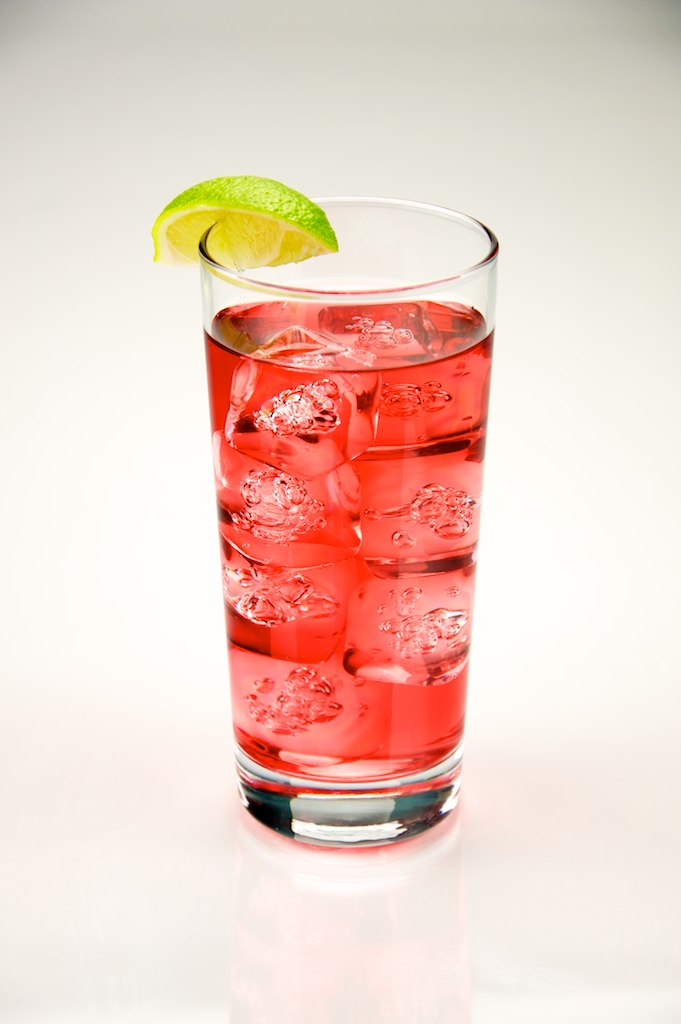
- Cape Codder
- Type: Cocktail
- Ingredients: Vodka; Cranberry juice
- Standard drinkware: Highball glass
- Standard garnish: lime slice
- Served: On the rocks: poured over ice
- Preparation: Build all ingredients in a highball glass filled with ice. Garnish with lime wedge.

The Cape Cod or Cape Codder is a type of cocktail consisting of vodka and cranberry juice. Some recipes also call for squeezing a lime wedge over the glass and dropping it into the drink. The name refers to Cape Cod, Massachusetts, a peninsula and popular tourist destination located in the eastern United States which is famous for growing cranberries.

== Ingredients ==
A Cape Cod is made with vodka and cranberry juice, and may be garnished with a lime wedge. Proportions vary, with sources giving a recommended vodka-to-juice ratio of 1/4, 1/3.7, 1/2 and 1/1.5, while other sources do not recommend precise proportions. Some sources recommend lime juice instead of a lime wedge garnish.

== Related drinks ==
The Cape Codder is related to a number of other cocktails such as the Sea Breeze (which adds grapefruit juice), the Bay Breeze (which adds pineapple juice), the Madras (which adds orange juice), the Woo Woo (which adds peach schnapps), Sex on the Beach (which adds orange juice and peach schnapps), the Cosmopolitan, which adds triple sec and lime juice, and Rose Kennedy Cocktail which includes club soda. The Grape Codder, in addition to vodka and cranberry juice, also has lime juice and grape juice. A Cape Codder with lemon-lime soda is called a JC Concord. A Cape Codder with lychee liqueur is a red lotus cocktail. A Cape Codder with raspberry liqueur is a purple haze.

== Background ==
This drink was conceived in 1945 by the Ocean Spray cranberry grower's cooperative under the name "Red Devil" on Cape Cod, Massachusetts. The "Cape Codder" name dates from the early 1960s.

== See also ==
- List of cocktails
