= Woo woo =

Alcoholic beverage made of vodka, peach schnapps, and cranberry juice

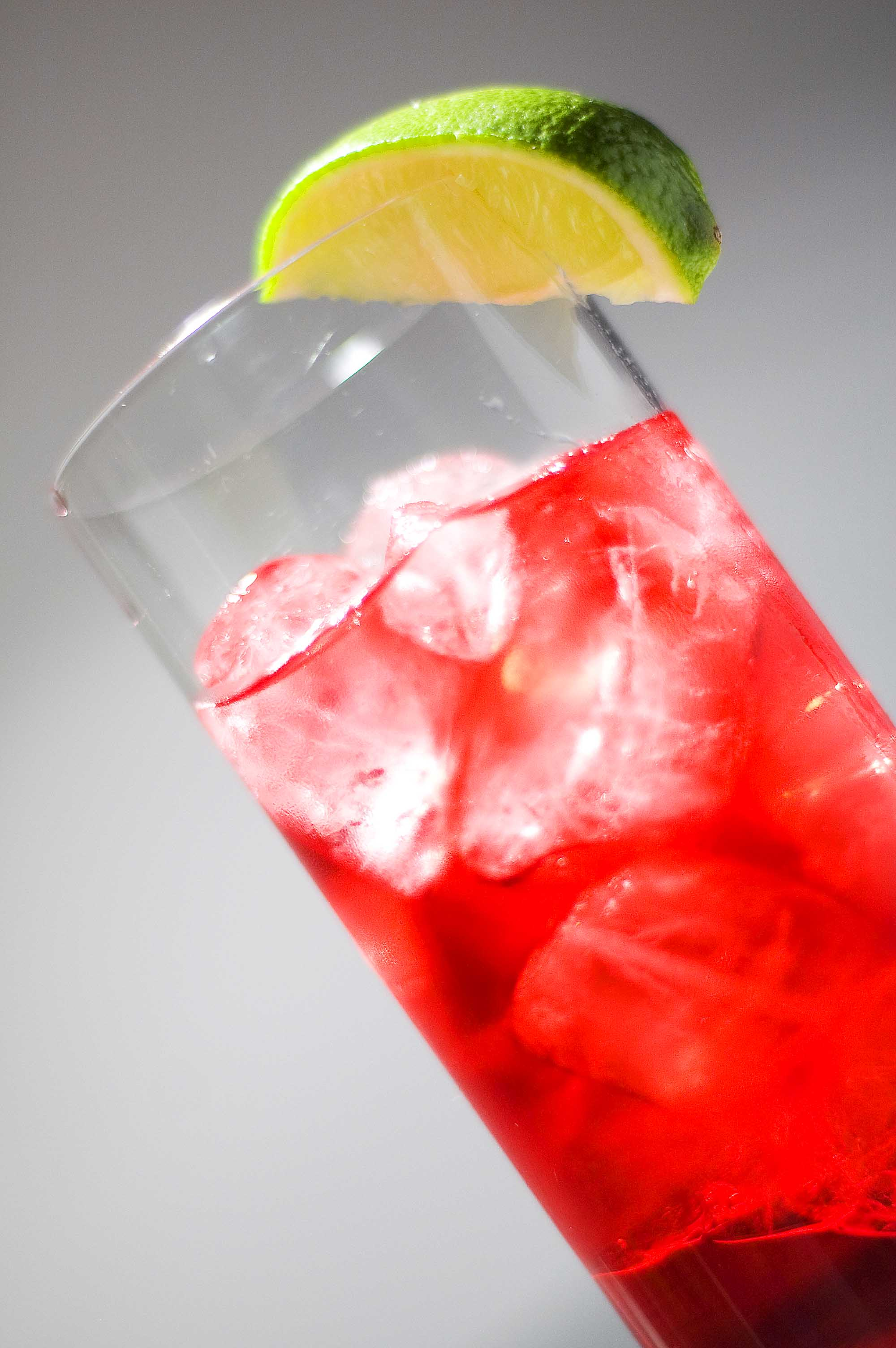
- The woo woo cocktail
- Type: Mixed drink
- Ingredients: 2 shots Vodka; 1/2 shot Peach Schnapps; 2 1/2 shots Cranberry juice
- Standard drinkware: Highball glass
- Standard garnish: Lime Wedge
- Served: On the rocks: poured over ice
- Preparation: Build all ingredients in a highball glass filled with ice. Garnish with lime wedge.

A woo woo (also called teeny weeny woo woo) is an alcoholic beverage made of vodka, peach schnapps, and cranberry juice. It is typically served as a cocktail in a highball glass or can be served as a shot. It can also be served in a rocks glass. The ingredients are shaken together with ice or stirred. A lime wedge is used as a garnish.

The drink became popular in the 1980s along with other cocktails containing peach schnapps such as the Fuzzy Navel and Silk Panties. Writing on the then-recent rise of peach schnapps in Esquire for March 1988, food and drink writer William Grimes commented:

In the "flavor-driven" cordial and liqueur market, peach has taken the lead. But where, exactly, are we being led? Into the land of very strange drinks. Lane Barnett, vice-president of James B. Beam Distilling, which bought National Distillers last May, asserts with a straight face that something called a Woo Woo (peach schnapps, vodka, and cranberry juice) is very big on the East Coast. He doesn't quite have the courage to come out with the drink's full name: Teeny Weeny Woo Woo. Do not order this in a strange bar.

The woo woo is a relative of the Cape Codder (vodka and cranberry juice) and both share highball relatives in the Sea Breeze, the Bay Breeze, the Madras, and Sex on the Beach. The baby woo woo is a shooter variation containing equal parts vodka, peach schnapps, and cranberry juice.

== See also ==
- Sex on the Beach, essentially a woo woo but in different ratios and adding orange juice
- List of cocktails
- Vodka cocktail
