= Rose Kennedy (cocktail) =

Cocktail

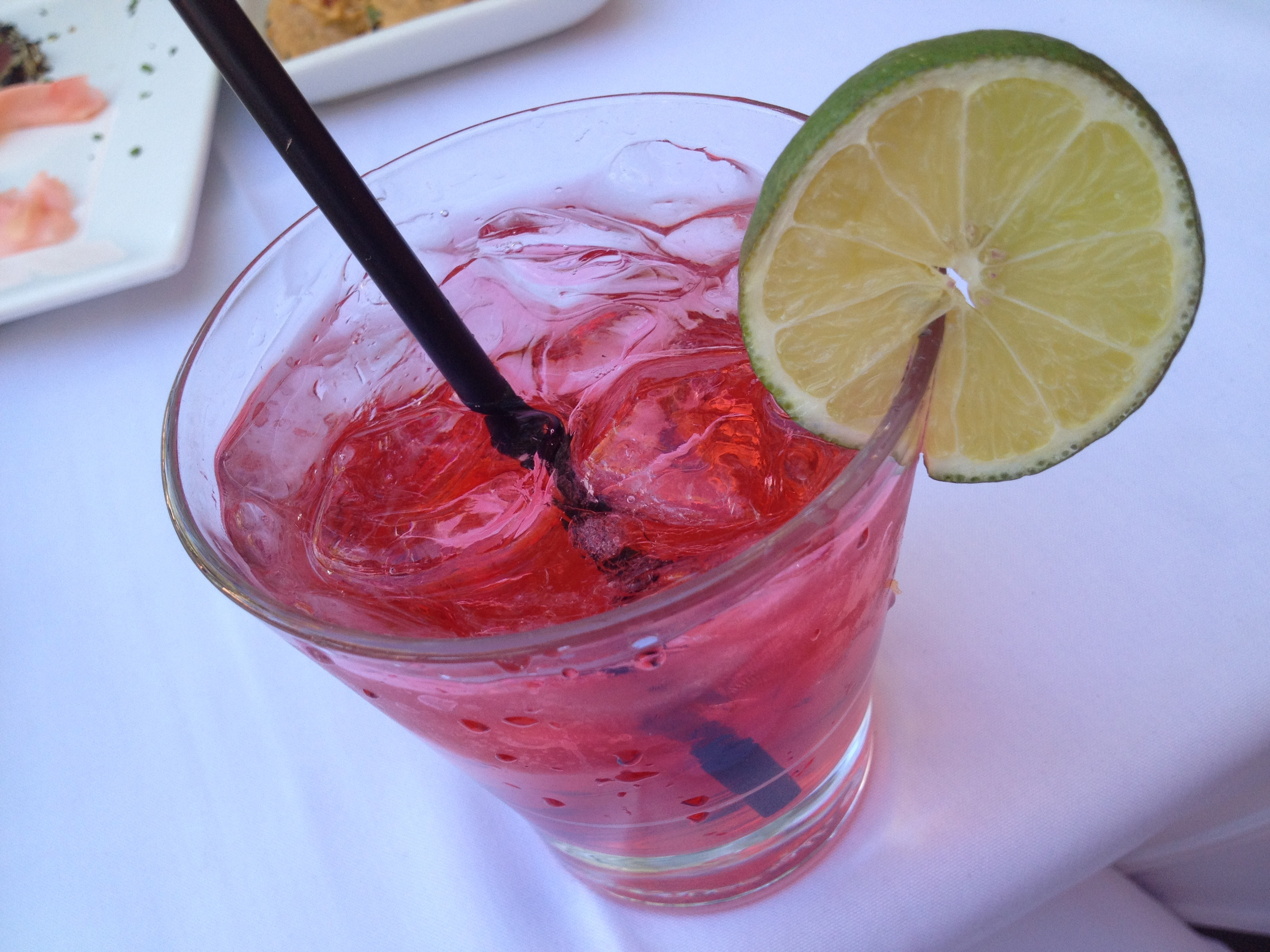
Rose Kennedy cocktail

Rose Kennedy (also known as a VSS, i.e. a vodka soda splash) is a cocktail popular in the mid-Atlantic and Northeastern United States. It consists of varying amounts of vodka and club soda, with a splash of cranberry juice adding flavor and color. Typically garnished with lime, the drink is based on the Cape Codder.

The cocktail's namesake is Rose Kennedy, matriarch of the Kennedy family in Massachusetts and mother of President John F. Kennedy.

== See also ==
- Vodka soda
- List of cocktails
