= Butterball (disambiguation) =

Butterball is a brand of turkey and other poultry products produced by Butterball LLC.

Butterball or Butterballs may also refer to:

== Arts and entertainment ==
- Butterball (Emery Schaub), a male Marvel Comics character
- Butterball (Vivian Dolan), a female Marvel Comics character
- Butterball Cenobite, a character from Clive Barker's Hellraiser franchise
- "Butterball", a track from the 1965 album Whipped Cream & Other Delights by Herb Alpert & the Tijuana Brass
- "Butterballs" (South Park), a 2012 episode of the TV show South Park
- "Boule de Suif", an 1880 short story by French writer Guy de Maupassant sometimes translated as "Butterball"
- Buttercup (fairy tale), a Norwegian fairy tale also known as Butterball

== People ==
- Lottie Kimbrough (1900–?), American country blues singer nicknamed the "Kansas City Butterball"
- Paul Scull (1907–1997), American football player nicknamed "Butterball"

== Other uses ==
- Butterball, a type of pastry similar to a Russian tea cake
- Butterball, a creek in Bassett Township, St. Louis County, Minnesota, United States
- Butterball, a colloquial name for the Bufflehead, a type of duck
- Cocksucking Cowboy, an alcoholic drink (shooter) also known as a butterball

== See also ==
- Krishna's Butterball, a gigantic granite boulder resting on a short incline in the historical town of Mahabalipuram in Tamil Nadu, India
