= Sea breeze (cocktail) =

Cocktail of vodka with cranberry and grapefruit juice

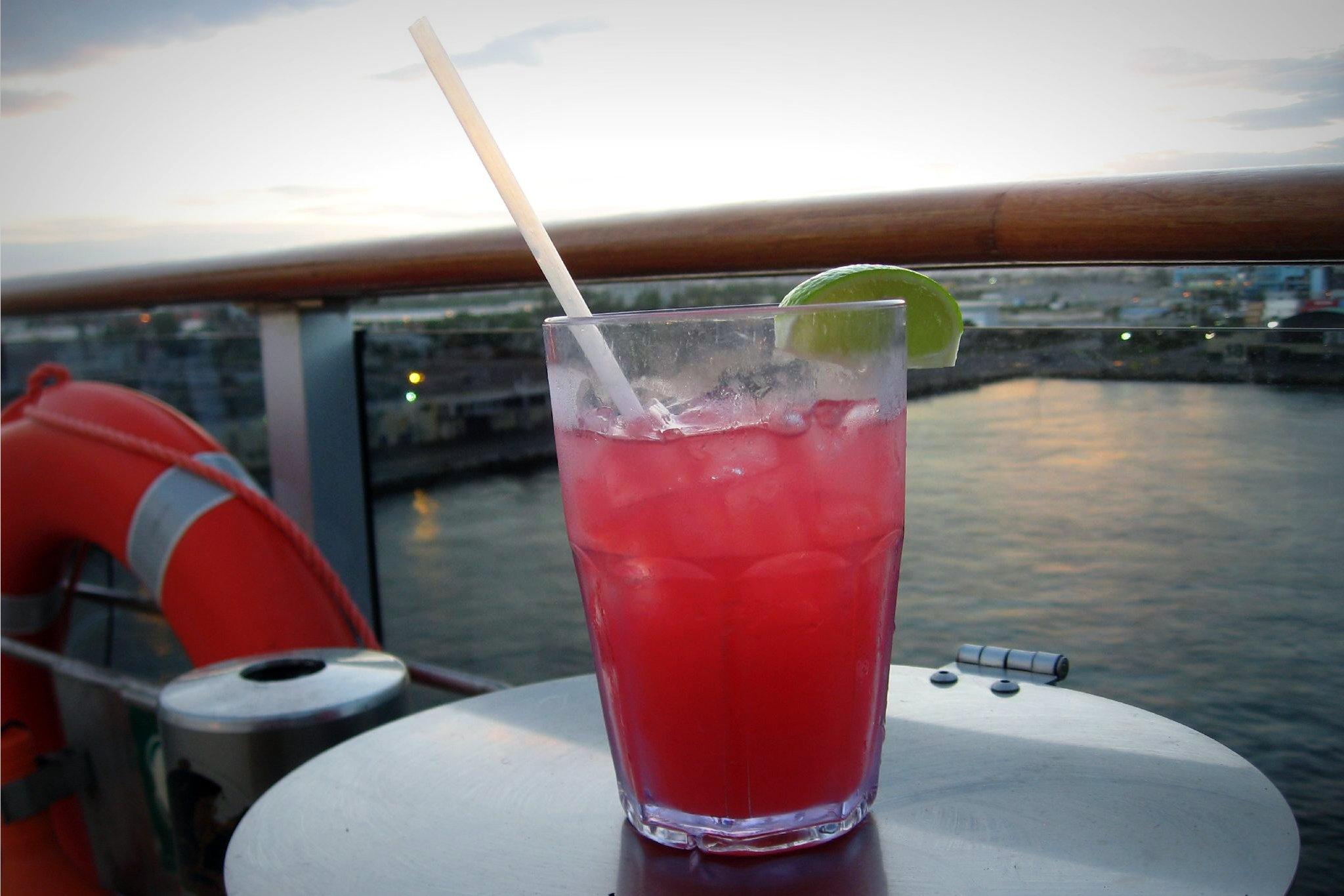
- Sea breeze
- Type: Mixed drink
- Ingredients: 4 cl Vodka; 12 cl Cranberry juice; 3 cl Grapefruit juice
- Base spirit: Vodka
- Standard drinkware: Highball glass
- Standard garnish: lime slice
- Served: On the rocks: poured over ice
- Preparation: Build all ingredients in a highball glass filled with ice. Garnish with lime wedge.

A sea breeze is a cocktail containing vodka with cranberry juice and grapefruit juice. The cocktail is usually consumed during summer months. The drink may be shaken in order to create a foamy surface. It is considered an IBA Official Cocktail.

The drink follows the classic cocktail principle of balancing strong (alcohol) with weak (fruit juice) and sweet and sour.

A bay breeze, or a Hawaiian sea breeze, is similar to a sea breeze except for the substitution of pineapple juice for grapefruit juice. It is also closely related to the Cape Codder (which lacks the grapefruit juice) and the Salty Dog (which lacks the cranberry juice and is made with a salted rim).

== History ==
The cocktail was born in the late 1920s, but the recipe was different from the one used today, as gin and grenadine were used in the original sea breeze. This was near the end of the Prohibition era. In the 1930s, a sea breeze had gin, apricot brandy, grenadine, and lemon juice. Later, a Sea Breeze recipe would contain vodka, dry vermouth, Galliano, and blue Curaçao.

In the 1930s, a cranberry growers' cooperative evolved into Ocean Spray, which promoted cranberry juice as a mixer with alcohol, first with gin and later with vodka. Ocean Spray created the Red Devil, later called the harpoon or Cape Codder, in 1945, and its descendants such as the greyhound, the salty dog, the bay breeze, and the sea breeze were later created. Starting in the 1960s, the breeze drinks were sporadically in the top ten most popular mixed drinks.

According to some, the sea breeze, along with the Cape Codder and bay breeze, did not become very popular until the 1970s. This was because in 1959, the U.S. Department of Health stated that cranberry crops were tainted with toxic herbicides, collapsing the cranberry industry.

== See also ==
- List of cocktails
