= Edward Gelsthorpe =

American marketing executive

- Born: Edward Gelsthorpe; June 14, 1921; Philadelphia
- Died: September 12, 2009 (aged 88); East Dennis, Massachusetts
- Occupation: Marketing executive

Edward Gelsthorpe (June 14, 1921 – September 12, 2009) was an American marketing executive. He used his creative skills to build markets for new products such as Ban roll-on deodorant at Bristol-Myers, Cran-Apple juice for the Ocean Spray cooperative, and Manwich canned sloppy joe sauce for Hunt-Wesson.

== Early life and career ==
Gelsthorpe was born on June 14, 1921, in Philadelphia. He was raised in Winchester, Massachusetts, and in Pleasantville, New York. His tuition for Hamilton College was covered by a wealthy relative who expected him to become a clergyman, but the advent of World War II led Gelsthorpe to enlist in the United States Navy in 1942 following his graduation with a degree in philosophy and English literature. He served in the Pacific Theater of Operations on a destroyer escort. During action in the Mariana Islands, Gelsthorpe was awarded service stars for his efforts to protect fellow soldiers who were being attacked by Japanese troops; he left the Navy as a lieutenant.

== Marketing ==
After a number of unrelated positions after the completion of his military service, Gelsthorpe was hired as a salesman by Bristol-Myers. He became director of specialty sales, and was named as director of sales promotion in the firm's product division in June 1954. He bought on the spot the rights to a design offered to him by an amateur inventor that would apply deodorant using a roll-on ball similar to the way ink is applied to paper by a ballpoint pen, leading to the introduction of Ban in 1955; it became one of the firm's best-selling products. In April 1958, he was promoted to vice president and general sales manager. In his 13 years with the firm, he ascended the corporate ladder to become vice president and director for marketing.

He was hired by Liebman Breweries, the makers of Rheingold Beer, in February 1961, as vice president for marketing. That spot was short-lived, and he was hired by Colgate-Palmolive in September 1961 as vice president and sales manager of its toiletries division.

Ocean Spray hired him in 1963 as its chief executive. To that time, the company had only sold processed cranberries in juice and sauce form. Largely selling a seasonal product, consumed at Thanksgiving and Christmas, the cooperative had been facing declining sales that resulted from warnings issued in the late 1950s about potentially cancer-causing chemicals sprayed on the cranberries. Working together with Sylvia Schur of Creative Food Services, Gelsthorpe was able to oversee the development of several brand extensions, including its blockbuster Cranapple and other fresh and frozen fruit juice mixes, as well as a cranberry-orange relish. Sales doubled with these new products as well as efforts to promote the use of cranberry juice in mixed drinks, all leading to his nickname of "Cranapple Ed".

Gelsthorpe was hired by Hunt-Wesson in 1968 as its CEO and president. He oversaw the expansion of the company's narrow product variety with the introduction of single serving Snack Pack shelf-stable puddings, Manwich sloppy joe sauce, and Skillet Dinners. To accelerate the expansion of the firm's product line, Gelsthorpe often pushed for products to begin distribution before all market research had been completed.

He was hired by Gillette in September 1972 as its president and vice-chairman of marketing. There, his fast-paced approach and outsider status did not fit with the corporate culture that was present. He left after 18 months at the helm, replaced by Colman Mockler, a 17-year veteran of the firm who came to the post with a financial background. This was followed by a position as executive vice president and chief operating officer at United Brands, which also proved to be a brief stint, with Gelsthorpe leaving in September 1975 after being passed over for promotion to president four months earlier. He had some more success at H.P. Hood Inc., developing Frogurt, the first frozen yogurt marketed nationally in the U.S., and helped the regional company develop a national profile.

== Death ==
A resident of East Dennis, Massachusetts, Gelsthorpe died at age 88 at his home there on September 12, 2009. He was survived by his wife, the former Mary Ann MacLaughlin, whom he had met in high school and married in 1943, as well as by a daughter, three sons, and four grandchildren.
