= Mr. Boston Official Bartender's Guide =

- First edition, published in 1935
- Original title: Old Mr. Boston Official Bartender's Guide
- Language: English
- Subject: Bartending
- Publication date: 1935 (first edition)
- Publication place: United States
- Media type: Print
- Dewey Decimal: 641.874
- Website: mrbostondrinks.com

Mr. Boston Official Bartender's Guide is a cocktail recipe book and bartending manual first published in 1935. The guide was once used on nearly every bar shelf in the United States. About 11 million copies were printed in 68 editions, as of 2015.

== Attributes ==
Before the internet, the book helped play a role in bars across the United States in the creation of unfamiliar cocktails; bartenders would look up recipes in a printed bartender's guide, oftentimes the Mr. Boston Official Bartender's Guide, and not know anything beyond that recipe. In the modern day, bartenders can find a plethora of recipes, the drink's history, who is known for drinking it, and other details, helping spur the cocktail renaissance.

The book serves as a historical document – it featured popular new recipes in each edition, making each book represent what the public was drinking at the time.

About 11 million copies have been printed in 68 editions, as of 2015.

The book is recognizable for maintaining its branding across the decades, including a cherry-red cover, a small size, and a logo of "Old Mr. Boston", a man with a top hat and muttonchops, with an easy-going grin and stout stature.

== History ==
The Mr. Boston Official Bartender's Guide was first published by the Ben-Burk Inc., owners and operators of a distillery producing Mr. Boston-branded liquors. The company was founded in 1927, during Prohibition, and began distilling in 1933, around the time of Prohibition's repeal.

The book was first published with 120 recipes, including for "cocktails, fizzes, punches, highballs, toddies, and long drinks." The book sold for 50 U.S. cents. The book became one of many cocktail guides released as early as the 1940s, though its marketing helped it thrive: signature elements including its logo, red cover, and size. The book was edited by Leo Cotton from 1935 until his retirement in 1970, spanning 49 editions. Cotton made sure the book was up-to-date with modern recipes.

Coinciding with Cotton's retirement, the bar industry began to decline into a "dark age". The book remained to be published, though it included low-brow drinks such as the Fuzzy Navel and the Slippery Nipple. In the late 1990s, the cocktail renaissance took place, and bars began to reconsider techniques and recipe creations. The book was then updated, the "Old" was dropped from the book's name, and the company hired notable bartenders to improve the work. These included Jim Meehan, co-founder of Please Don't Tell, Jonathan Pogash, and wine and spirits writer Anthony Giglio. These writers added hundreds of new recipes, expanded the introduction, and redid the chapter sections. By 2015, the latest guide had 336 pages, up from 150 in 1963 and 40 in the 1935 original.

In 2012, an anniversary edition was published by John Wiley & Sons.

In July 2016, Mr. Boston launched its new website, mrbostondrinks.com, where thirteen of the Official Bartender's Guides are available in digital form. It contains about 1,500 cocktail recipes.

The Mr. Boston guides remain recommended into 2019; a writer for The Kitchn advised using a modern copy for reference in home bars, and older editions to rediscover forgotten cocktails.
