= Cran-Apple juice =

Juice blend marketed by the Ocean Spray cooperative

Cran-apple juice (trademark registered as Cranapple) is a blend of cranberry juice and apple juice marketed by the Ocean Spray cooperative, styled as Cran•Apple. The juice blend is marketed as combining the tartness of cranberry with the sweetness of the apple. Until 1963, when the product was first developed, cranberries were sold in the form of cranberry juice and cranberry sauce primarily around Thanksgiving and Christmas time. The Cranapple blend helped turn the cranberry into a year-round product. Cranapple started a trend and was followed by other juice blends.

Marketing executive Edward Gelsthorpe was hired by the company in 1963, having worked in the marketing and product development areas at Bristol-Myers. Gelsthorpe's focus was to expand the company's product base, recognizing that there was no way to convince people to "eat cranberry sauce every time you have chicken", no matter how much money was spent on advertising. The company was struggling with a seasonal product and had been hit by consumer fears after a 1959 government warning that chemicals sprayed on the cranberries could cause cancer. Working together with food editor Sylvia Schur of Creative Food Services, he oversaw the development of the Cran-Apple blend that would balance the tart and sweet tastes of the respective juices.

The product was successful and gave Ocean Spray a product that could be sold year round. Throughout his career, Gelsthorpe would carry the nickname "Cranapple Ed".
