= Golden Elk =

Shooter drink

- Ingredients: 2 parts Jägermeister; 1 part Goldschläger
- Base spirit: Jägermeister, Goldschläger
- Standard drinkware: Shot glass

A Golden Elk is a shooter that is made with two parts Jägermeister and one part Goldschläger. It has also been called a "Starry Night" or "24 Karat Nightmare".

The name Golden Elk is derived from the gold in Goldschläger and the image of the stag that appears on bottles of Jägermeister.

A Liquid Cocaine is a shooter that is a variation of the Golden Elk. It is made with one part Jägermeister, one part Goldschläger and one part Bacardi 151. It may be shaken with ice, or not.
