= Tequesso =

Type of shot

A Tequesso is a type of shot wherein a shot of tequila gold is chased by a shot of espresso. The coffee works to neutralize the bitterness of the tequila and the burn of the alcohol, while the caramel of the tequila sweetens the coffee. The Tequesso is sometimes referred to as Esprilla. The drink is often seen as a digestive to avoid an after dinner dip.

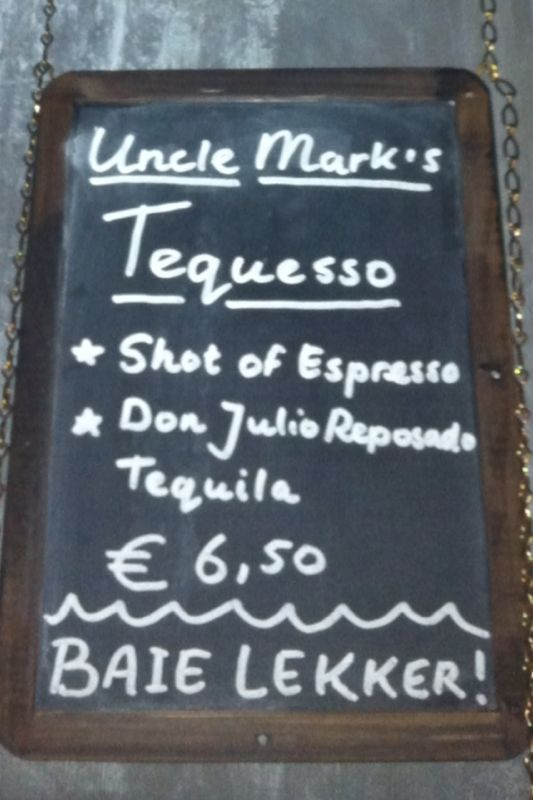
Tequesso sign outside Mr. Mofongo Distillery, Groningen, Netherlands

== History ==
Similarities with the Mexican coffee are apparent, though the sequentiality of the drink has taken it away from the typical dinner table.

While the official origins of a Tequesso are unknown, it is said that the term was first introduced at the Branderij Groningen.

The drink, as described, has since become a common pick-me-up in many Dutch bars and restaurants. It also has been said that the "Patron XO cafe" recipe, has been based on Tequesso

The Tequesso has since spread from Europe to the rest of the world, with many elite bars now offering Tequesso on their menu. Varieties are present, with the Patio at 54 Main in Westhampton serving it as a dessert drink with adding simple syrup.

Tequesso was registered as a trademark by Joris van Niel in 2019, suggesting a serious commercialization effort might be in the making

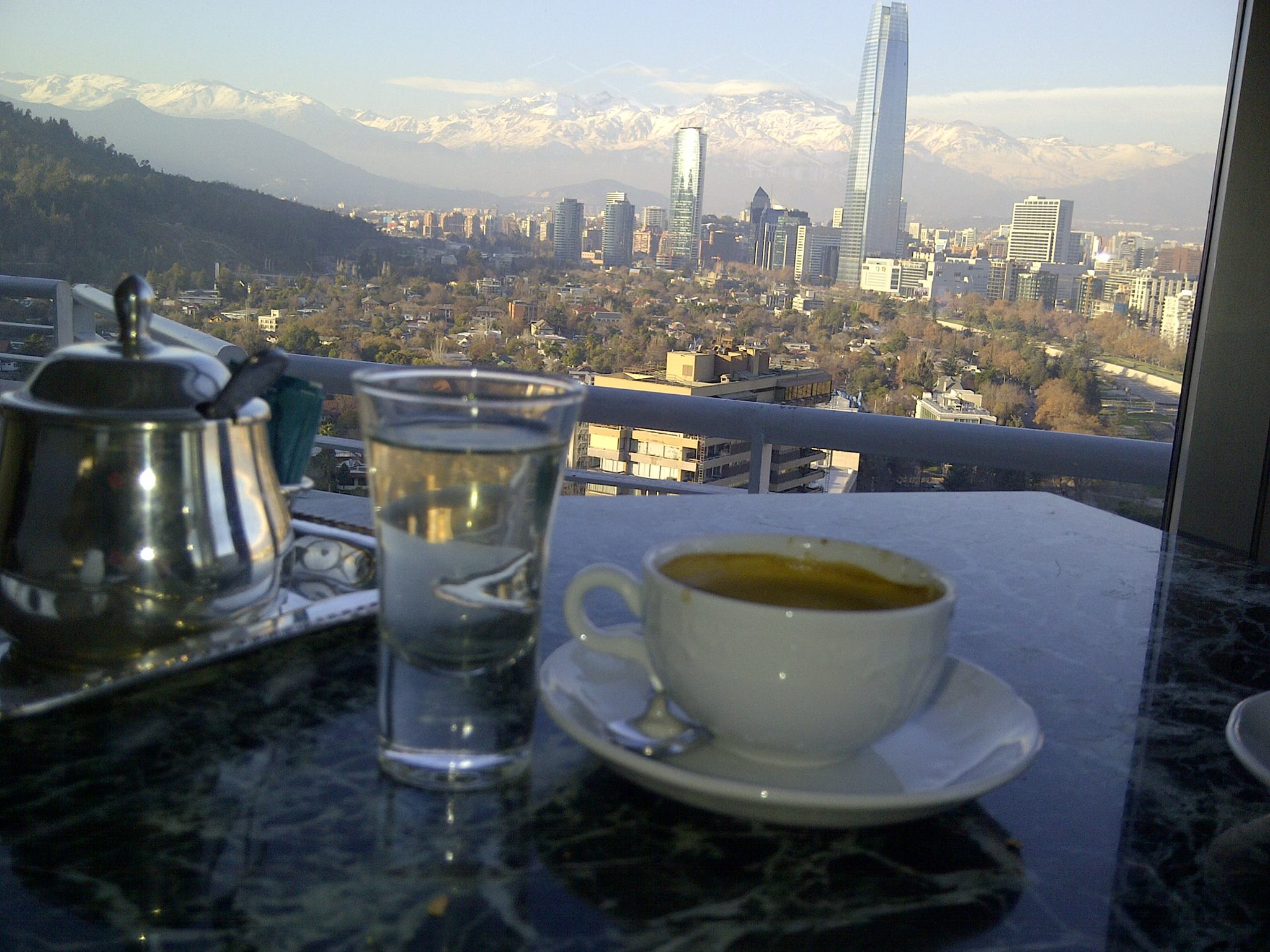
A Tequesso served at the skybar of the Cristobal Tower Hotel in Santiago
