= Slippery nipple =

Layered cocktail shooter

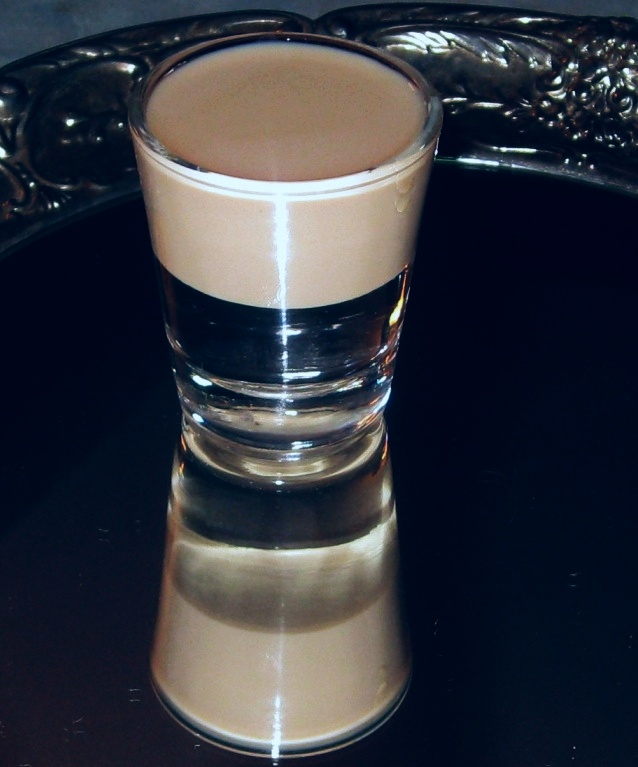
- A slippery nipple shooter
- Type: Layered shooter
- Ingredients: (1 part) Sambuca; (1 part) Baileys Irish Cream
- Base spirit: Sambuca, Irish cream
- Standard drinkware: Shot glass
- Standard garnish: Cherry (optional)
- Served: Neat: undiluted and without ice
- Preparation: Pour the sambuca into a shot glass, then pour the Irish Cream on top so that the two liquids do not mix.

The slippery nipple is a layered cocktail shooter most commonly composed of Baileys Irish Cream and sambuca. When prepared properly, the ingredients remain in two distinct visible layers due to the relative densities of the ingredients.

== History ==
The slippery nipple, along with the fuzzy navel, silk panties, and teeny weeny woo woo, was criticized by New York Times writer William Grimes when describing the rise of such schnapps-containing cocktails as "a kind of cult, rallying points for young drinkers in search of fun and not too picky about taste".

== Preparation ==
The drink is made from 1/2 oz. sambuca, 1/2 oz. Irish cream liqueur, and optionally, a drop of grenadine or a cherry. Some versions of the drink replace the sambuca with equal parts of anisette and peppermint schnapps.

== Variations ==
Replacing sambuca with butterscotch schnapps yields the buttery nipple cocktail shooter.

== Sources ==
- Rathbun, A. J. (2007-09-12). Good Spirits: Recipes, Revelations, Refreshments, and Romance, Shaken and Served with a Twist. Houghton Mifflin Harcourt. ISBN 978-1-55832-336-0.
