= Beer mix =

Beverage containing beer and other liquid ingredients

A beer mix usually refers to an alcoholic beverage with beer and one or more additional ingredients, typically containing 40 to 70% beer, marketed primarily to young adults. Popular mixers include cola, lemon, and other fruit juices.

Beer mixes are an established part of German drinking culture and are available in a wide range of flavors and varieties, including non-alcoholic versions.

== History ==
Beer mixes have been available in Germany since early 20th century. The “Radler" beer mix, which is still popular today, is seen as the pioneer of the market. The drink originated from the summer of 1922, when a Munich inn was so busy with cyclists that there was the threat of a beer shortage. In order to stretch the remaining beer supply, lemonade was added, creating the Radler. Further variants followed, e.g., cola-beer and wheat beer mixes. Up until 1993, it was only permitted to sell freshly prepared beer mixes due to legal requirements.

In 1995, the mid-sized German Karlsberg Brewery in Homburg (Saar) was the first brewery to use an amendment to the beer tax law which enabled the production and sale of ready-mixed beer mixes in bottles or tins. "MiXery Beer + Cola + X” was therefore one of the first ready-mixed cola and beer drinks. This innovation was initially met with considerable criticism from the beer industry, but the first competitors appeared on the market in 2001 and the market subsequently saw a continuous increase in sales volume.

Further variants, which differed in the type of beer they contained as base, followed. Schöfferhofer Grapefruit is a pioneer in the wheat beer mixes and was launched on the market in 2007 by the Binding Brauerei Brewery.

A further variant and innovation in the beer mix market followed in 2014 with the introduction of so-called "MiXery Beer-Cocktails" by the Karlsberg Brewery. These are available in the varieties Caipirinha, Mojito and Sex on the Beach.

Alongside the alcoholic beer mix segment which accounts for the majority of the market, the non-alcoholic sector is also increasing; a growing number of alcohol-free beer mix products are also available.

The current leader of the German alcoholic beer mix market is still the MiXery brand with "MiXery Beer + Cola + X" followed by Krombacher Radler, Oettinger Radler, Beck’s Green Lemon, Schöfferhofer Grapefruit and MiXery Nastrov Flavour iced blue. Krombacher is the non-alcoholic beer mix leader.

== Top 40 beer mix brands in German retail ==
Descending according to turnover.

Alcoholic	Non-alcoholic
1. MiXery	1. Krombacher
2. Oettinger	2. Bitburger
3. Veltins	3. Paulaner
4. Beck's	4. Gründel's
5. Krombacher	5. Clausthaler
6. Schöfferhofer	6. Oettinger
7. Bitburger	7. Warsteiner
8. Desperados	8. Sternquell
9. Mönchshof	9. Beck's
10. Warsteiner	10. Karamalz
11. Sternburg	11. Fürstenberg
12. Licher	12. Tucher
13. Lausitzer	13. Licher
14. Meisterbräu	Veltins
15. Hacker Pschorr	15. Hoepfner
16. Lübzer	16. Welde
17. 2.5 Original	17. Lübzer
18. Löschzwerg	18. Pyraser
19. Berliner Kindl	19. Altenauer
20. Höpfner	20. Bruch
21. Hasseröder	21. Herforder
22. Cab	22. Taubertaler
23. Wernesgrüner	23. Pfundstädter
24. Bibop	24. Pott's
25. Hochdorfer	25. Sanwald
26. Salitos	26. Holsten
27. Rothaus	27. Fiege
28. Paulaner	28. Bellheimer
29. Gessner	29. Distelhäuser
30. Karlsberg	30. Feldschlösschen
31. Leikeim	31. Iserlohner
32. Astra	32. Valentins
33. Schlappeseppel	33. Neuzeller Klosterbräu
34. Flensburger	34. Huber
35. Paderborner	35. Unertl
36. Löwenbraeu	36. Kirner
37. Haake Beck	37. Hachenburger
38. Fiege	38. Apoldär
39. Henninger	39. Hatz
40. Fürstenberg	40. Fürstenberg

== See also ==
- Beer cocktail
- Bierlikör
