= Goldwasser =

Liqueur originally from Gdańsk

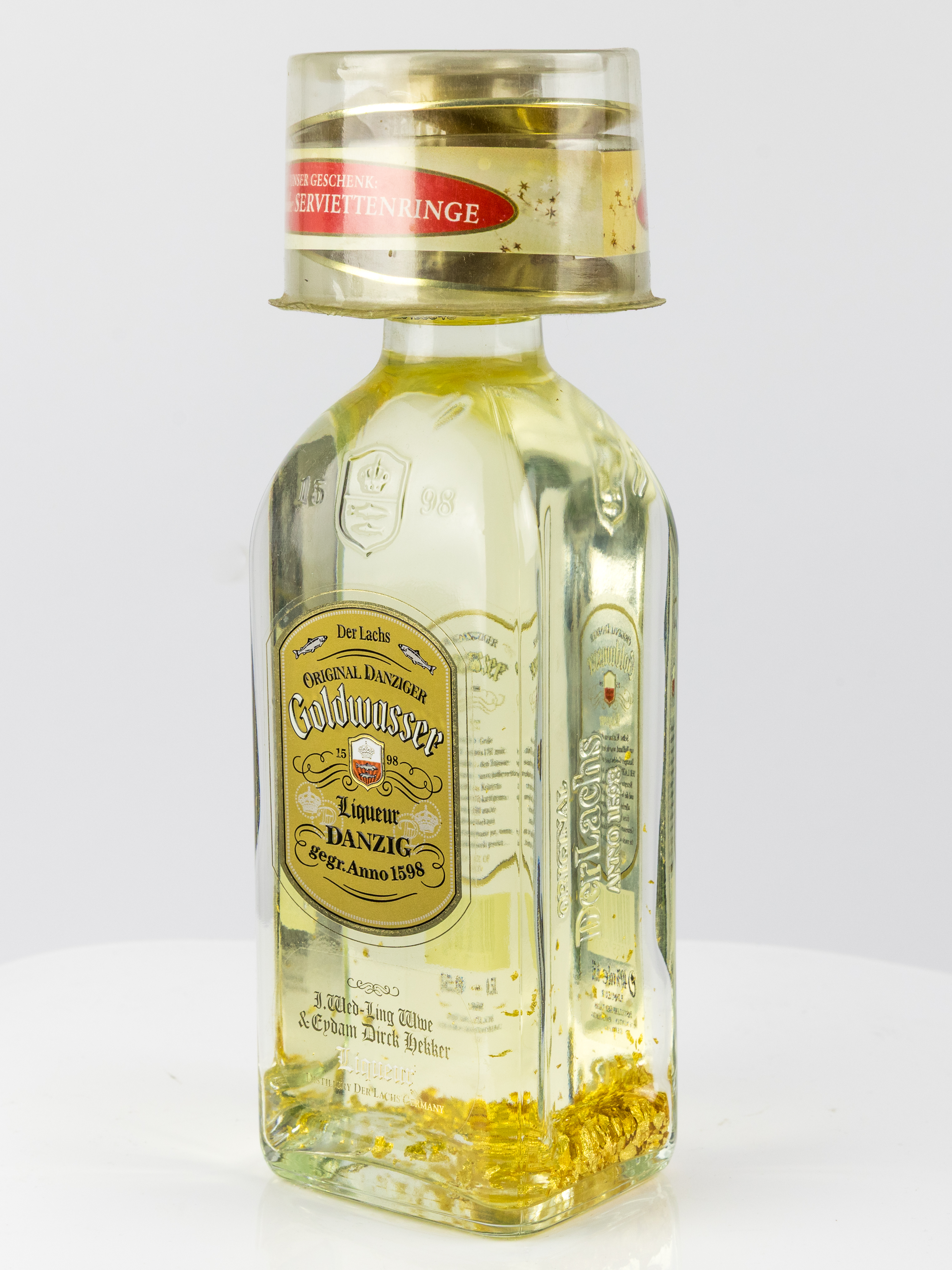
Goldwasser

Goldwasser (Also Danziger Goldwasser, lit. 'Gold water from Danzig'. Polish: Wódka Gdańska; Kashubian: Wòdka Gduńska, with Goldwasser as the registered tradename.) is a traditional root and herbal liqueur from Central Europe. The signature characteristic of the drink is the suspension of small decorative flakes of 23 karat gold. The beverage itself has a strong 40% alcohol by volume and is flavoured with herbs and spices such as cardamom, cloves, cinnamon, lavender, thyme, coriander and juniper, with a syrupy texture. Goldwasser was produced from 1598 to 2009 in Gdańsk (German: Danzig). Production now takes place in Germany.

== Gold content ==
Alcoholic solutions were used by artists for gilding, which is believed to be the inspiration for the drink. Alchemy, which was at its high point in the late 16th century when Goldwasser appeared, held gold to have many desirable medical properties; while modern medicine disputes this, native gold is known to be non-toxic to humans and to pass through the digestive tract unchanged, unlike most other heavy metals. Since the flakes are extremely small and thin, the price is not prohibitive. When used as a food additive, gold is labelled as E175; see List of food additives, Codex Alimentarius.

== History ==
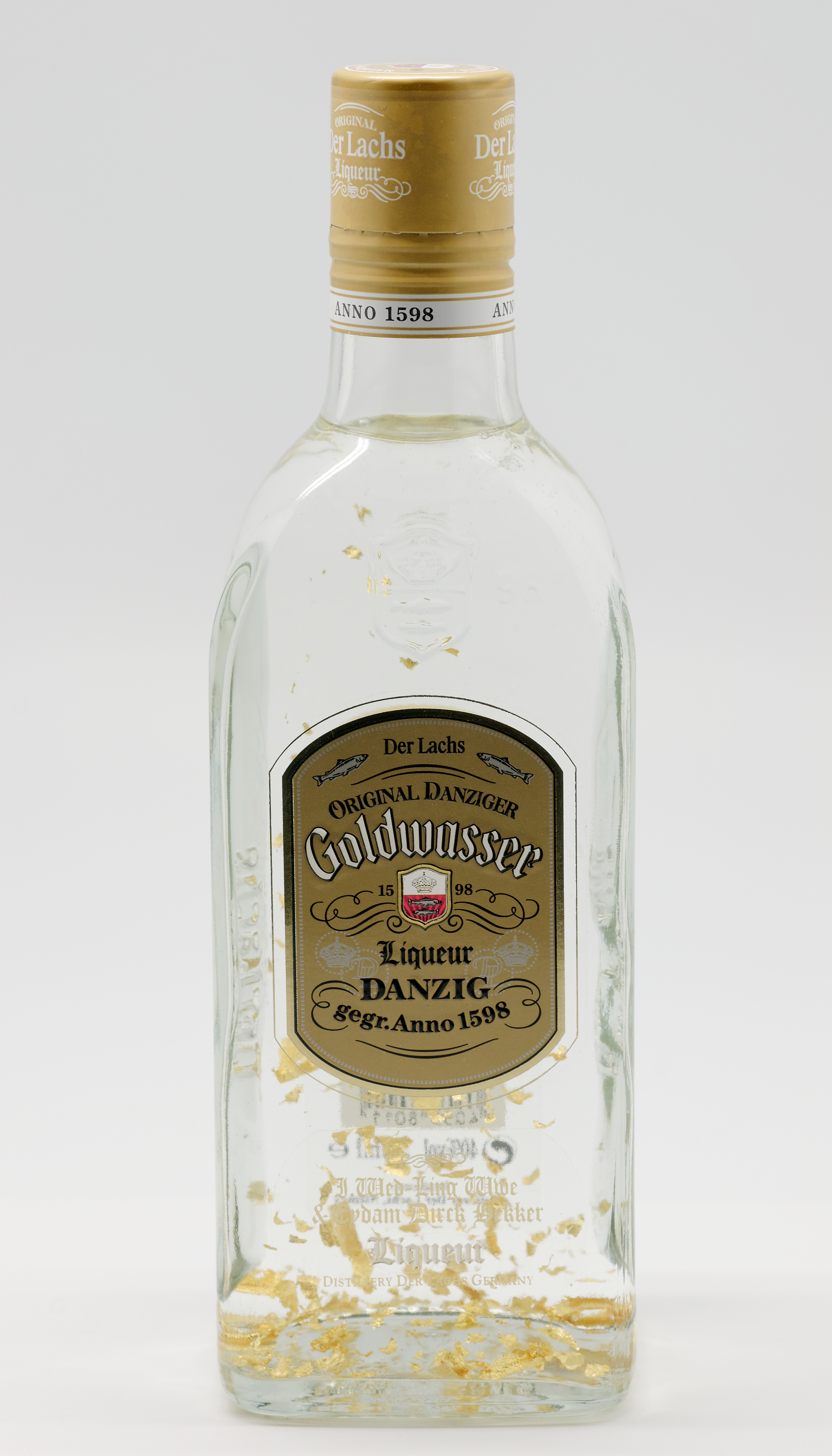
Original "Danziger Goldwasser Liqueur" by "Der Lachs Co." with visible gold leaf

The drink was invented by a Dutchman from De Lier, Ambrosius Vermeulen, who moved to Danzig and became a citizen of Danzig on 6 July 1598. In 1704 Ambrosius' grandson Salomon Vermöllen and his brother-in-law Isaac Wed-Ling moved production to new premises located in the Breitgasse. At that time it was common for houses to use animal symbols instead of numbers, and the new factory featured a salmon (German: Lachs) on the façade; hence the naming of the brand "Der Lachs zu Danzig".

During his trip to Western Europe — the so-called Grand Embassy — Russian Tsar Peter I the Great visited the city of Danzig. He founded the official Russian consulate in Danzig and became a great lover of Goldwasser. He ordered permanent delivery of Goldwasser to Russia for himself.

As the Free City of Danzig was separated from Germany after World War I by the Polish corridor, the Der Lachs company opened in 1922 an additional factory in Berlin to supply the main part of Germany and international markets with their products Goldwasser and Krambambuli from there. After 1945, when the city became part of Poland, only the Berlin factory continued to produce genuine Danziger Goldwasser. In 1971 Der Lachs was taken over by the Hardenberg-Wilthen distillery and production was moved to the town of Nörten-Hardenberg in West Germany.

Wódka Gdańska is mentioned by the Polish-Lithuanian poet Adam Mickiewicz as a drink popular with the Polish nobility.

Legend has it that when King of Poland Sigismund II Augustus visited Danzig in 1549 after his coronation, part of the city's homage to the monarch was a gift of Goldwasser, and he is said to have sung the praises of the golden drink often along the rest of his tour.

Goldwasser is used to flavour Soufflé Rothschild.

== Modern production ==
It is possible to buy the original brand of Goldwasser in the old town of Gdańsk. The original Goldwasser distillery building, though not operational, has been rebuilt as it was before the war, and is now home to the exclusive restaurant "Pod Łososiem" (The Salmon).

Various Polish brands from Gdańsk sell similar drinks called Gdańska Złotówka (Gdańsk gold) or Złota Woda (Gold water).

Another brand of Goldwasser, Schwabacher Goldwasser, and other sorts of food embellished with gold, are produced in the city of Schwabach near Nuremberg. Goldschläger is a Swiss cinnamon schnapps which also contains small flakes of 22 karat gold.
