= Fuzzy navel =

Alcoholic mixed drink

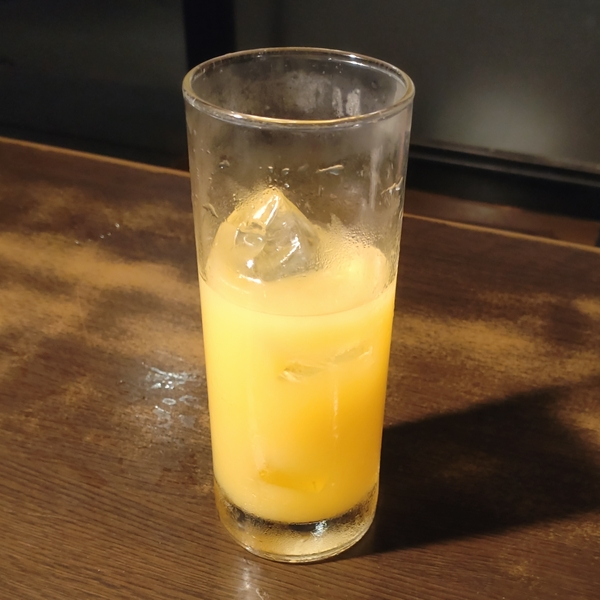
A fuzzy navel

A fuzzy navel is a mixed drink made from peach schnapps and orange juice. Generally an equal amount of each component is used to concoct it, although quantities may vary. It can also be made with lemonade or a splash of vodka depending on the drinker's taste. The addition of another 1 or 1 1/2 oz of vodka to the fuzzy navel creates a "hairy navel", the more "hair" referring to the increased strength of alcohol in the drink. A "Hairy Navel" or "Fuzzy Russian" recipe may include 1 part vodka, 1 part peach schnapps, and 4 parts orange juice.

== History ==
In 1984, National Distillers launched DeKuyper Original Peachtree, the first peach-flavored schnapps sold in the United States. Inspired by the Screwdriver (vodka and orange juice), Peachtree and orange juice was quickly popularized across the country, particularly among women seeking a sweeter, low-calorie vodka alternative. By 1985, Peachtree was the top-selling schnapps brand in the U.S.

As part of a wider marketing campaign, National Distillers worked with an advertising agency to create names for DeKuyper schnapps drink recipes, eventually landing on "Fuzzy Navel" for the popular Peachtree and orange juice combination.

The prominence of mixed drinks incorporating schnapps during the 1980s, including the Fuzzy Navel, the Slippery Nipple, and the Teeny Weeny Woo Woo, was described by New York Times critic William Grimes as "a kind of cult, rallying points for young drinkers in search of fun and not too picky about taste".

== Name ==
A Fuzzy Navel is sometimes called a "Cold Medina," a popular nickname started by the Beastie Boys. Flavor Flav, who worked for the same record label as them at the time, would use Cold Medina or Funky Cold Medina as an affirmation.

== See also ==
- Sex on the Beach
