= Bay breeze (cocktail) =

Vodka cocktail

The bay breeze is a cocktail which has a Cape Codder as its base, with the addition of pineapple juice. The drink is also sometimes called a downeaster, Hawaiian sea breeze, or a Paul Joseph. This cocktail is similar to the sea breeze, an IBA Official Cocktail with grapefruit juice (rather than pineapple).

== Ingredients ==
The following ingredients are based on the IBA measures for a Sea Breeze when issued in parts.

- 2 parts vodka
- 6 parts cranberry juice
- 1.5 part pineapple juice

Build all ingredients in a highball glass filled with ice. Garnish with lime wedge.

== See also ==
- Sea breeze (cocktail)
- List of cocktails
