= Sex on the beach =

Cocktail mainly composed of vodka

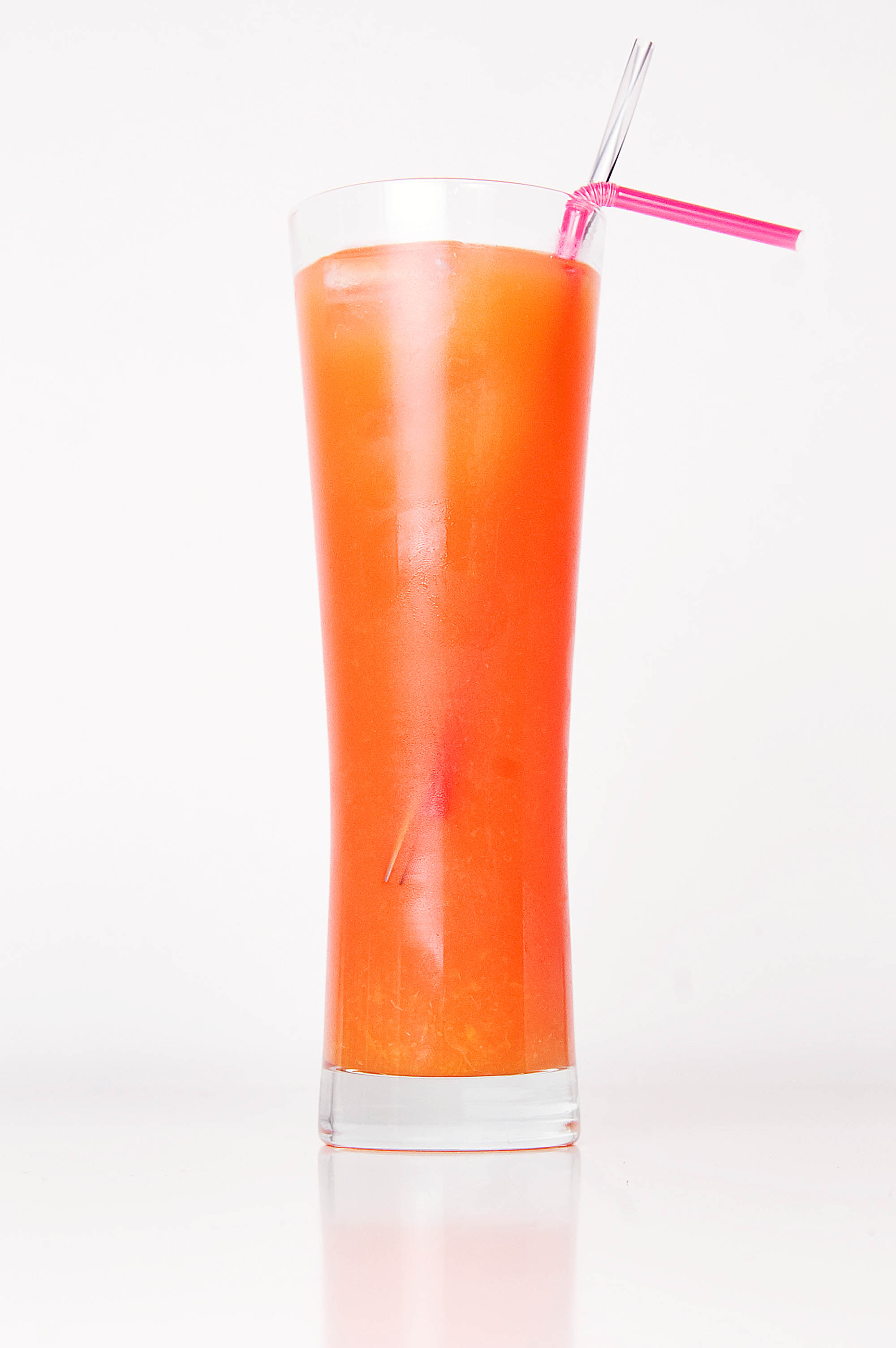
- Sex on the beach
- Type: Cocktail
- Ingredients: 4 cl Vodka; 2 cl Peach schnapps; 4 cl Orange juice; 4 cl Cranberry juice
- Base spirit: Vodka
- Standard drinkware: Highball glass
- Standard garnish: Orange slice
- Served: On the rocks: poured over ice
- Preparation: Build all ingredients in a highball glass filled with ice. Garnish with orange slice.

A sex on the beach is an alcoholic cocktail containing vodka, peach schnapps, orange juice and cranberry juice. It is an International Bartenders Association Official Cocktail.

== General types ==
There are two general types of the cocktail:

- The IBA official cocktail is made from vodka, peach schnapps, orange juice, and cranberry juice.
- The 2008 Mr. Boston Official Bartender's Guide (67th edition) provides an alternative recipe made from vodka, Chambord, Midori Melon Liqueur, pineapple juice, and cranberry juice.

The drink is built over ice in a highball glass and garnished with an orange slice. Sometimes they are mixed in smaller amounts and served as a shooter.

== Variations ==
Some derivative variations have their own names:

- A "sex in the driveway" is a sex on the beach with orange juice and cranberry juice replaced with blue curaçao and Sprite.
- A "woo woo" is a sex on the beach without orange juice.
- The alcohol-free variation is sometimes referred to as "safe sex on the beach", "cuddles on the beach", or "virgin(s) on the beach".
