= Pickleback =

Alcohol drink involving pickle brine

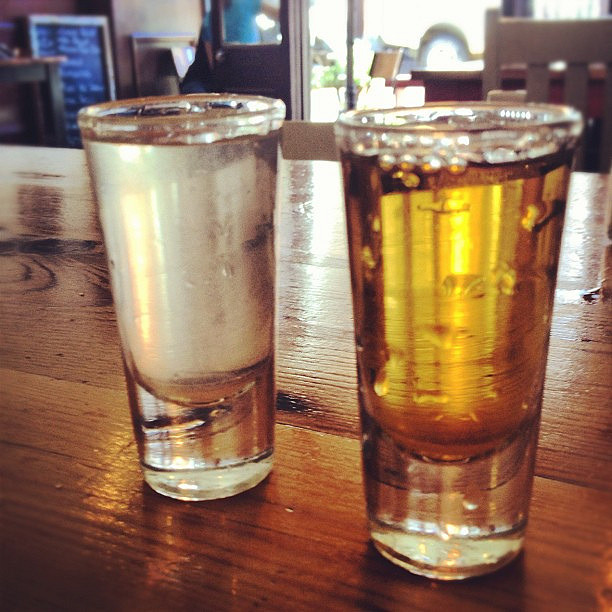
A pickleback

A pickleback is a type of shot wherein a shot of liquor is chased by a shot of pickle brine; the term "pickleback" may also refer only to the shot of pickle brine itself. Alternatively, the shot can be chased by a bite of a pickle (generally, a whole dill pickle). The pickle brine works to neutralize both the taste of the liquor and the burn of the alcohol.

British visitors returning to the United Kingdom from New York City introduced the recipe to bars in both London (as early as 2011), and Devon. In 2012, UK bartender Byron Knight created a bottled pickleback using his own homegrown dill pickles and a flavour profile of ginger, mustard seeds, dill, garlic and dark sugar.

The drink has also spread to Canada, Shanghai, Belfast, New Zealand, and South Australia.
