= Tequila slammer =

Cocktail made with tequila and lemon-lime soda or ginger ale

- Type: Mixed drink shooter/drink shot
- Ingredients: One part tequila; One part 7 Up, ginger ale, Sprite, or Mountain Dew
- Base spirit: Tequila
- Standard drinkware: Rocks glass
- Served: Straight up: chilled, without ice
- Preparation: Mix carefully to avoid releasing the dissolved CO_{2}.

A tequila slammer (known in Mexico as a muppet or mópet) is a cocktail served in a rocks glass. It is made with tequila and a highly-carbonated lemon-lime flavored soda or ginger ale.

== Method ==
The drink gets its name from the way it is commonly consumed; the usual procedure is to leave about a fifth of the glass empty to allow the drink to fizz, then to hold one's hand over the top of the glass and then slam it onto a hard surface to mix it. The slamming action releases gas bubbles from the mixed drink causing it to foam vigorously. It will then quickly escape the glass if not imbibed immediately, the result (and intention) of which is swift intoxication.

It can also be served with equal parts tequila, white wine (or champagne), and lemonade, creating a more potent, flavorsome mix.

A Mexican variant known as the "tequila boom-boom" uses tequila, 7-Up (or Sprite), and grenadine syrup.

== In media ==
One of the first (or certainly most noteworthy) appearances of the tequila slammer is Elvis Presley demonstrating the technique in the 1963 film Fun in Acapulco.

The favorite drink of the protagonist – Inspector "Tequila" Yuen – in John Woo's 1992 film Hard Boiled, played by Chow Yun-fat, is a tequila slammer. "Tequila", however, makes his out of Schweppes soda water.

Featured prominently in Jean-Jacques Beineix's 1986 film Betty Blue, but referred to by its alternate name Tequila Rapido.

In the 1993 film Aspen Extreme, Dexter Rutecki says to the bartender "do you know how to make a Tequila Slammer?" who responds, "I've been to high school, yes"

== See also ==
- List of cocktails
