= Shot (drink) =

Small serving of alcohol

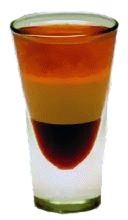
A B-52 shot served in a shot glass

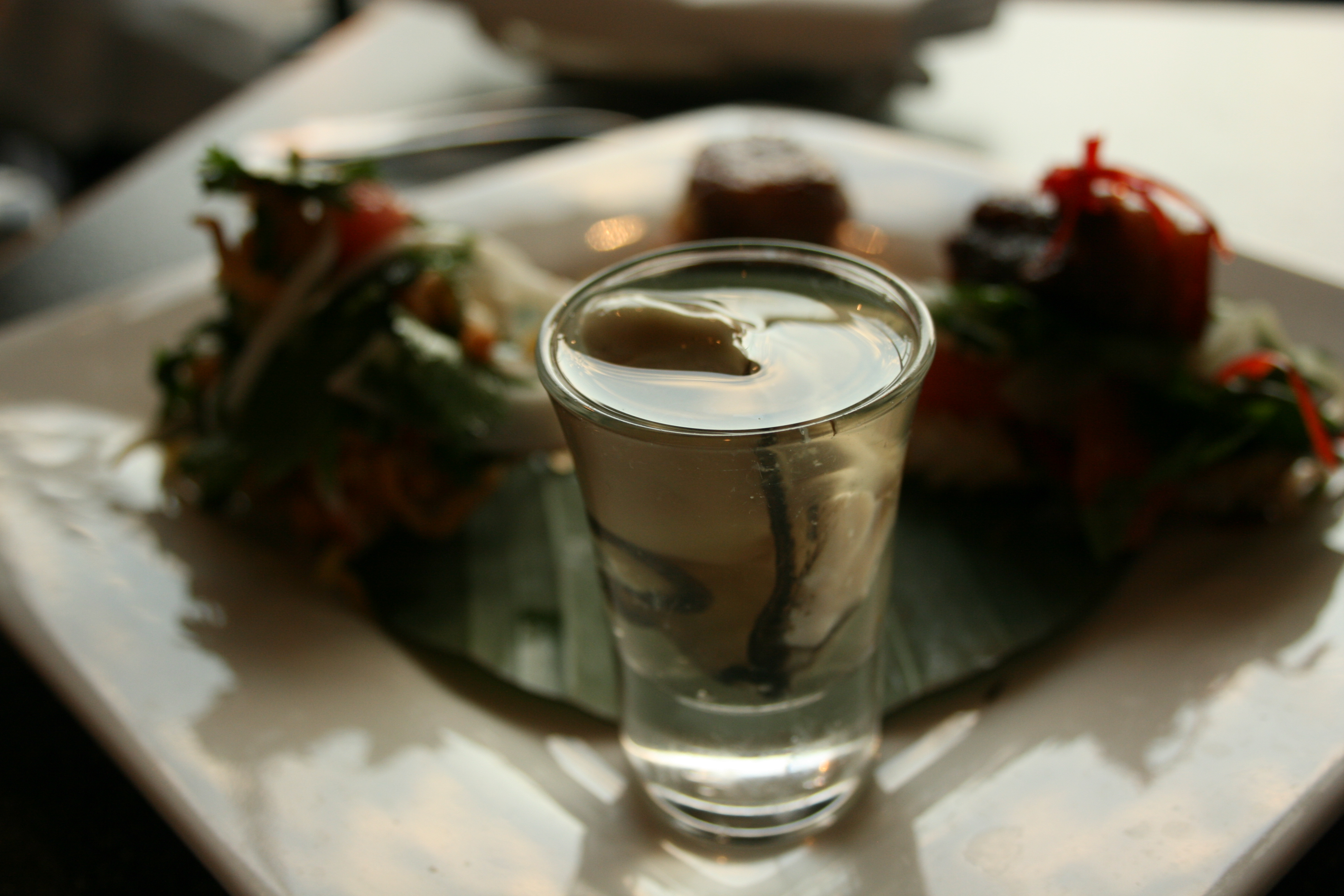
A sake oyster shot

A shot (sometimes shooter) is a small serving of spirits or a mixed drink (usually about 1.0–1.5 US fluid ounces or 30–44 millilitres), typically consumed quickly, often in a single swallow. It is common to serve a shot as a side to a larger drink.

Shots can be shaken, stirred, blended, layered, or simply poured. Shot glasses or sherry glasses are the usual drinkware in which shots are served. They are most commonly served at bars, and some bartenders have their own signature shot.

The ingredients of shots vary from bartender to bartender and from region to region. Two shots can have the same name but different ingredients, resulting in two very different tastes.

== List of drink shots ==
=== Beer shots ===
Mixed shots

- Boilermaker or Depth Charge: a beer mix
- Snakebite
- U-Boot: a beer mix
- Irish car bomb: a mix of Irish whisky and Irish cream or other ingredients in a pint-glass of Irish stout.

=== Non-alcoholic base shots ===
Mixed shots

- Jägerbomb, or Bulldozer, or Blaster: a shot glass with Jägermeister dropped into a glass of half a can of Red Bull.

=== Irish cream shots ===
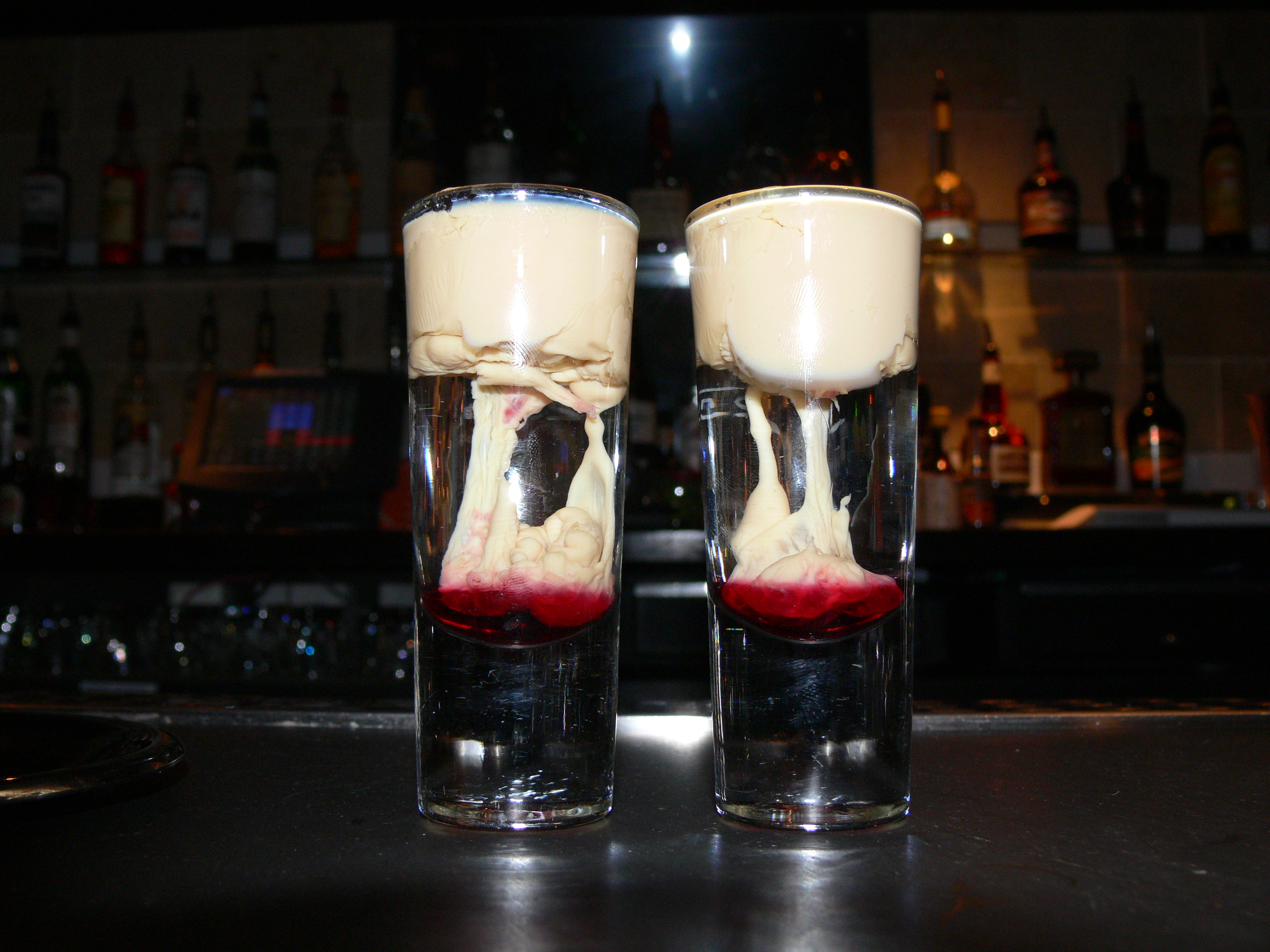
A Brain Hemorrhage layered shot

Layered shots

- B-52 (and related B-50 series cocktails).
- Baby Guinness: Two thirds to three quarters of a shot glass filled with coffee liqueur. Irish cream poured gently, over the back of a spoon, onto the top of the liqueur. The finished result should give the impression, if done correctly, of a tiny pint of stout.

=== Rum shots ===
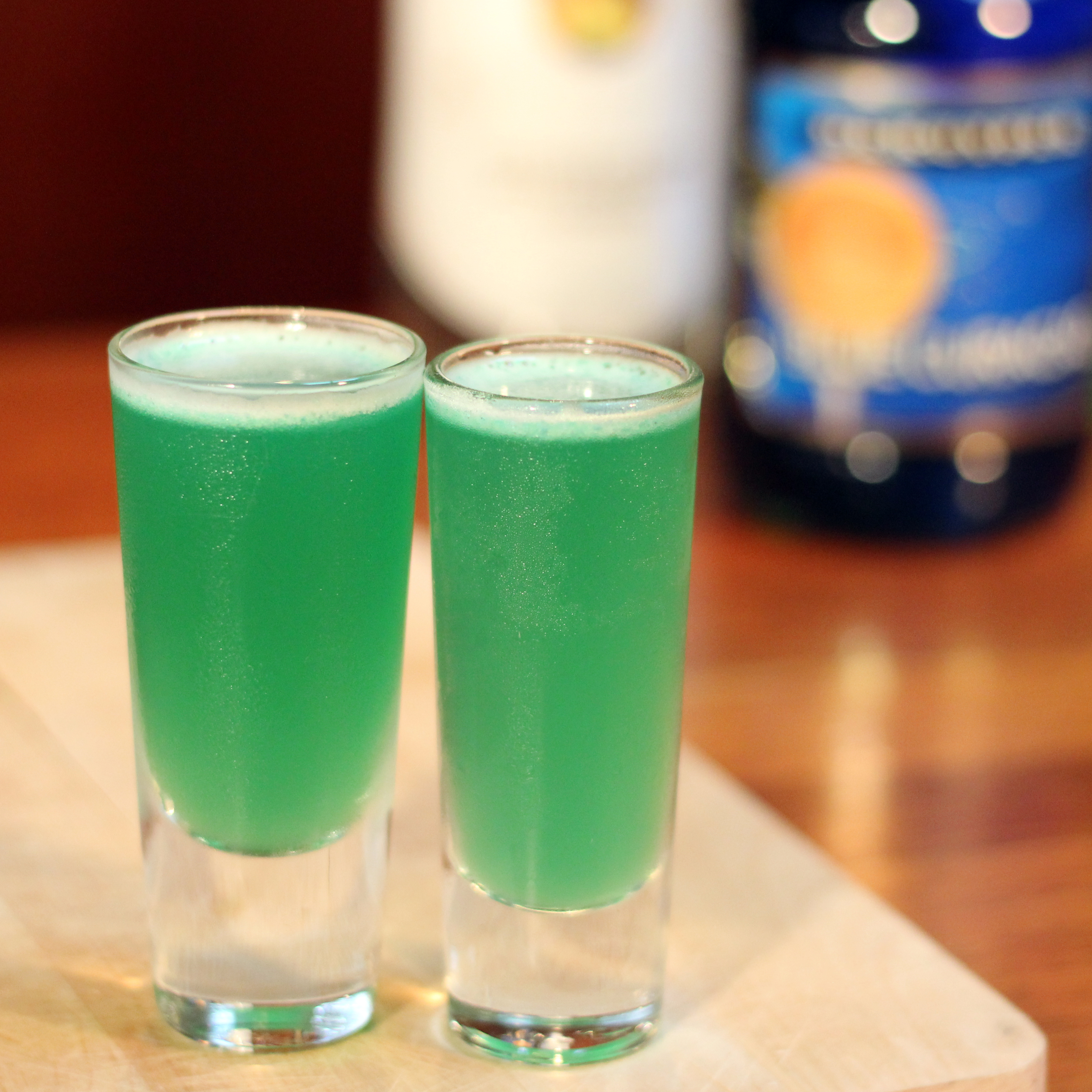
Two Liquid Marijuana shots side by side

Layered shots

- Flaming B-52 (also B-51, B-52 with Bomb-bay Doors, B-53, B-54, B-55, and B-57)

=== Tequila shots ===
- Prairie Fire: tequila and tabasco sauce
- Tequila slammer
- Tequesso: A shot of Tequila (often Patrón) chased by a shot of coffee

=== Vodka shots ===
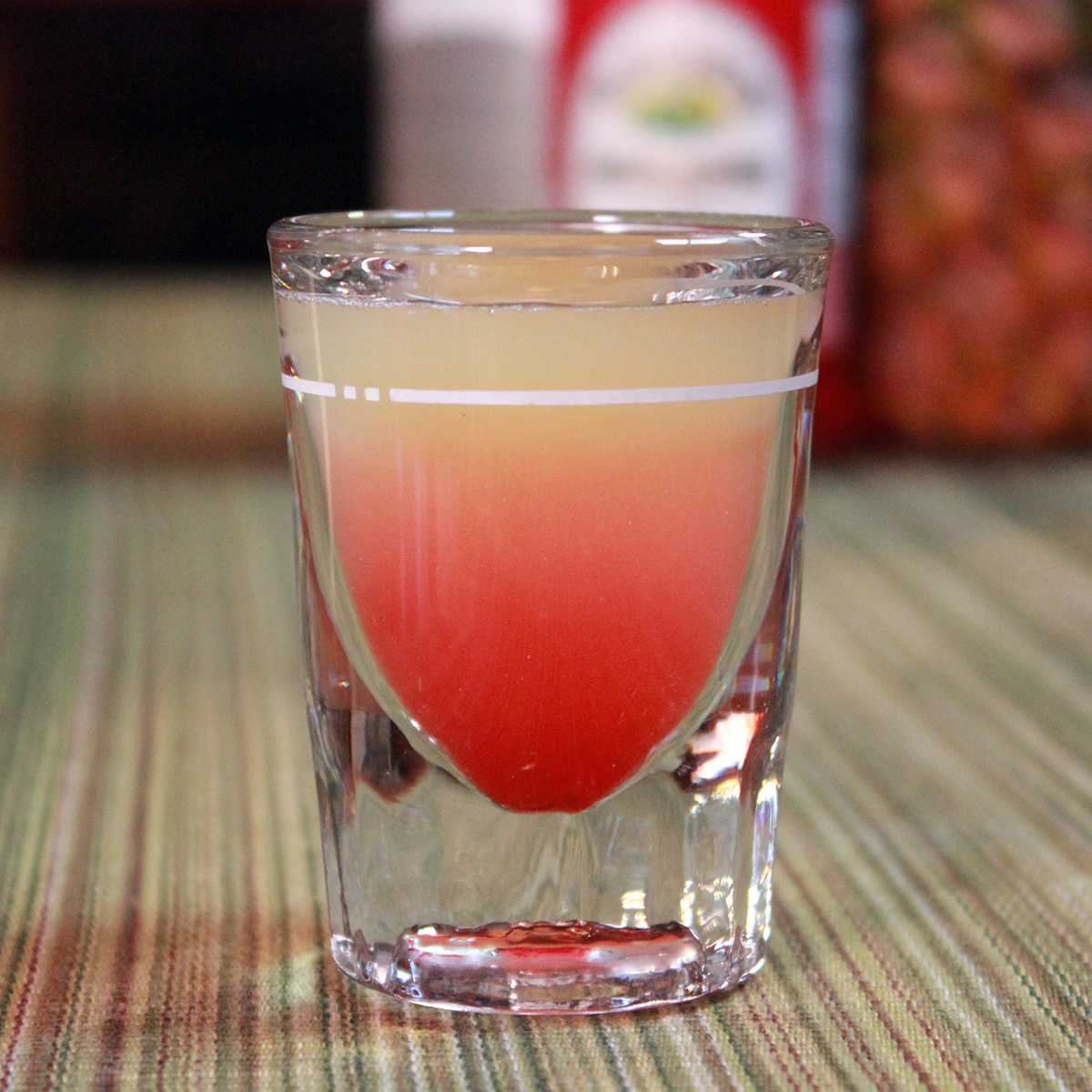
A Pineapple Upside-Down Cake Shot

Mixed shots

- Lemon drop: A chilled shot of lemon-flavored vodka served with a lemon wedge covered in sugar.
- Ruffe (see Boilermaker).
- Kamikaze: vodka, triple sec, and lime juice, mixed in equal parts. It is also served traditionally.
- U-Boot

=== Whiskey or bourbon shots ===
- Canadian Prairie Fire: Yukon Jack liqueur (made from Canadian whiskey and honey) and tabasco sauce
- Pickleback: A shot of whiskey (often Jameson Irish Whiskey) chased by a shot of pickle brine.
- Washington Apple: Equal parts Canadian whisky, sour apple liqueur, and cranberry juice

=== Wine, sparkling wine, or port shots ===
- Slammer Royale (see Tequila Slammer)

=== Cocktails with less common spirits ===
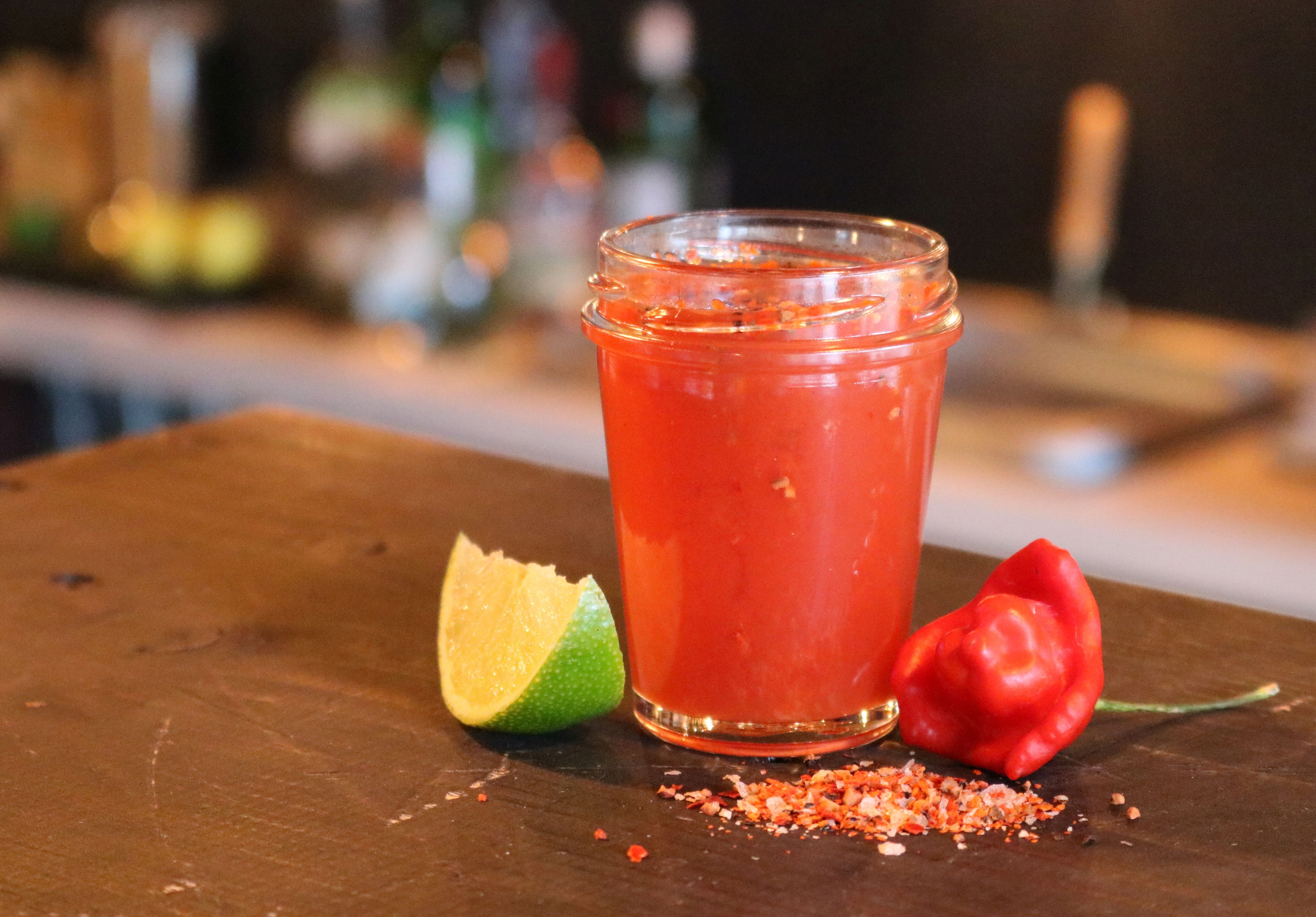
A Mexikaner, made with korn, tomato juice, and sangrita

Mixed shots

- Golden Elk: Jägermeister and Goldschläger
- Sake bomb

Layered shots

- Pousse Cafe

== See also ==
- Bartender
- Bomb shot
- Cocktail
- Drinking culture
- Flair bartending
- List of cocktails
- Snaps
