= Goldschläger =

Swiss cinnamon schnapps

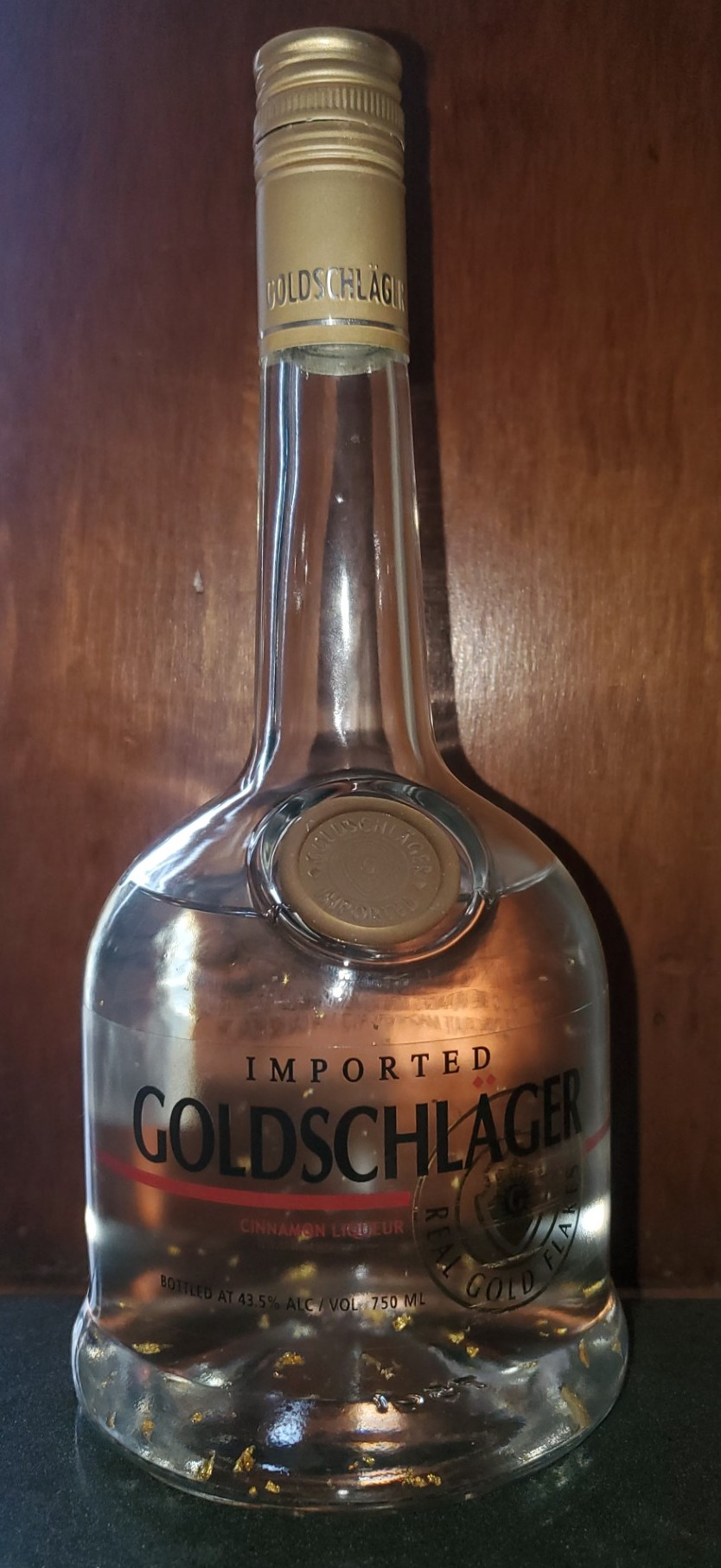
- A bottle of Goldschläger.
- Type: Cinnamon schnapps
- Manufacturer: Sazerac Company
- Origin: Switzerland
- Alcohol by volume: 43.5%
- Colour: Clear with gold flakes
- Website: goldschlager.com

Goldschläger is a Goldwasser-style schnapps (originally 53.5% alcohol, or 107 proof; now 43.5% alcohol by volume, or 87 proof) originally produced in Switzerland. It is a cinnamon-flavored liqueur with very thin, visible flakes of 24-karat gold floating in it. The actual amount of gold (which has no taste or flavour) has been measured at approximately 13 milligrams (0.20 grains) per one-liter bottle of Goldschläger. As of 4 September 2026, this amounts to €1.56/US$1.83 on the international gold market per one liter bottle of Goldschläger.

Goldschläger has its origins in Danziger Goldwasser, a gold-infused liqueur first created in Poland in 1606. The German word Goldschläger ("gold-beater") refers to the profession of gold-leaf makers who would beat bars of high karat, very soft gold into extraordinarily fragile, thin sheets called "gold leaf".

The Goldschläger brand was introduced in 1993. It quickly peaked in popularity as a shot drink throughout the '90s, before being overtaken in popularity by Jägermeister, and eventually cocktails. In the 1990s, the brand was acquired by British company Diageo, which moved production to Italy, but eventually returned to Switzerland in around 2008 (during this time period, production was associated with Global Brands). In the early 2000s, Goldschläger experienced a dip in popularity.

In 2018 Diageo began exploring splitting its brands up, and in November 2018, Diageo sold Goldschläger as part of a 19-brand portfolio of spirits brands to the New Orleans–based U.S. distiller Sazerac Company in a $550 million deal. Production was moved to Montreal. In 2023, Sazerac re-released the original high proof version, named Goldschläger 107.

While the Sazerac Company does not publish an ingredients list, elsewhere it is reported to be made of a neutral grain spirit flavored with cinnamon, herbs, and spices. It is recommended to be served neat, chilled, over ice (chilling may reduce the burning quality and enhance its refreshing nature), or in cocktails.

== See also ==
- Goldwasser, another liqueur containing flakes of gold leaf
