= Dried cranberry =

Partially dehydrating fresh cranberries

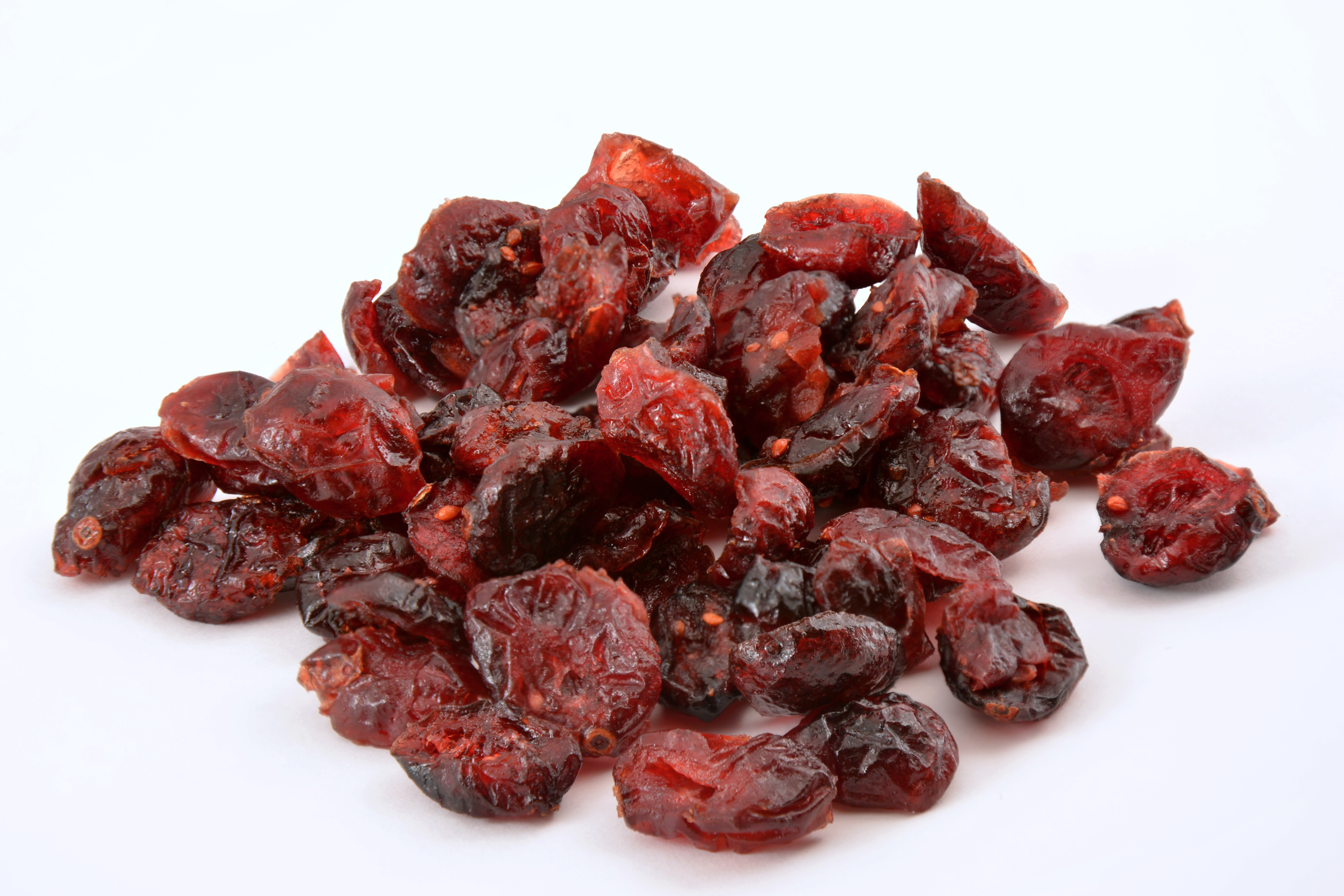
Dried cranberries

Dried cranberries are made by partially dehydrating fresh cranberries, a process similar to making grapes into raisins. They are used in trail mix, salads, breads, with cereals, or eaten on their own. Dried cranberries may be marketed as craisins due to the similarity in appearance with raisins, although the word "Craisin" is a registered trademark of Ocean Spray. Craisins were introduced as part of a packaged cereal produced by Ralston Purina in 1989.

Most commercially produced dried cranberries contain added sugar, and may be coated with vegetable oil to inhibit stickiness.

== Nutrition ==
Cranberries, dried
Nutritional value per 100 g
- Energy: 308 kcal (1,290 kJ)
- Carbohydrates: 82.8 g
- Sugars: 72.56 g
- Dietary fibre: 5.3 g
Vitamins and minerals
Vitamins	Quantity %DV^{†}
Vitamin A equiv. beta-Carotene lutein zeaxanthin	0% 2 μg 0% 27 μg 138 μg
Thiamine (B1)	1% 0.013 mg
Riboflavin (B2)	2% 0.028 mg
Niacin (B3)	3% 0.548 mg
Vitamin B6	2% 0.038 mg
Choline	2% 8.3 mg
Vitamin C	0% 0.2 mg
Vitamin E	14% 2.1 mg
Vitamin K	6% 7.6 μg
Minerals	Quantity %DV^{†}
Calcium	1% 9 mg
Copper	7% 0.063 mg
Iron	2% 0.39 mg
Magnesium	1% 4 mg
Phosphorus	1% 8 mg
Potassium	2% 49 mg
Selenium	1% 0.6 μg
Sodium	0% 5 mg
Zinc	1% 0.1 mg
- Other constituents: Quantity
- Water: 15.79
- ^{†}Percentages estimated using US recommendations for adults, except for potassium, which is estimated based on expert recommendation from the National Academies.

The nutrient content of dried cranberries may vary depending on the extent of dehydration, amount of sugar added during processing, and brand. According to an analysis by the US Department of Agriculture, dried cranberries are 16% water, 83% carbohydrates, 1% fat, and contain no protein.

A 100 g reference amount of dried cranberries supplies 308 calories, with a moderate content of vitamin E (14% of the Daily Value), and otherwise a low or absent content of micronutrients (table).

== Uses ==
Dried cranberries can be added for color and flavor to various foods, including salads, oatmeal, cookies, muffins, loaves, breads and trail mix. They may be used to replace raisins or any dried fruit. Dried cranberries may be prepared with flavorings or coverings, such as chocolate.

== Controversy ==
In 1989 after spending "millions of dollars" on raisin advertising, the California Raisin Advisory Board decried the similar name "Craisin", claiming that dried cranberries were "just the skin of the cranberry, sugar infused, and it's very tart."

== See also ==
- List of dried foods
