= Sylvia Schur =

American food columnist and innovator

Sylvia Zipser Schur (June 27, 1917 – September 8, 2009) was an American food columnist and innovator. She wrote many cookbooks and has been credited with developing Clamato and Cran-Apple juice. She also wrote recipes for Ann Page and Betty Crocker and helped develop menus for restaurants, including the Four Seasons in Manhattan. Schur was a columnist for PM, Seventeen, Look, Woman's Home Companion, and PARADE.

Schur graduated from Hunter College in 1939, and was employed as a market reporter for PM, an ad-free New York City newspaper, turned that into a food column for the paper. She then went to Seventeen, where she convinced the editor that teens cared about food and became the magazine's first food editor. Her trail as food editor carried her to Look, Woman's Home Companion, an ill-fated magazine, and finally Parade, where she succeeded Julia Child and preceded Sheila Lukins as food editor. In a parallel path, she was a product developer for various food companies, such as Ocean Spray Cran-Apple juice. She helped develop the original menu of The Four Seasons Restaurant in New York City.

== Personal life ==
Following the death of her husband Saul Schur, just before their 50th wedding anniversary, Schur married architect Kaneji Domoto, who died in 2002. She had 3 children, daughter Jane Smith, and sons, Stephen and Jonathan, and grandchildren.

== Publications ==
Some of Schur's publications include:

- Creative Cooking in 30 Minutes: Over 380 Imaginative and Delicious Recipes for the Busy Cook Who Likes Good Food (1975)
- The Tappan Creative Cookbook for Microwave Ovens and Ranges (1976)
- The Woman's Day New French Cookery (1977)
- Seagram's Complete Party Guide: How to Succeed at Party Planning, Drink Mixing, the Art of Hospitality (1979)
- Delicious Quick-Trim Diet with Sam Baker (1983)
- Woman's Day Crêpe Cookbook (1984)
- Trim a Treat Edible Christmas Decorations (1984)
- Dinner in Half an Hour (1984)
- Cheesecakes (1981)
- 365 Easy Low-Calorie Recipes (1990)

== See also ==
- List of newspaper columnists
