= Ocean Spray (cooperative) =

American agricultural cooperative

Ocean Spray Cranberries, Inc.
- Logo as of 2024
- Type: Agricultural cooperative
- Founded: 1930; 96 years ago in Hanson, Massachusetts
- Founders: Elizabeth Lee, John Makepeace, and Marcus Urann
- Headquarters: Lakeville-Middleborough, Massachusetts, U.S.
- Key people: Abigail Buckwalter, President and CEO
- Products: Cranberries, grapefruit
- Website: oceanspray.com

Ocean Spray Cranberries, Inc. is an American agricultural cooperative of cranberry growers headquartered in Plymouth County, Massachusetts. It currently has over 700 member growers (in Massachusetts, Wisconsin, New Jersey, Oregon, Washington, Florida, British Columbia and other parts of Canada, as well as Chile). The cooperative employs about 2,000 people, with sales of $1.2 billion in fiscal year 2013 and accounts for 70% of North American cranberry production. Their products include cranberry sauce, fruit juices, fruit snacks, and dried cranberries.

The cooperative has made a number of innovations, including the first juice blend, the first juice boxes, and sweetened dried cranberries (Craisins). Its cranberry juice won the ChefsBest Award for best taste.

Ocean Spray has juice-filling facilities in Henderson, Nevada; Sulphur Springs, Texas; Allentown, Pennsylvania; and Kenosha, Wisconsin.

== History ==
Ocean Spray was formed as Cranberry Canners, Inc. in 1930 by three cranberry growers who wanted to expand their market for cranberries. Marcus L. Urann, a lawyer-turned-grower, Elizabeth F. Lee, a New Jersey-based grower, and John C. Makepeace, the nation's largest grower at the time, based their cooperative in Hanson, Massachusetts. As a cooperative, they would be partially immune to antitrust laws, allowing them to set better prices for all members without being considered a monopoly. The business was initially seasonal, with growers selling cranberry jelly and a (much tarter form of) juice for Thanksgiving and Christmas. Urann, the first grower to can cranberry sauce, proved to be instrumental in the canning and bottling of cranberry products. Cranberry Juice Cocktail was introduced in 1933 and the jellied cranberry sauce “log” became available nationwide in 1941. The group added members from Wisconsin, Oregon, and Washington, and became the National Cranberry Association in 1946. In 1957, it became Ocean Spray after acquiring the name and logo from a fish company in Washington.

In 1959, a cancer scare linked to herbicide used by growers resulted in a significant loss of revenue and crop. Fearing their vulnerability with just one product, the cooperative decided to also go into marketing. A cranberry reserve and proceeds pool was established. In 1963, executive Edward Gelsthorpe worked with Sylvia Schur to develop Cranapple juice, a product that brought the cranberry to greater popularity and increased usage to year-round, earning Gelsthorpe the nickname "Cranapple Ed". The co-op soon produced Cran-Apple and Cran-Grape variations as well. During the decade, Ocean Spray began pushing cranberry juice as a cocktail ingredient. By 1966, drink recipes were printed on every bottle of Cranberry Juice Cocktail.

In 1976, the cooperative expanded its membership to grapefruit growers in Florida. Within two years, Ocean Spray Grapefruit Juice had captured 5% of the market and was available in 60% of US stores. In September 1976, the headquarters was moved from Hanson to Plymouth, Massachusetts and a museum, called Cranberry World, opened the following year. The museum was later moved to Edaville Railroad in Carver, Massachusetts in 2002. By 1978, Ocean Spray was made up of 705 growers and held $92 million in assets with sales in 50 countries. By this point, the sale of fresh cranberries made up only 6% of Ocean Spray's business and half its sales came from juice. That year, it also forged a manufacturing partnership with prune growers in California. By 1986, sales reached $640 million.

In 1988, the company was indicted on felony charges under the Clean Water Act that, from 1983 to 1987, its Middleboro, Massachusetts processing plant had polluted the town's sewer system and the nearby Nemasket River. Ocean Spray settled the case by pleading guilty to 21 misdemeanor charges and paying a $400,000 fine. In 1989, Ocean Spray introduced the craisin as a registered trademark. The company's headquarters were also moved to a building on the Lakeville-Middleborough town line.

By 1991, the company had operations in Massachusetts, Wisconsin, New Jersey, Washington, Oregon, Florida, and Canada. Ocean Spray entered into a joint venture with PepsiCo starting in 1992 as a response to the sudden popularity of Snapple. However, the venture only lasted until 1995 and a distribution deal was maintained thereafter, focusing on single-serve offerings. Pepsi ultimately purchased Tropicana in 1998. Ocean Spray sued, citing breach of their exclusive contract, before ultimately dropping the case.

In 1993 a group of growers broke away to form Northland Cranberries, becoming Ocean Spray's biggest rival. In 1994, a Harvard University study showed that cranberry juice had a positive effect on urinary tract infections, creating an increase in demand for cranberries. Additional focus was placed on the berry's high level of proanthocyanidins and antioxidants. As a result, Ocean Spray increased its acreage from 30,000 to 50,000, while the number of independent growers increased. By 1999, supply had surpassed demand.

In 1997, Ocean Spray acquired a majority stake in juice purveyor Nantucket Nectars for $70 million. Between 1998 and 1999, its market share fell by 10%. As a result, the cooperative reduced its staff by 15% at its headquarters in Lakeville, Massachusetts. During the summer of 2000, cranberries were so abundant that the US government ordered growers to cut their production by 15%.

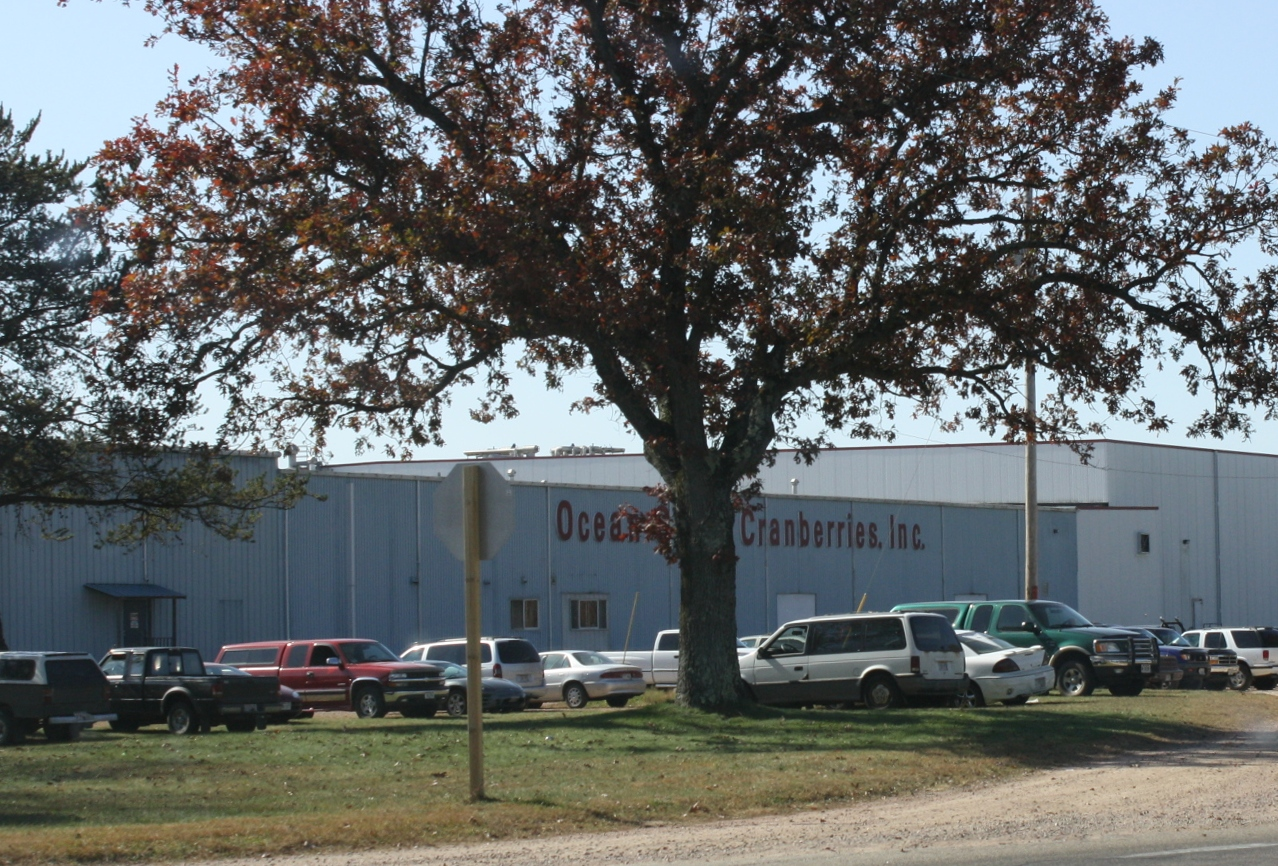
Processing plant near Babcock, Wisconsin, 2010

An effort was made to convince the company's board to investigate a sale of Ocean Spray. However, the idea was ultimately dismissed. Instead, the chief executive announced his retirement, the board was restructured, and an external review of its operations was commissioned. In 2000, growers feeling discontented with the board's decision sued Ocean Spray in an attempt to force the company to consider a sale. In January 2001, growers voted against a sale. That year, cranberry prices fell to their lowest point since the 1950s. The US Department of Agriculture ordered farmers to cut their production by 35%. In an effort to increase demand, Ocean Spray introduced white cranberry juice in 2002. It also sold Nantucket Nectars to Cadbury Schweppes, in order to focus on its core juice offerings. In November, the co-op's chief executive abruptly resigned and Northland filed an antitrust lawsuit against Ocean Spray.

In 2003, Northland Cranberries made an $800 million offer to purchase Ocean Spray, but it was ultimately rejected. That March, the co-op voted to replace its 15-member board with a 12-member board that would be more responsive to the needs of smaller growers and open to selling the business.

In May 2004, PepsiCo made a formal offer to purchase half of the co-op, but members voted down the sale of the cooperative's beverage business. Pepsi had offered the co-op $100 million, an assumption of debt and fixed prices for cranberry harvests. In July, growers representing 6% of Ocean Spray's annual berry volume left the cooperative.

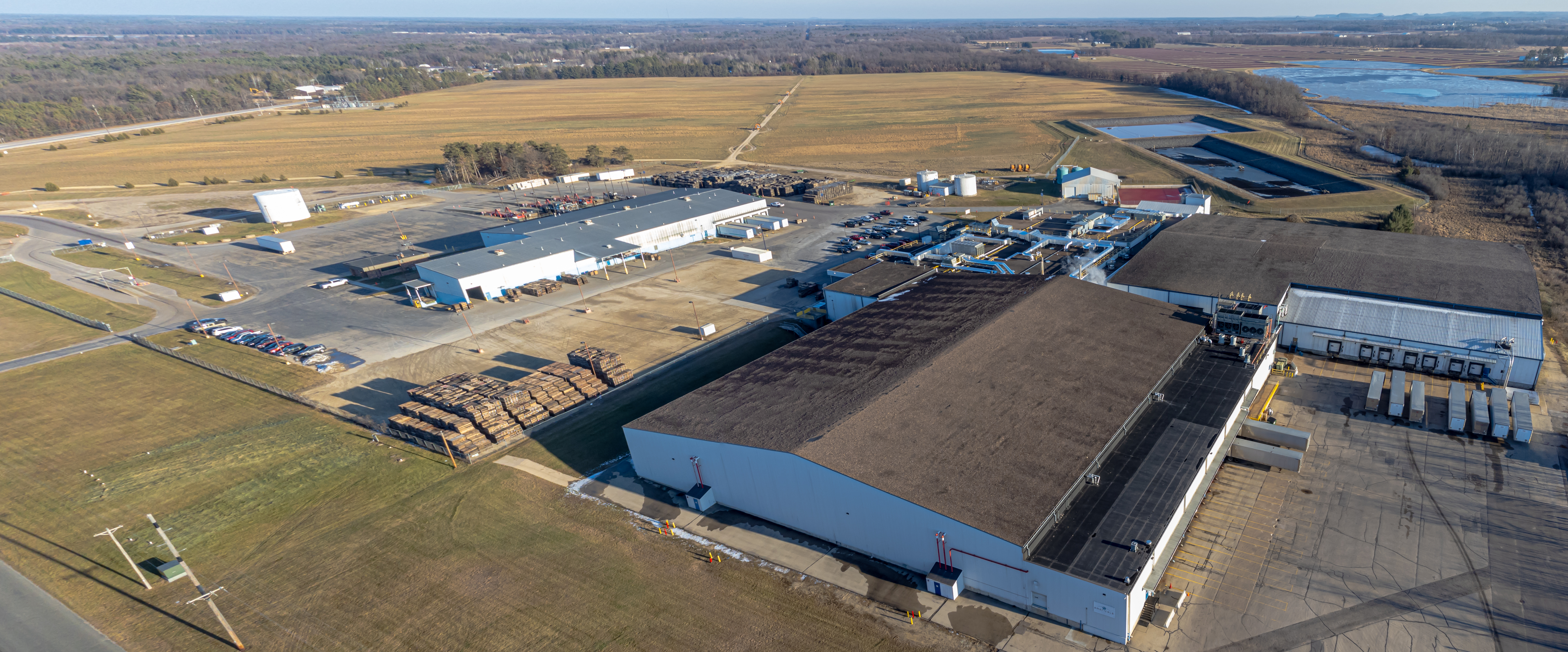
Ocean Spray in Tomah with cranberry fields in the background

In September 2004, Ocean Spray agreed to purchase the processing assets of Northland Cranberry for $28 million, ending the company's antitrust lawsuit. This acquisition included a juice production facility in Wisconsin Rapids, Wisconsin.

In June 2006, at the request of People for the Ethical Treatment of Animals (PETA) Ocean Spray agreed to end its support for animal experiments. Previously, Ocean Spray had funded tests involving infecting mice with H. pylori, bacteria that cause stomach ulcers, and then feeding them cranberry juice to see if it had any positive effect. These experiments were conducted to determine the usefulness of Ocean Spray's cranberry juice as a digestif. In July 2006, the cooperative signed a 25-year single-serve (machine-dispensed) juice distribution deal with Pepsi.

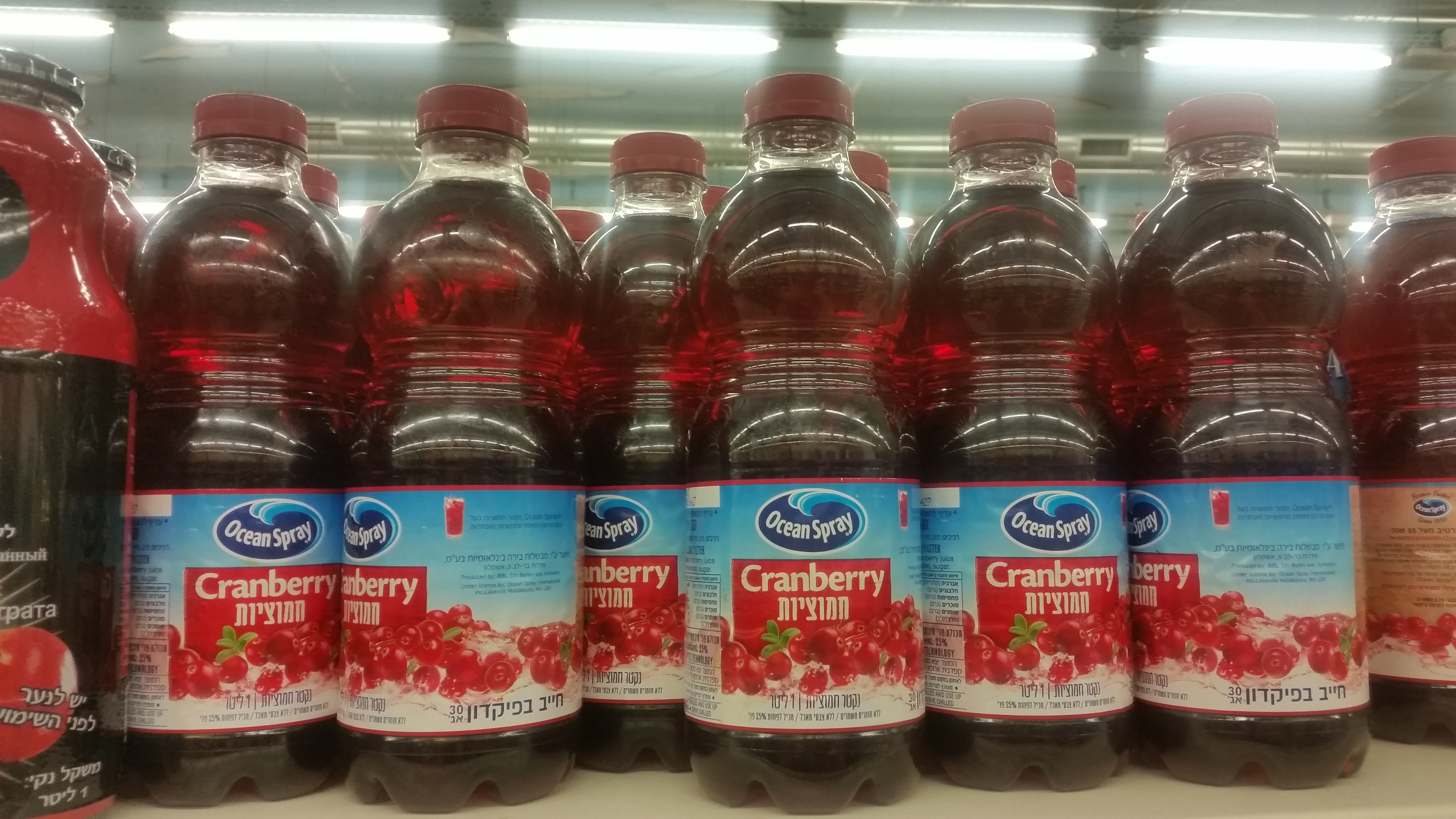
Ocean Spray product exhibited in Israel in 2016

Ocean Spray completed expansion of the Wisconsin Rapids processing plant in September 2008. The addition doubles the facility size to 440,000 sq ft (41,000 m^{2}), making it the world's largest cranberry processing facility. With the addition, the plant will produce Craisins, in addition to currently produced juice concentrates.

By the end of 2008, Ocean Spray had established new markets overseas. Australia, Britain, Canada, and Germany were among the most successful markets. Sales in Japan accounted for about five percent of its overseas sales.

Starting in 2003, Ocean Spray had increased production of craisins. However, the surplus of cranberry juice concentrate soon hurt the market. To alleviate the surplus, the company began auctioning off the excess inventory in 2009. The low prices on these auctions set a base price for the market, resulting in independent growers filing a class-action lawsuit accusing them of price fixing.

In the 2000s, the co-op set up cranberry bog displays in Las Vegas and Rockefeller Center in Manhattan. In 2010, it made a deal with Disney to set up a similar exhibit at Epcot. In 2014, Ocean Spray partnered with PepsiCo International to manufacture and distribute cranberry drinks in Latin America.

In 2011, Ocean Spray announced it would close its bottling plant in Bordentown, New Jersey in favor of a new facility in Pennsylvania's Lehigh Valley. The plant ultimately closed in 2014 after 71 years of operation. That same year, a new 300,000-square-foot facility opened in Upper Macungie Township, which would handle about 40% of the company's North American volume of juice products.

Throughout 2012, Ocean Spray contributed $387,100 to a $46 million political campaign known as "The Coalition Against The Costly Food Labeling Proposition, sponsored by Farmers and Food Producers". This organization was set up to oppose a California citizen's initiative, known as 2012 California Proposition 37, demanding mandatory labeling of foods containing genetically modified ingredients.

By 2012, another glut of cranberries had formed. In order to find demand for their supply, Ocean Spray began pushing into China. The burgeoning Chinese market was hurt in 2018 when the United States' trade war with China resulted in 15% reciprocal tariffs on US goods, including dried cranberries.

In 2019, Ocean Spray launched Lighthouse Innovation Incubator to develop new health and wellness products that the cooperative can market. The incubator has developed herbal tonics, a CBD sparkling water line, an edible gummy supplement, and water enhancers for dogs.

In January 2020, Ocean Spray settled a class-action lawsuit that claimed its products were misleading in advertising that they do not contain artificial flavors, since they contain malic acid and/or fumaric acid. The company agreed to pay $5.4 million dollars to claimants.

In February 2020, Ocean Spray dismissed its president and CEO, Bobby Chacko, for violating the company's harassment policy. In April, the company's cranberries were verified as 100% sustainable.
