= Cranberry juice =

Liquid juice of the cranberry

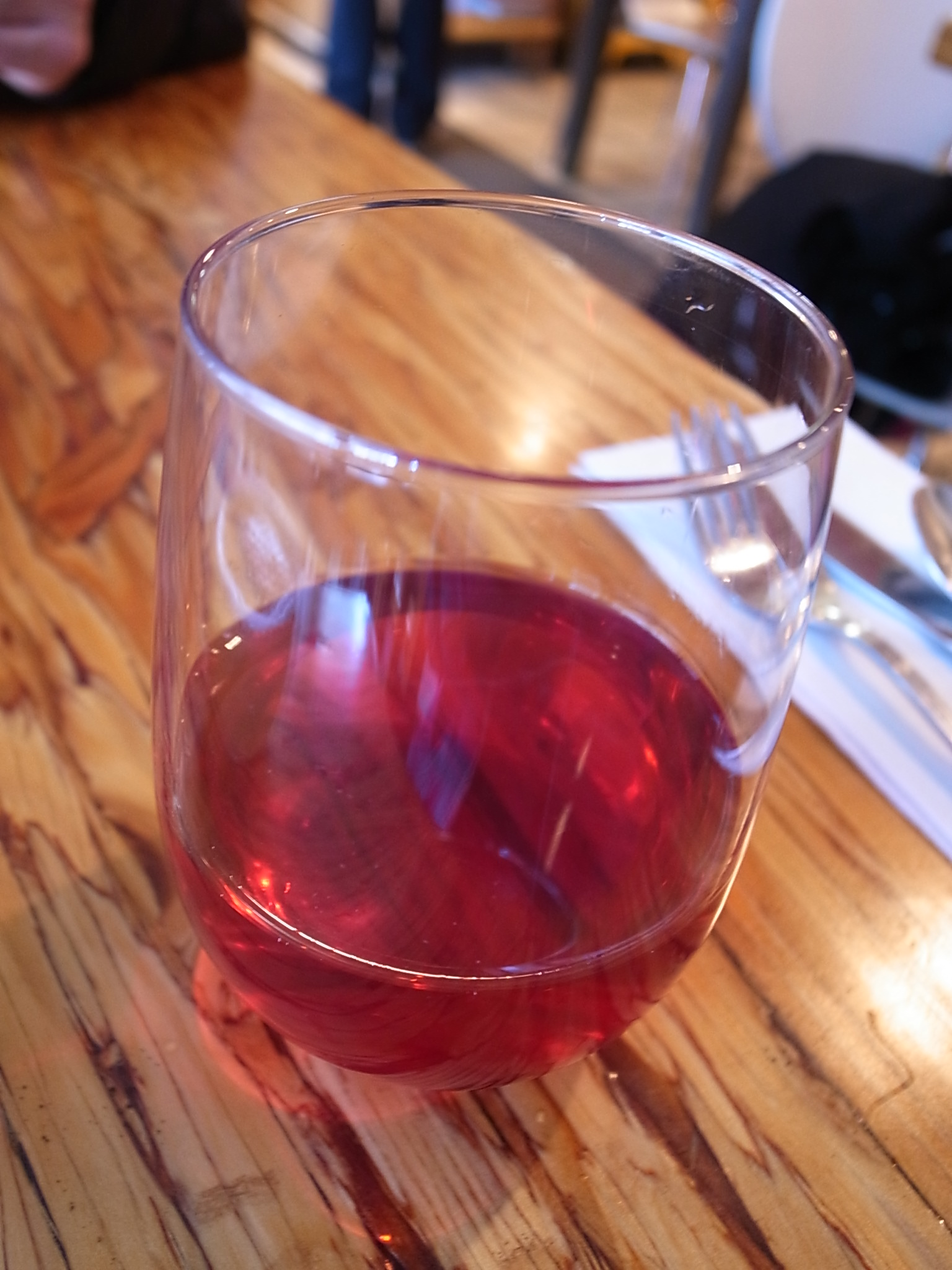

Nutritional value per 248 g (1 cup)
- Energy: 449 kJ (107 kcal)
- Carbohydrates: 26.2
- Sugars: 23.5
- Dietary fiber: 0.2
- Fat: 0.29
- Saturated: 0.005
- Monounsaturated: 0.005
- Polyunsaturated: 0.005
- Protein: 0.65
Vitamins and minerals
Vitamins	Quantity %DV^{†}
Vitamin A equiv. lutein zeaxanthin	163 μg
Vitamin A	60 IU
Thiamine (B1)	1% 0.012 mg
Riboflavin (B2)	3% 0.036 mg
Niacin (B3)	1% 0.226 mg
Vitamin B6	3% 0.043 mg
Folate (B9)	11% 43.2 μg
Vitamin B12	0% 0 μg
Choline	1% 4.3 mg
Vitamin C	84% 75.6 mg
Vitamin D	0% 0 μg
Vitamin D	0% 0.0 IU
Vitamin E	0% 0.02 mg
Vitamin K	0% 0 μg
Minerals	Quantity %DV^{†}
Calcium	4% 46 mg
Iron	1% 0.19 mg
Magnesium	3% 12 mg
Manganese	7% 0.16 mg
Phosphorus	2% 19 mg
Potassium	6% 182 mg
Selenium	0% 0.24 μg
Sodium	1% 14 mg
Zinc	1% 0.12 mg
- Other constituents: Quantity
- Water: 213
- Link to USDA Database entry
- ^{†}Percentages estimated using US recommendations for adults, except for potassium, which is estimated based on expert recommendation from the National Academies.

Cranberry juice is the liquid juice of the cranberry – a fruit recognized for its bright red color, tart taste, and versatility for product manufacturing. Major cranberry products include cranberry juice, dried cranberry, cranberry sauce, frozen cranberry, cranberry powder, and dietary supplements containing cranberry extracts.

The term "cranberry juice cocktail" or "cranberry juice blend" refers to products that contain about 28% cranberry juice, with the remainder either from other fruit juice concentrates (typically grape, apple or pear), water, and added sugar to improve palatability. Low-calorie cranberry juice products use non-caloric sweeteners.

Despite a long-held reputation for providing antibacterial activity against urinary tract infections (UTIs), cranberry juice has no proven effects on UTIs due to uncertainty about the quality of research, as determined by a Cochrane review of completed clinical research. A scientific panel for the European Food Safety Authority concluded a cause-and-effect relationship could not be established between cranberry consumption and risk of UTIs.

== Nutrition and composition ==
Cranberry juice is 86% water, 11% carbohydrates, and less than 1% fat or protein (table). A cup of standard (fortified) cranberry juice, amounting to 248 grams or 8 ounces, provides 107 calories and contains vitamin C as an ingredient to preserve freshness, with other micronutrients that may be added during manufacturing. Other than vitamin C and folate having more than 10% of the Daily Value, a typical serving of cranberry juice provides no micronutrients in significant content (table).

One half cup of cranberry juice provides 60 calories, 20% of the Daily Value for vitamin C, and counts as one-half of a fruit serving toward the United States MyPlate daily nutrition guide.

== Effect on health ==
Cranberry juice is an acidic drink with a pH of about 2.6. Some cranberry juice products contain large amounts of sugar used in manufacturing to make the drink more palatable, but their consumption may increase the risk of hyperglycemia and reduced control of blood glucose in people with diabetes or glucose intolerance.

=== Cranberry juice and urinary tract infection ===
In 2008, there was tentative evidence that long-term use of cranberry juice might help prevent symptomatic urinary tract infections (UTIs), but this finding was refuted in 2012 with a conclusion that "14 further studies suggest that cranberry juice is less effective than previously indicated," and "cranberry juice cannot currently be recommended for the prevention of UTIs." The European Food Safety Authority reviewed the evidence and concluded a cause and effect relationship has not been established between the consumption of cranberry products and reducing the risk of UTIs.

One systematic review in 2017 showed that cranberry products significantly reduced the incidence of UTIs, indicating that cranberry products may be effective particularly for individuals with recurrent infections. When the quality of meta-analyses on the efficacy of cranberry products for preventing or treating UTIs was examined, large variation was evident, resulting from inconsistencies in clinical research methods. A further systematic review published in 2023 concluded there is evidence that consuming cranberry products is effective for reducing the risk of UTIs in women with recurrent UTIs, in children, and in people susceptible to UTIs following clinical interventions; in this same review, there was little evidence of effect in elderly people, those with urination disorders, or pregnant women.

In September 2017, Ocean Spray, a major cranberry juice manufacturer, submitted a health claim petition to the FDA. According to the FDA's February 2018 response letter, the company had "requested that FDA authorize a health claim for the relationship between the consumption of cranberry juice products and a reduced risk of recurrent urinary tract infection in healthy women." The FDA stated that they would consider the petition for a "qualified health claim." This type of health claim label does not require "significant scientific agreement" as the FDA's label with a higher standard, the "authorized health claim," does. Rather, "qualified health claims" only require that the claim be "supported by some scientific evidence." These types of health claims also do not need to "meet the significant scientific agreement standard" and must be accompanied by a disclaimer stating that there is insufficient evidence of the product affecting a disease, such as UTI. Further FDA guidance in 2019 notified cranberry juice manufacturers that added sugars necessary for making the juice appealing to consumers had to be declared on the nutrition facts panel of product labels, and the amount of sugar used would be reviewed by the FDA under its "enforcement discretion".

In October 2018, the National Institute for Health and Care Excellence's recommendation for self-care for lower UTIs in people aged 16 and over states that "no evidence was found on cranberry products or urine alkalinizing agents to treat lower UTI".

=== Dental health ===
Cranberry juice has a level of acidity (pH 2.6) that may erode tooth enamel if consumed undiluted.

== Manufacturing and processing ==
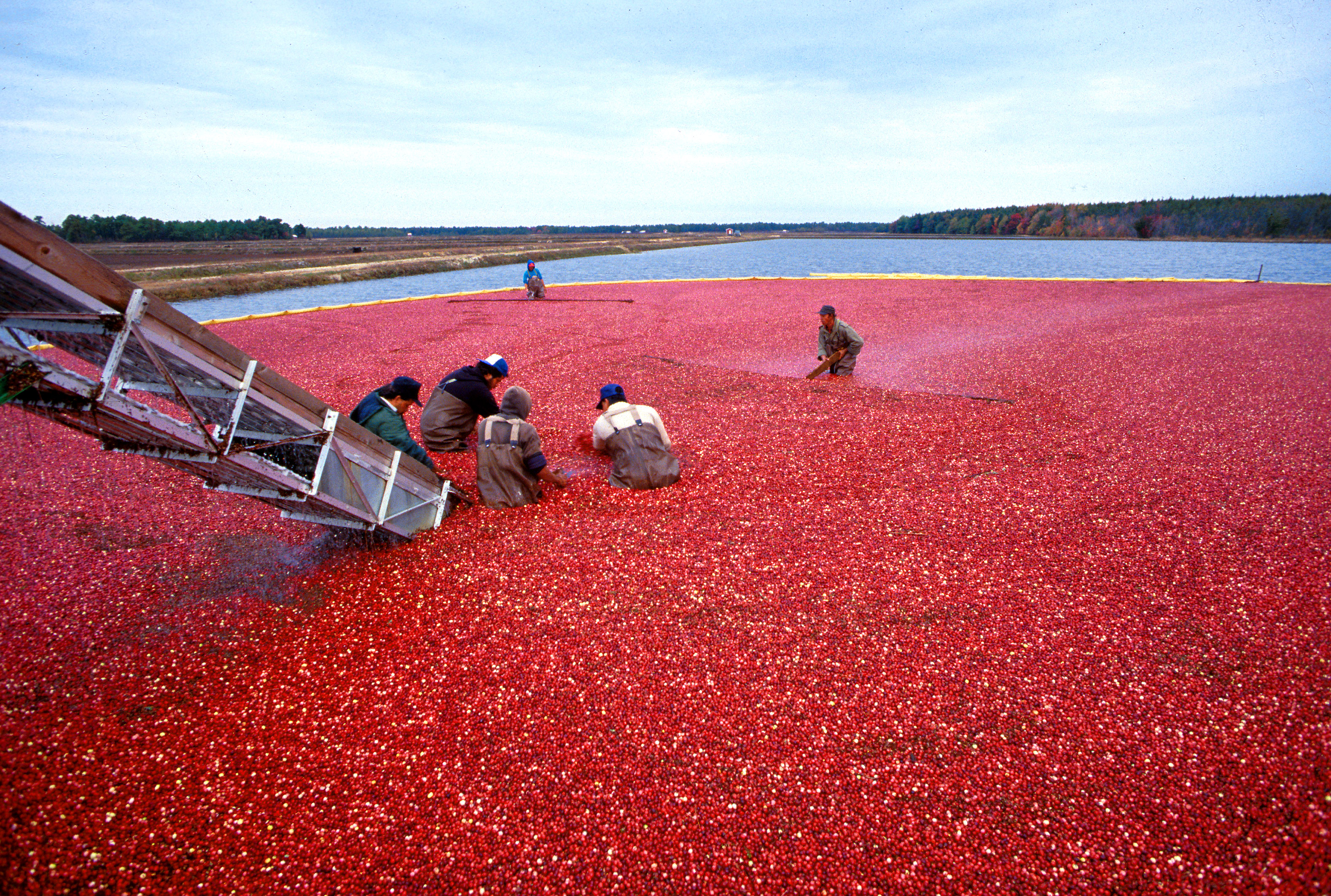
Wet harvesting of cranberries

=== Manufacturing ===
Cranberries are a kind of tart red berry produced by various plant species, but it is the large-fruited, or "American cranberry" (Vaccinium macrocarpon), that is farmed for commercial production. Currently, the main cranberry farming Canadian provinces are British Columbia, Québec, New Brunswick, Nova Scotia and Prince Edward Island. However, the lower temperatures present in the Eastern provinces require the use of irrigation and flooding to prevent frost damage and moisture loss. Wet harvesting is the common harvesting method used for cranberries that are to become cranberry juice. A paddled machine called a water reel harvester is used to separate the ripe cranberries from the vines, then collected through a large suction pipe and transported by truck to a processing plant. At the processing plant, the cranberries go through a sequence of fruit crushing, mash maceration, mash heating, juice pressing, and pasteurization to produce a cranberry concentrate that is separated from pulp. To prepare a cranberry juice/cocktail product, cranberry juice concentrate is reconstituted with varying amounts of water, specified by the solicitation, contract, or purchase order.

=== Sterilization ===
Traditionally, cranberry juice is commercially sterilized through thermal processing to eliminate any pathogenic or spoilage-causing microorganisms and spores. The prepared cranberry juice product is heat treated by high temperature-short time (HTST) or ultra-high temperature (UHT) techniques and packaged into aseptic, hermetically sealed containers. During thermal processing, the cranberry juice receives a heat treatment time equivalent to a 5-log pathogen reduction. Often, the bacterium Clostridium botulinum is given special attention during thermal processing techniques of food. However, C. botulinum does not grow and produce toxins below a pH of 4.6 and cranberry juice is classified as a high-acid food with a pH of 2.3 to 2.9.

==== Improved sterilization ====
In 2017, new methods of cranberry juice processing included high pressure processing (HHP) and pulsed electric field (PEF) technology. HHP treatment involves applying pressure (80,000 psi or 550 MPa) to cranberry juice for 1 to 9 minutes to eliminate any harmful bacteria, molds and viruses. The resulting raw cranberry juice, without thermal processing, is classified as a novel food item by Health Canada. PEF treatment involves generating a high-intensity electric field inducing a flux of electric current to flow through the food product to eliminate harmful microorganisms. PEF treated cranberry juice does not alter the flavor, color, or aroma profile of the cranberries used, unlike the traditional thermally processed method.

=== Tartness ===
Naturally, cranberries are low in sugar content and have a tart taste. As a result, unsweetened cranberry juice is generally considered unpalatable by consumers. To make the juice more palatable to consumers, the tart flavor can be made less acidic by blending with other fruit juices or the addition of sugar or sugar substitutes.

The tartness of cranberry juice derives from its mixed content of polyphenols, including flavonoids, proanthocyanidins, anthocyanins, phenolic acids, and ellagitannins.

=== Packaging ===
All cranberry juice products are required to be packed in aseptic, hermetically sealed containers (plastic bottles, cans, cartons) in accordance with good manufacturing practices of their country. The typical container size used are 11.5 or 64 fluid ounce, and each must be filled with the product by at least 90 percent. Cranberry juice products should also not be packaged more than 90 days prior to their delivery, unless specified in the order. Ocean Spray and Fruit d'Or cranberry juice products have a frozen shelf life of 24 months and 36 months, respectively.

== Regulations ==
=== Labeling ===
In 2020, the US Food and Drug Administration (FDA) announced that a qualified health claim would be allowed on cranberry juice product labels for reduced risk of recurrent urinary tract infection in healthy women consuming 8 US fluid ounces (240 mL) per day of a fruit juice product containing at least 27% cranberry juice. An example of the label claim provided by the FDA was: "Consuming one serving (8 oz) each day of a cranberry juice beverage may help reduce the risk of recurrent urinary tract infection (UTI) in healthy women. FDA has concluded that the scientific evidence supporting this claim is limited and inconsistent."

Cranberry juice container labels have the following information printed: product name and code, nutrition facts table, lot/drum number, date of packaging, brix, acidity, net weight, manufacturer name, manufacturer address and country of origin. According to Canada's composition claims, a "no preservatives" claim can be added to cranberry juice products if it only contains naturally occurring constituents that provide a preservative function such as benzoates.

=== United States ===
For many US markets, cranberry juice from concentrate is a blended mixture of cranberry juice or cranberry juice concentrate, water, sweeteners, and vitamin C (as ascorbic acid). The cranberry juice or concentrate in the mixture must be produced from clean, sound, mature, well-colored, and washed, fresh or frozen cranberries (Vaccinium macrocarpon). One or more of the following sweetening ingredients may be added: sucrose, liquid sugar, invert sugar syrup, or high-fructose corn syrup (40% or greater). The use of food additives (color, flavors, or acids) into cranberry juice depends on the percentage of cranberry juice or concentrate by volume. Cranberry juice mixtures with 25% or 27% contain none of the mentioned additives, except for ascorbic acid. Cranberry juice mixtures with 22% contain no added color or flavors, but citric acid may be added. Cranberry juice mixtures with 20% may contain color, flavors, and citric acid. The finished cranberry juice from concentrate product should yield a minimum of one part cranberry juice concentrate to three parts water with a minimum brix level of 12°. Additionally, each cranberry juice product should be fortified with vitamin C, with each serving size delivering not less than 100% of the current US Reference Daily Intake. The minimum titratable acidity of the cranberry juice product must be 1.67% wt/wt, measured as citric acid.

=== Canada ===
For Canadian markets, cranberry juice is regulated as a processed product under fruit juices. Cranberry juice must be made from sound, clean, and ripe cranberries. One or more of the following dry sweetening ingredients may be added: sugar, invert sugar, and dextrose. According to the Canadian Food Inspection Agency (CFIA), the common name of this product may appear as "cranberry juice drink/cooler" if at least 25% of the named juice is contained within the net quantity of the product.

In Canada, cranberries are graded into two categories: Canada No. 1 and Canada Domestic. The cranberries of Canada No. 1 grade are required to be fairly clean; be uniform in size; and free from any damage and/or defect that affects the appearance, edibility, or shipment quality. The cranberries of Canada Domestic grade are required to be reasonably clean; and be free from any damage and/or defect that seriously affects the appearance, edibility, or shipment quality. Furthermore, all grades must be properly packaged; be sound; have a minimum surface area of 65% coloured red; and be free of insects and insect larvae.

== Interaction with blood thinners ==
Cranberry juice may interfere with coumarins used as blood thinners, such as warfarin, causing an unstable INR. The British National Formulary (BNF) and the Food and Drug Administration (FDA) both advise avoiding concomitant use.

== Market ==
Commercially cultivated in the United States and Canada, cranberries are harvested in the autumn for manufacturing of juice and other products. A barrel of US cranberries weighing 100 pounds (45 kg) cost US$57.60 in 2017, but the price fell to $22.30 per barrel in 2019 due to international trade wars with the United States, causing the market to shift to more purchases from Canada.

Including cranberries used for juice production, Americans consume some 400 million pounds (180 million kg) of cranberries per year. About 95% of the annual US cranberry harvest is used to make juice or juice blends. Wisconsin was the leading producer of cranberries in the United States in 2017. Cranberries and juice concentrate exported from the United States were the objects of imposed tariffs during trade wars with the European Union, China, Mexico, and Canada over the period 2017–19.

== See also ==
- Juicing
- List of juices
