= Bitters =

Alcoholic preparation flavored with botanical matter

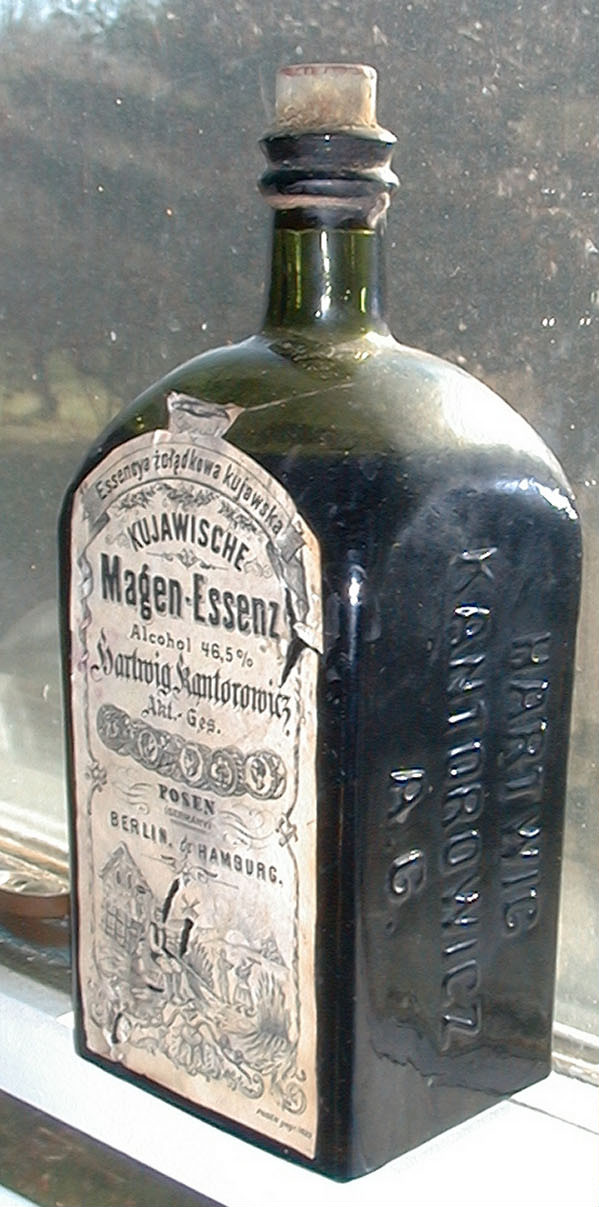
An old bottle of "Kuyavian Stomach Essence", bitters from Posen, Germany (now Poznań, in Poland)

A bitters is traditionally an alcoholic preparation flavored with botanical matter for a bitter or bittersweet flavor. Originally, many longstanding bitters brands were developed as patent medicines, but today they are sold as digestifs, sometimes with herbal properties, and as cocktail flavorings.

Since cocktails often contain sour and sweet flavors, bitters are used to engage another primary taste and balance the drink, making it more complex and giving it a more complete flavor profile.

== Ingredients ==
Historically, the botanical ingredients used to prepare bitters have consisted of aromatic herbs, bark, roots, and/or fruit for their flavor and medicinal properties. Some of the more common ingredients are cascarilla, cassia (Chinese cinnamon), gentian, orange peel, and cinchona bark.

Most bitters contain both water and alcohol, the latter of which functions as a solvent for botanical extracts as well as a preservative. The alcoholic strength of bitters varies widely across brands and styles. Some modern bitters are made with vegetable glycerin instead, allowing those avoiding alcohol to enjoy them.

== History ==
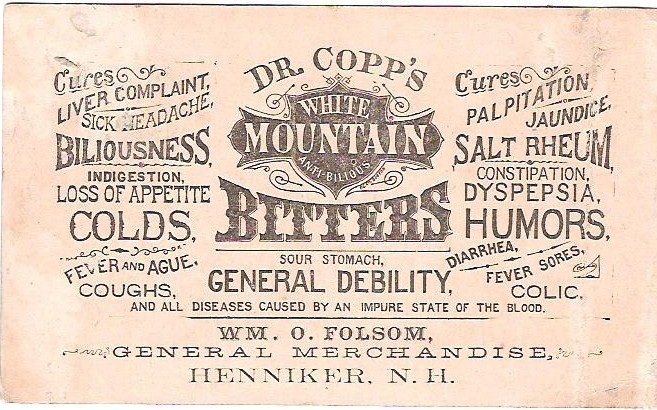
This 1883 advertisement promised help with a variety of ailments.

=== Early origins ===
The origins of bitters date back to ancient Egypt, where people may have infused medicinal herbs in jars of wine. This practice was further developed during the Middle Ages, when the availability of distilled alcohol coincided with a renaissance in pharmacognosy, which made possible more-concentrated herbal bitters and tonic preparations. Many brands and styles of digestive bitters reflect herbal stomachic and tonic preparations whose roots are claimed to trace back to Renaissance-era pharmacopeia and traditions.

=== Rise of commercial bitters ===
By the nineteenth century, the British practice of adding herbal bitters (used as preventive medicines) to Canary wine had become immensely popular in the former American colonies. By 1806, American publications referenced the popularity of a new preparation, termed cocktail, which was described as a combination of "a stimulating liquor, composed of spirits of any kind, sugar, water, and bitters".

Of the commercial aromatic bitters that would emerge from this period, perhaps the best known is Angostura bitters. Despite its name, the preparation contains no medicinal bark from the angostura tree; instead, it is named after the town of Angostura, later Ciudad Bolívar, in Venezuela. Eventually, the factory was moved from Bolivar to Port of Spain, Trinidad, in 1875. German physician Johann Gottlieb Benjamin Siegert had compounded a cure for sea sickness and stomach maladies, among other medicinal uses. Siegert subsequently formed the House of Angostura to sell the bitters to sailors.

Another renowned aromatic bitters with nineteenth-century roots is Peychaud's Bitters, originally developed by apothecary Antoine Amédée Peychaud in New Orleans, Louisiana. It is most commonly associated with the Sazerac cocktail.

A popular style of bitters that emerged from the period is orange bitters, whose flavor ranges from dryly aromatic to fruity and is commonly made from the rinds of Seville oranges and spices. Orange bitters are often called for in older cocktail recipes. An early recipe for such bitters is in The English and Australian Cookery Book: "Make your own bitters as follows, and we can vouch for their superiority. One ounce and a half of gentian root, one ounce and a half of lemon peel, and one ounce and a half of orange peel. Steep these ingredients for about a month in a quart of sherry, and then strain and bottle for use. Bitters are a fine stomachic, but they must be used with caution."

Bitters prepared from the bark of trees containing the antimalarial quinine were occasionally included in historical cocktail recipes. It masked the medicine's intensely bitter flavor. Trace quantities of quinine are still included as a flavoring in tonic water, which is used mostly in drinks with gin.

=== Bitters in cocktails and mixology ===
Pioneering mixologist Jerry Thomas helped popularize bitters in the United States when he released How to Mix Drinks or The Bon-Vivant's Companion in 1862.

== Digestive bitters ==
Digestive bitters are typically consumed in many European and South American countries either neat or on the rocks at the end of a meal. Many, including popular Italian-style amaros and German-style Kräuterlikörs, are also used in cocktails.

Some notable examples of modern digestive bitters include:

- Alomo Bitters (Ghana, Nigeria)
- Amaro Averna (Caltanissetta, Italy)
- Amaro Lucano (Pisticci, Italy)
- Amaro Montenegro (Bologna, Italy)
- Amaro Ramazzotti (Asti, Italy)
- Amaro Sibilla (Marche, Italy)
- Aperol (Padova, Italy)
- Balsam (Eastern Europe)
- Becherovka (Czech Republic)
- Beerenburg (Netherlands)
- Blutwurz (Bavaria)
- Braulio (Valtellina, Italy)
- Calisaya (United States)
- Campari (Novara-Milan, Italy)
- Cynar (Padova-Milan, Italy)
- Fernet-Branca (Milan, Italy)
- Fernet Stock (Italy-Czech Republic)
- Gammel Dansk (Denmark)
- Gran Classico Bitter (Switzerland)
- Hesperidina (Argentina)
- Jägermeister (Germany)
- Jeppson's Malört (United States)
- Killepitsch (Düsseldorf, Germany)
- Kuemmerling (Germany)
- Pelinkovac (Croatia)
- Quinquina (France – originally from South America)
- Rabarbaro Zucca (Milan, Italy)
- Ratzeputz (Germany)
- Riga Black Balsam (Latvia)
- St. Vitus (Germany)
- Schierker Feuerstein (Germany)
- Schrobbelèr (The Netherlands)
- Schwartzhog (Germany)
- Select (Veneto, Italy)
- Sirop de Picon (France)
- Suze (France)
- Tubi 60 (Israel)
- Underberg (Germany)
- Unicum (Hungary)
- Wódka Żołądkowa Gorzka (Poland)
- Wurzelpeter (Germany)

== Cocktail bitters ==
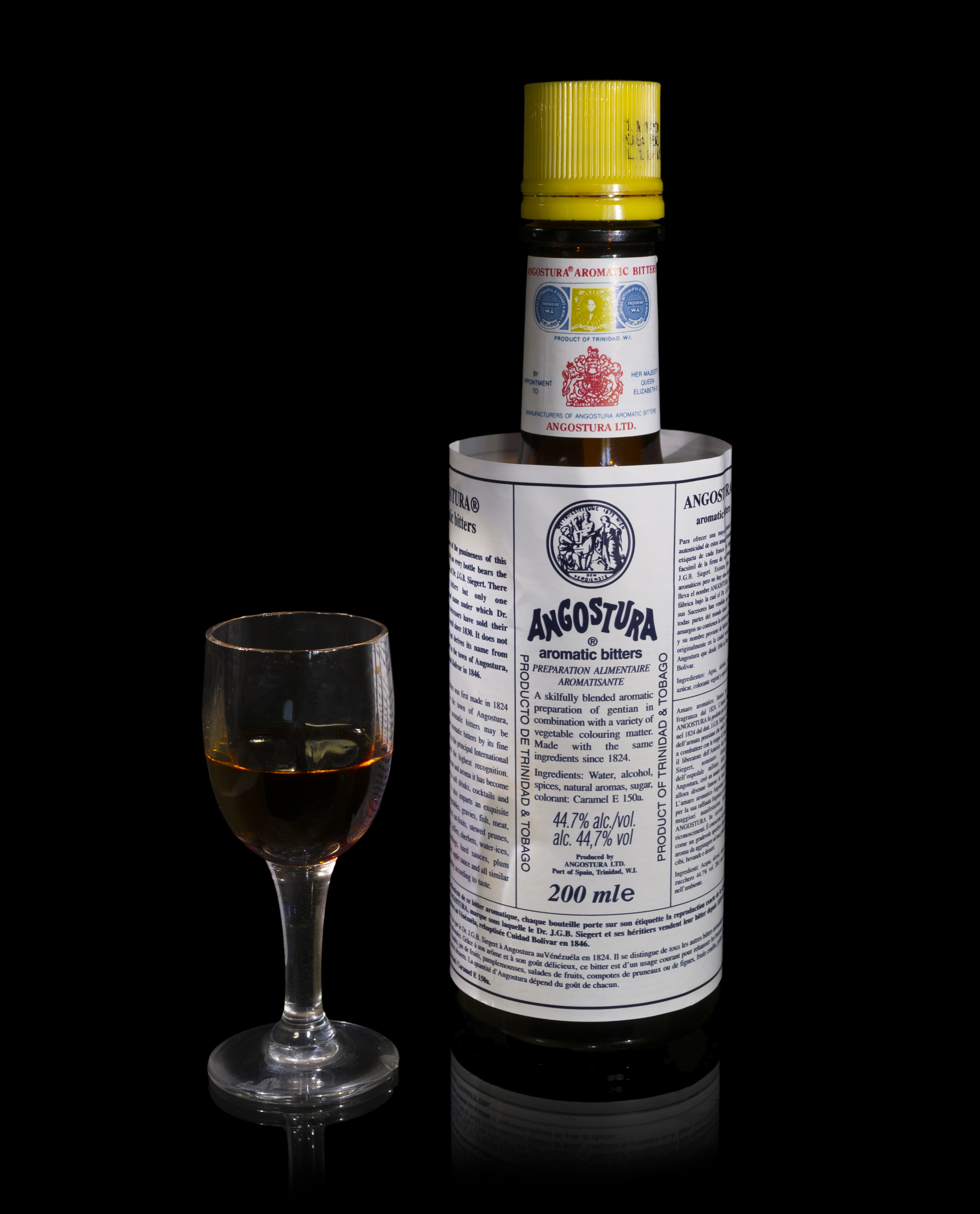
A bottle of Angostura aromatic bitters with its distinctive, over-sized label

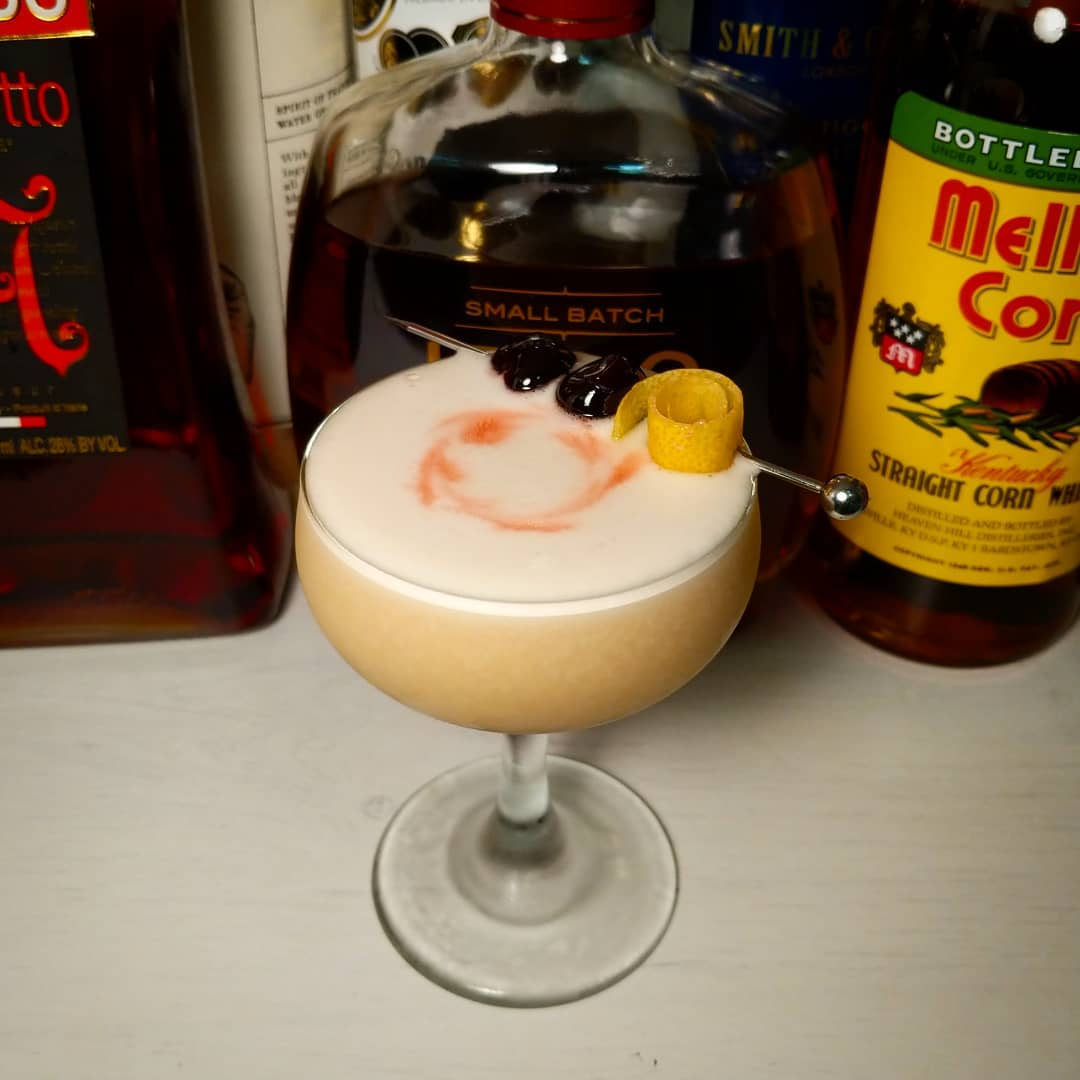
A whiskey sour, served in a coupe glass, is garnished with drops of Peychaud's Bitters swirled into the foam (from egg white) atop the drink.

Cocktail bitters are used for flavoring cocktails in drops or dashes. In the United States, many cocktail bitters are classified as alcoholic non-beverage products (non-beverage meaning not consumed like a typical beverage). As alcoholic non-beverage products, they are often available from retailers who do not sell liquor, such as supermarkets in many US states.

Some notable examples of cocktail bitters include:

- Angostura bitters – originally from Venezuela in 1830, currently from Trinidad and Tobago
- Boker's Bitters – called for in many cocktails in Jerry Thomas' drink guide, and essential to the Martinez cocktail
- Meinhard's Bitters – a now-defunct bitter with Venezuelan origins
- Peychaud's Bitters – originally from New Orleans, Louisiana, but now produced in Kentucky

== See also ==
Media related to Bitters at Wikimedia Commons

- Flavored liquor – alcoholic beverage with added flavoring and, in most cases, added sugar
- Gentian (spirit) – alcoholic drink
- Purl – alcoholic beverage
- Shrub (drink) – fruit liqueur or vinegared syrup cordial
- Swedish bitters – traditional herbal tonic
