= Bloodwort =

Bloodwort may refer to:

- Achillea millefolium, a flowering plant species native to the Northern Hemisphere and introduced in New Zealand and Australia
- Haemodoraceae or bloodwort family, a family of flowering plants found primarily in the Southern Hemisphere
- Sanguinaria canadensis, a flowering plant native to eastern North America
- Sanguisorba, a genus of flowering plants native to temperate regions in the Northern Hemisphere
- Capsella bursa-pastoris

== See also ==
- Redroot (disambiguation)
- Blutwurz
