= Amaretto di Saronno =

Amaretto di Saronno may refer to:

- Amaretti di Saronno
- Amaretto Disaronno Originale
