= See the Elephant Amaro =

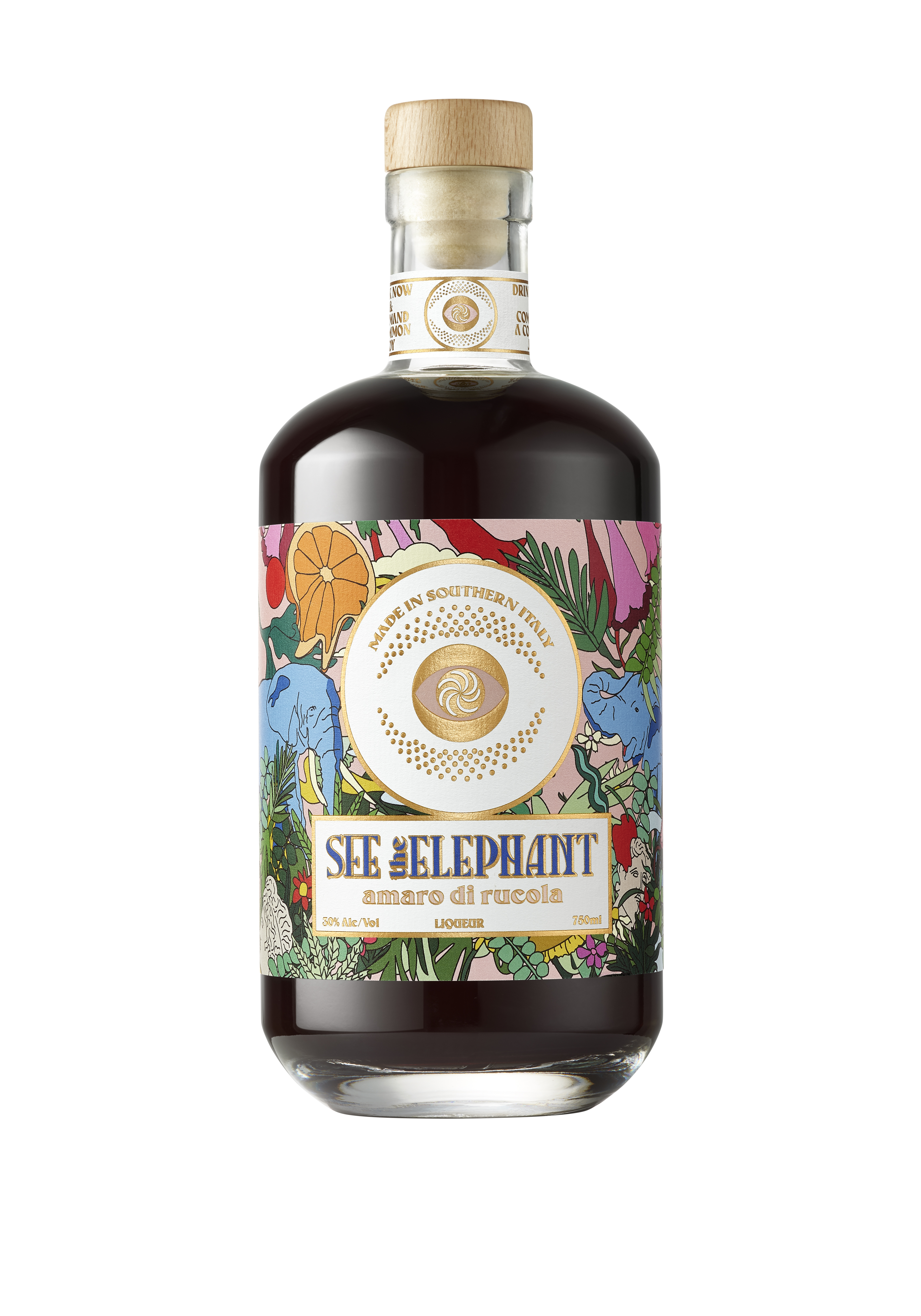
- Origin: Italy, Campania
- Introduced: 2022
- Alcohol by volume: 30%
- Proof (US): 60 proof
- Color: Dark
- Flavor: Herbal sweeter style
- Ingredients: Arugula
- Website: www.elephantamaro.com

See the Elephant Amaro di Rucola is a rucola (translates to arugula) style amaro made using arugula in southern Italy on the Cilento coast. Produced in Agropoli, Italy, which is near Salerno, Italy in the southern region of Campania. In addition to arugula there are some other herbs used to produce the amaro, which is part of the secret recipe. See the Elephant is considered one of the Ten Essential New School Amari according to Brad Thomas Parsons.

== Name ==
To "see the elephant" is an American figure of speech that comes from a 19th century phrase meaning to go out into the world to see something with your own eyes and to experience life firsthand.

The phrase was popular in the mid to late 19th century throughout the United States originally coined when travelers were going to see the first elephant being shown in the America's, Old Bet, in New York City. The phrase was often used during the American Civil War, the California Gold Rush, and the Westward Expansion Trails (Oregon Trail, California Trail and Mormon Trail).

In 1796 the first elephant exhibitor was Jacob Crowninshield displayed an Asian elephant at the corner of Beaver and Broadway. This was a young 8 foot tall elephant shipped from India, which was the first live elephant exhibit in the America's. It drew visitors from as far away as Virginia, the Carolinas and Pennsylvania, which at the time was quite the journey for someone to go see the elephant. This created the famous claim of going to "see the elephant" into a famous claim of worldly experience.

== Tasting Notes ==
Nose is rich with vanilla, allspice, mint and orange. Palate is complex with citrus flavors evolving into caramel, dark chocolate, bubble gum and sarsaparilla or root beer. Finish is smooth and warming with notes of pepper spice. Color is deep brown with amber highlights.

== Cocktails ==
Serve neat or on the rocks as traditional Italian amaro is used as a digestif (digestivo in Italian). See the Elephant is also utilized in classic and modern cocktails.

Black Manhattan

Paper Plane

== Awards ==
Bartender Spirits Awards - Double Gold - 96 Points Perfect score of 100 for mixability.

Diffords Guide, Simon Difford - 4.5 Stars

Amaro Aficionado, Robert Cross - 95 Points

== Artwork & Design ==
See the Elephant label and brand was designed by multi-disciplinary artist Cody Gunningham.
