= C. Person's Sons =

New York whiskey distillery

- Industry: Distillery/ Wholesale Distribution
- Founded: 1850
- Defunct: c. 1920
- Fate: Closed due to Prohibition
- Headquarters: 390-392 Elm St. Buffalo, New York, US
- Key people: Charles Person (founder)
- Products: Buffalo Club Rye Whiskey, Various

C. Person's Sons was a whiskey distillery and wholesale distribution center in Buffalo, New York from 1850 until 1920, closing due to Prohibition. Known throughout all of western New York as the "foremost whiskey rectifier", C. Person's Sons was known for integrity, the excellence of its wares, and the courteous handling of its customers.

== Founding ==
C. Person's Sons was founded by Charles Person, a German immigrant from the Alsace-Lorraine region. Person arrived in the United States at the age of fourteen and at the age of 23 opened up his business, simply called "Charles Person's", in a rented space of twenty-by-thirty feet.

Developing his skill and taste, Person also started a family with his wife Sophia in 1850, a family that would grow to include ten children (six boys, four girls). As early as 1875, the business listing filed by Person was now titled "Charles Person and Son", and by 1885, "Charles Person and Sons."

== Products ==
=== Distilled ===
Buffalo Club Whiskey logo.

- Buffalo Club Rye Whiskey
- Person's Kraüter Bitters
- Person's Pennsylvania Pure Rye Whiskey
- Riverside Whiskey

=== Distribution/Carried ===
- Bass Ale
- Anheuser-Busch Budweiser Beer
- Guinness Stout
- Sheboygan Mineral Water
- Meadville Rye Whiskey
- Jas. F. Pepper Whiskey
- Cinzan's Vermouth
- Cook's Imperial Champagne
- Klomp Gin
- Knickerbocker Malt Gin
- Suffolk Tom Gin
- Allasch Kümmel
- Corthell's Orange Bitters
- Pellich Gin
- Imported wines from Germany, Spain, France, Italy, and Hungary (until 1908)

== Owner/Operators ==
- Charles Person - 1850 - 1886
- William Person - 1886 - 1911
- Frank P. Person - 1911 - 1920 (w/ Daniel)
- Daniel H. Person - 1911 - 1920 (w/ Frank)

== Up to Prohibition ==
390-392 Elm Street.

In the few years leading up to the Volstead Act and Prohibition, C. Person's Sons enjoyed ever-increasing success. The firm was eventually established on historic Elm Street in Buffalo, occupying an impressive five-story building, specifically built for the firm. The building had lavish salesrooms and massive storerooms.

In 1908, C. Person's Sons appeared before a New York district court for violation of applicable laws relating to distilleries and whiskey as a medicinal component only. In the case, 93 cases of C. Person's Sons whiskey were confiscated (each case containing 12 bottles each) and ordered destroyed, unless properly packaged as a medicinal medium only, along with payment of a $2,000 bond. According to case files, the packaging was corrected and the bond was paid.

When Prohibition was finally enacted, C. Person's Sons was forced to close down, being too large of a business to continue running as a speakeasy or moonshine operation. Two weeks before the official closing, people from all over Western New York began lining up to buy and presumably stock up on what would soon become an illegal commodity. The line formed each day, all day, and when the business finally closed its doors, there were still 2,000 cases of whiskey still remaining, giving testament to the size and volume of C. Person's Sons business.
