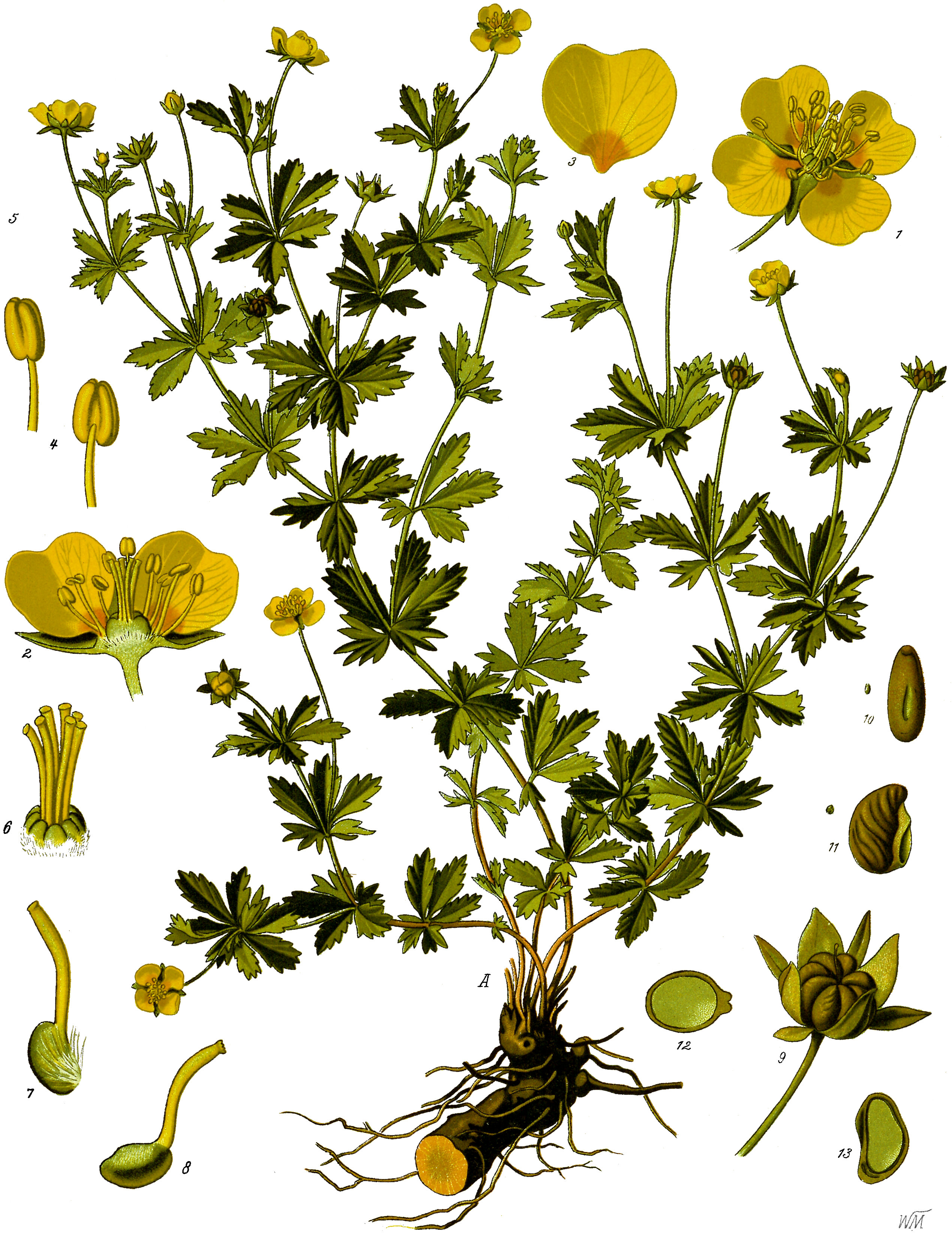

Scientific classification
- Kingdom: Plantae
- Clade: Embryophytes
- Clade: Tracheophytes
- Clade: Angiosperms
- Clade: Eudicots
- Clade: Rosids
- Order: Rosales
- Family: Rosaceae
- Genus: Potentilla
- Species: P. erecta

Binomial name
- Potentilla erecta (L.) Raeusch.

Synonyms
- Potentilla erecta Uspenski ex Ledeb.

= Potentilla erecta =

Species of flowering plant in the rose family

Potentilla erecta (syn. Tormentilla erecta, Potentilla laeta, Potentilla tormentilla, known as the (common) tormentil, septfoil, or erect cinquefoil) is a herbaceous perennial plant belonging to the rose family (Rosaceae).

== Description ==
Potentilla erecta is a low, clump-forming plant with slender, procumbent to arcuately upright stalks, growing 10–30 centimetres (3.9–11.8 in) tall and with non-rooting runners. It grows wild predominantly in Europe and western Asia, mostly on acid soils and in a wide variety of habitats such as mountains, heaths, meadows, sandy soils, and dunes.

This plant flowers from May to August or September. There is one yellow, 7–11 millimetres (0.28–0.43 in) wide flower, growing at the tip of a long stalk. There are almost always four notched petals, each between 3 and 6 mm long. Four petals are rather uncommon in the rose family. The petals are somewhat longer than the sepals. There are 20–25 stamens.

The radical leaves have a long petiole, whilst the leaves on the flowering stalks are usually sessile or with short petioles. The glossy leaves are alternate, ternate, consisting of three obovate leaflets with serrated margins. The paired stipules are leaflike and palmately lobed.

There are 2–8 dry, inedible fruits.

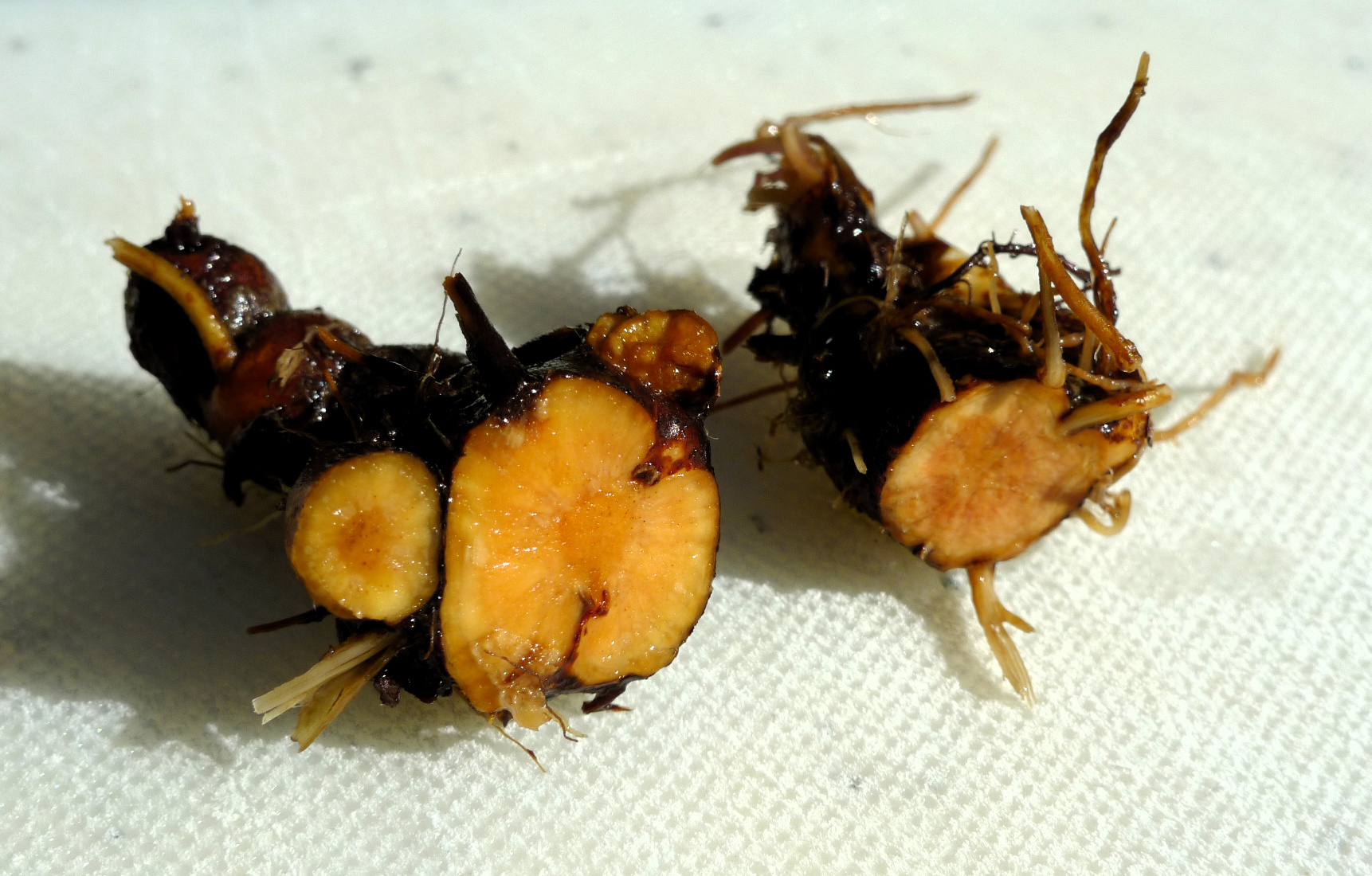
Rhizome of Potentilla erecta

== Distribution ==
=== Europe ===
Potentilla erecta is found wild throughout Europe, Scandinavia, and West Asia.

Potentilla erecta is almost ubiquitous in the British Isles, recorded in almost all 10 km squares except close to the Wash. and is listed as a species of least concern. It is very common in grasslands, heaths, moors, mountains, bogs including roadsides and pastures, mostly on acidic soils, but avoiding chalk. It is a component of British National Vegetation Classification community M25 (Molinia caerulea–Potentilla erecta mire).

=== North America ===
In North America Potentilla erecta is found in the east as an introduced species.

== Uses ==
The rhizomatous root is thick. It has little value for food use because of its bitterness and low caloric value. The roots are a main ingredient of a bitter liqueur from Bavaria and the Black Forest area, called Blutwurz. It is also used in Ukraine along with honey in horilka. The plant is used in herbal medicine as an astringent because of its tannin content, which is unusually high for a herbaceous plant. Structurally-related phlobaphenes, used as a red dye for leather known as tormentil red, can be extracted from the root of the common tormentil along with the triterpene alcohol tormentiol. Aqueous extracts of the rhizomes are reported to have low toxicity in rats and mice. Research into the plant during 2026 indicates that other significant medicinal uses may be indicated.
