= Gran Classico Bitter =

Branded apéritif/digestif

Gran Classico Bitter is an alcoholic apéritif/digestif (28% alcohol - 56 proof) created following the "Italian Bitter of Turin" recipe dating from the 1860s. This recipe, which was originally produced under the name Torino Gran Classico, had been purchased in 1925 from a Turin-based distillery by the small Swiss distillery E. Luginbühl, located near Bern.

It is made by soaking a mixture of 25 aromatic herbs and roots including wormwood, gentian, bitter orange, rhubarb, and hyssop in an alcohol/water solution in order to extract their flavors and aromas. This process is similar to that which was originally employed to make medicinal tinctures. The maceration creates a natural golden-amber color, although many other producers, such as Campari and Cynar that use Turin-style recipes dye their product carmine red. The final liquid is then filtered, reduced in alcoholic strength and sweetened with sugar before bottling.

Gran Classico Bitter is consumed straight or with ice, mixed with seltzer water or beer, and as an ingredient in cocktails, in the same fashion as other bitters or amaros. It is most frequently chosen as an alternative to Campari in the Negroni cocktail and its variations.

Gran Classico Bitter is imported into the United States, as is the brand name owned worldwide, by Tempus Fugit Spirits of Petaluma, California.
