= Brad Thomas Parsons =

American author

Brad Thomas Parsons is an author who writes about topics related to alcoholic drinks. He graduated with an MFA in writing from Columbia University.

== Selected works ==
- Bitters: A Spirited History of a Classic Cure-All (winner of the James Beard and IACP cookbook awards)
- Amaro: The Spirited World of Bittersweet, Herbal Liqueurs
- Distillery Cats: Profiles in Courage of the World's Most Spirited Mousers
- Last Call: Bartenders on Their Final Drink and the Wisdom and Rituals of Closing Time
