= Maria Treben =

Austrian writer and herbalist (1907–1991)

Maria Treben (née Günzel; 27 September 1907 – 26 July 1991) was an Austrian writer and herbalist who came to fame in the 1980s for her books.

== Early life ==
Treben was born on 27 September 1907 in Žatec in Bohemia, Austria-Hungary. She was the middle of three daughters of the owner of a printing shop who died when she was 10. After World War I, the Sudetenland became part of the newly founded Czechoslovakia. In 1945, at the end of World War II, she and her husband Ernst Gottfried Treben were expelled from Czechoslovakia. For several years they lived in refugee camps until they found refuge in Austria and settled down in Grieskirchen in 1951.

== Career and later life ==
Treben became famous through her two books: Health Through God's Pharmacy and Maria Treben's Cures. The first was translated into 24 languages and sold over 8 million copies.

Treben addressed seminars and presented at natural health conferences in Germany, Austria and across Europe, attracting hundreds of people. She is perceived as a pioneer of the renewed interest for natural remedies and traditional medicine at the end of the 20th century.

Treben died on 26 July 1991 in Grieskirchen.

== Remedies ==
Treben used traditional German and Eastern European remedies handed down from previous generations. She only used local herbs and always accompanied her remedies with advice on diet. She commonly used Thyme, Greater Celandine, Ramsons, Speedwell, Calamus, Camomile, Nettle and Lady's Mantle. She treated a broad range of conditions from psoriasis to constipation and diabetes to insomnia. She used her own recipes as well as traditional healing remedies like Swedish bitters that she used as a cure-all. Some of her remedies and advice proved to be controversial, such as some of the more esoteric ingredients used in the greater Swedish bitters recipe ^{[which?]}. To this day she is widely read and referred to for her knowledge of European medicinal herbs.

== Works ==
- Gesundheit aus der Apotheke Gottes - Ratschläge und Erfahrungen mit Heilkräutern, Verlag Wilhelm Ennsthaler, Steyr, 1980, ISBN 3-85068-090-8
- Maria Treben's Heilerfolge - Briefe und Berichte von Heilerfolgen, Verlag Wilhelm Ennsthaler, Steyr, 1980, ISBN 3-85068-082-7
- Allergien - vorbeugen - erkennen - heilen / Gesund mit Maria Treben, Ennsthaler (auch bei Heyne, München)
- Streß im Alltag. Vorbeugen, erkennen, heilen. München: Heyne, 1990, ISBN 3-453-03867-3
