= Vicario =

Vicario is a surname. Notable people with the surname include:

- Enzo Vicario (born 1942), Italian bobsledder
- Guglielmo Vicario (born 1996), Italian footballer
- Jaron Vicario (born 1999), Italian footballer
- Leona Vicario (1789–1842), Mexican revolutionary
- Marco Vicario (1925–2020), Italian film actor, screenwriter, producer and director
- Margherita Vicario (born 1988), Italian singer, songwriter and actress

== See also ==
- Arantxa Sánchez Vicario, Spanish tennis player
- El Vicario, winery in Spain
