= Amaro Averna =

Italian digestif

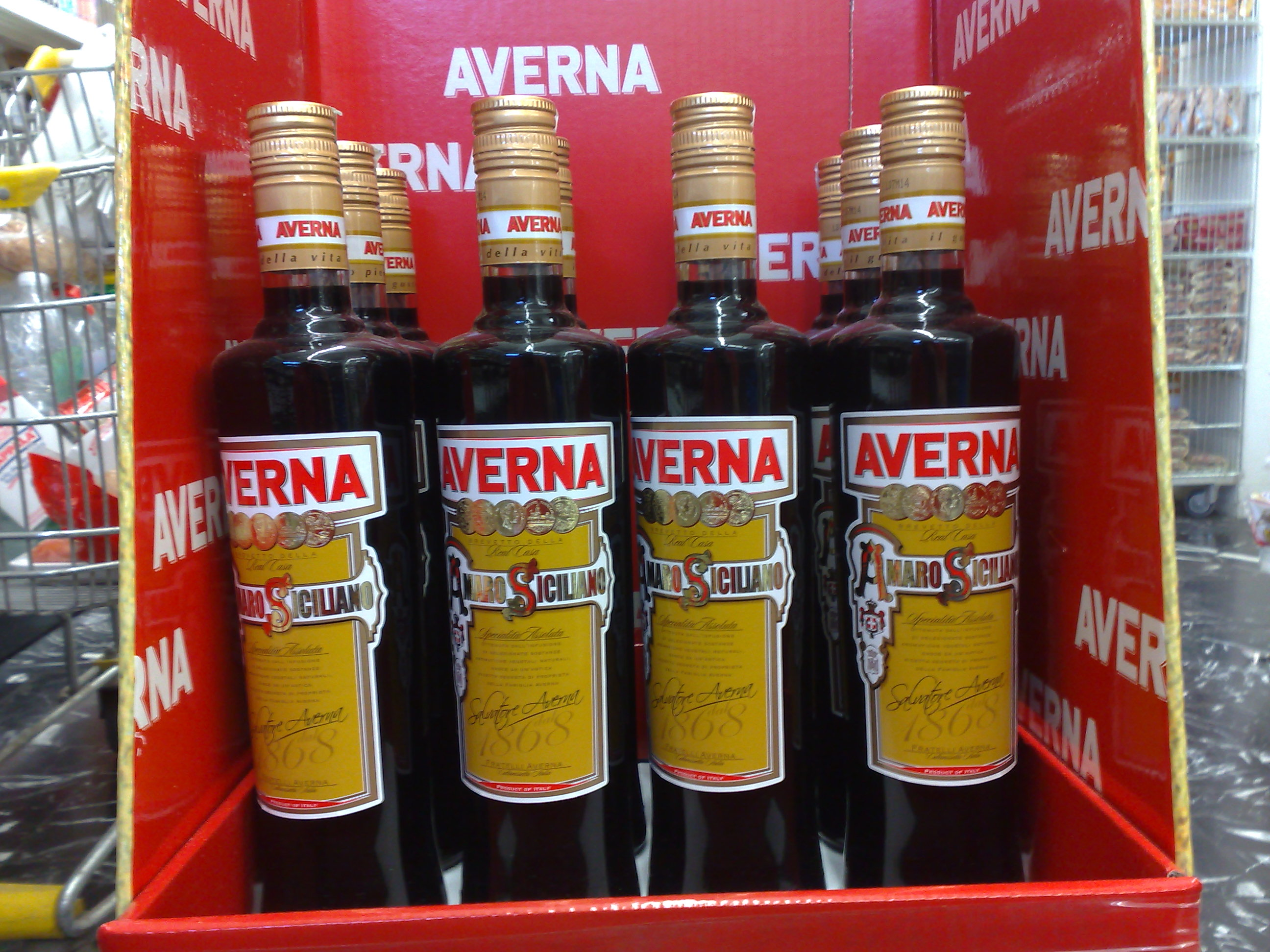
- Type: Liquor
- Origin: Italy
- Alcohol by volume: 29%
- Colour: Dark brown

Amaro Averna is an Italian liqueur in the amaro category produced in Caltanissetta, Italy. It is named after its inventor, Salvatore Averna, who invented the recipe in 1868. This drink is produced on the Island of Sicily and is considered a traditional drink. The Averna company was acquired in 2014 by Gruppo Campari. In May 2026, Gruppo Campari sold Amaro Averna to Disaronno Group.

== History ==
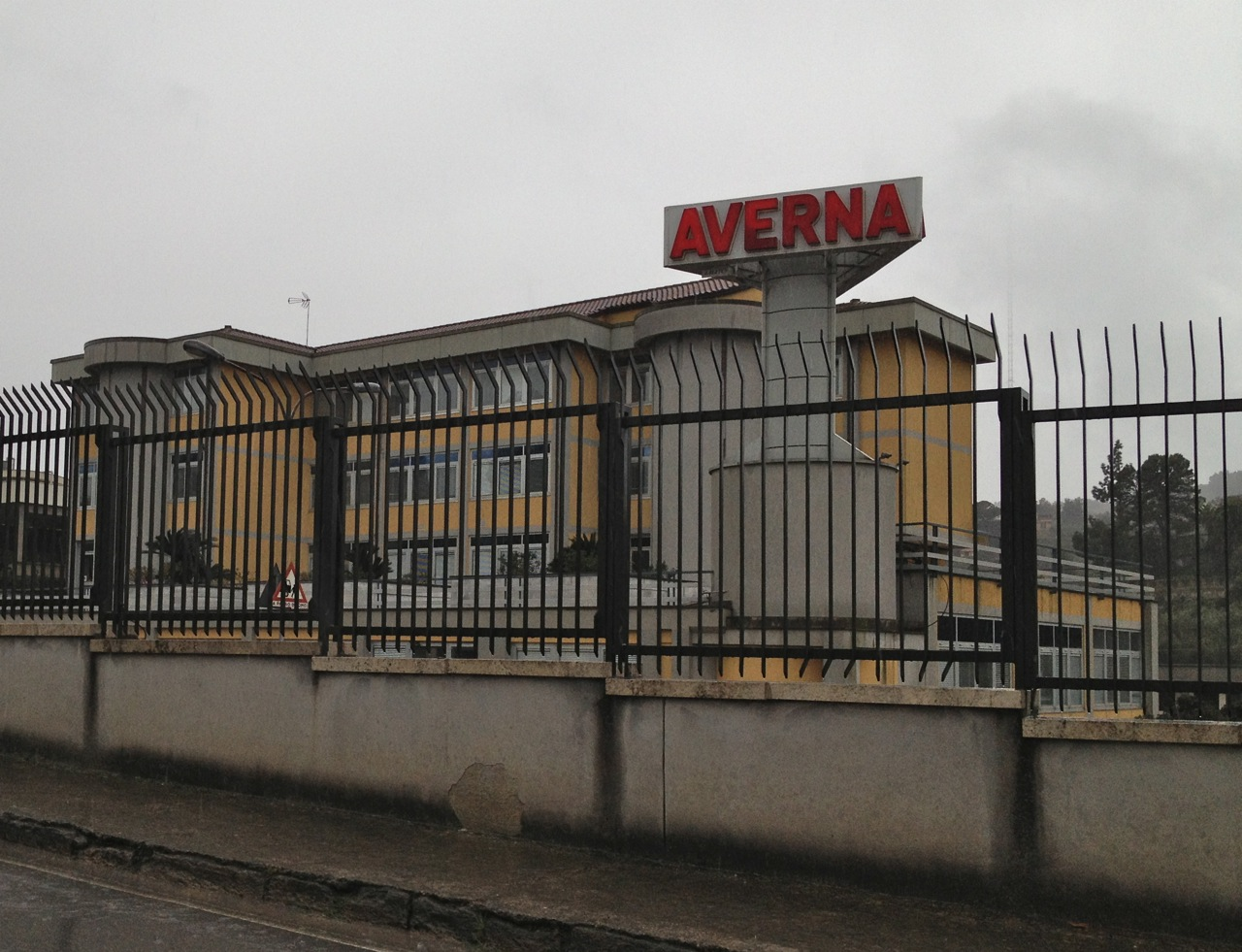
Ex Fratelli Averna factory buildings (now in disuse) in Caltanissetta, Sicily

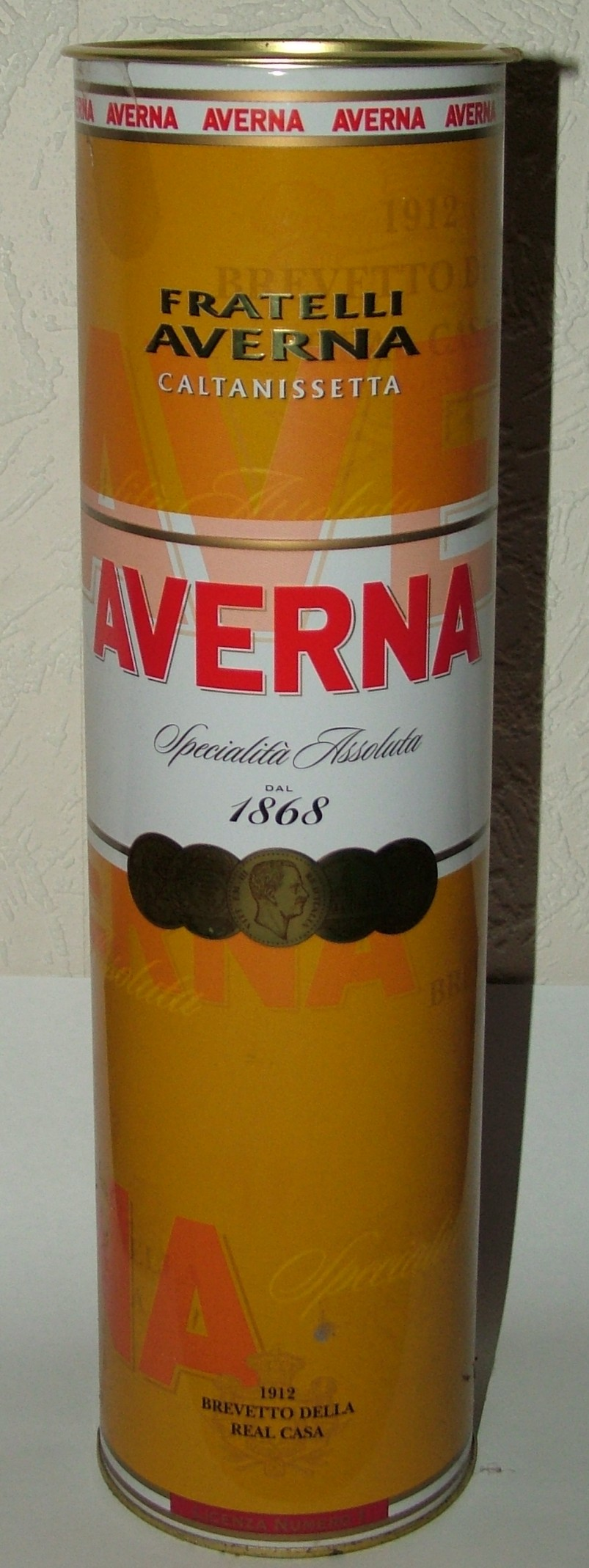
Amaro Averna

Salvatore Averna was born in 1802 into a family of drapers. Growing up in Caltanissetta, he became one of the most active members of the community, a justice of the peace and benefactor of the Abbey of the Holy Spirit. Here, following an ancient tradition born in the fortified Benedictine abbeys and spread to Europe through the Cluniac and Cistercian monasteries, the monks produced an elixir of herbs that was pleasant despite being "bitter", and was popularly thought to possess tonic and therapeutic properties. In 1859, as a token of gratitude, fray Girolamo, prior de la Abadía de Santo Spirito gave Salvatore the recipe for the infusion. In 1868 he began producing Averna for guests at his home.

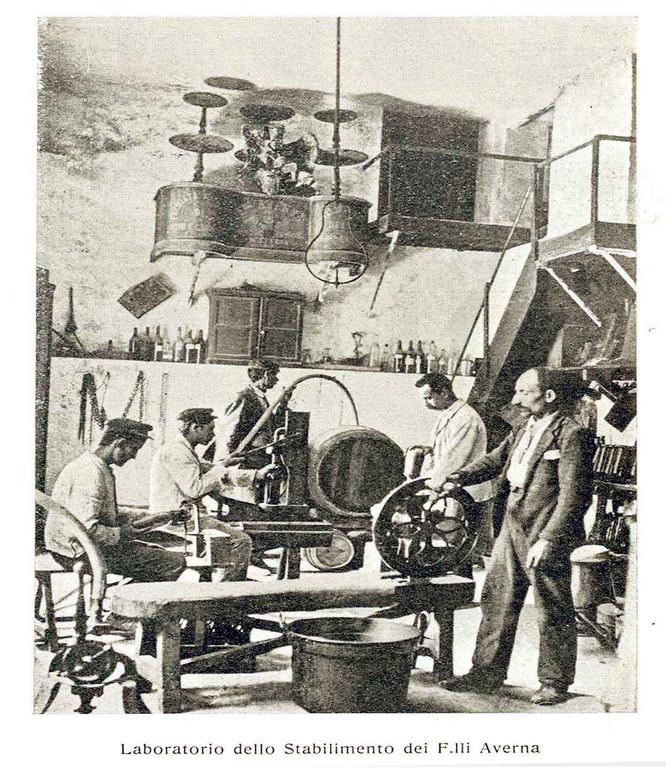
Fratelli Averna, Caltanisetta, 1911

It was Francesco Averna, son of Salvatore, who took the initiative to promote the bitter, participating in various exhibitions in Italy and abroad. During a private visit of King Umberto I in 1895, Francesco received a gold pin with the House of Savoy insignia in recognition of the Sicilian bitter, which by now was well known. In 1912 Victor Emmanuel III granted the Averna Company the right to affix the royal crest on the label of their liquor with the words "Patent of the Royal House": the Averna Company became supplier to the royal household. All these awards led Francesco to redesign the label, incorporating all its certificates and prizes. After the untimely death of Francesco, his wife Anna Maria took over the company.

The third generation, Francesco's sons Salvatore, Paolo, Emilio and Michele consolidated the firm's success and contributed to its evolution, despite all the difficulties arising from two world wars, to such an extent that the company was able to continue production without interruption, even succeeding in starting an export business to America. In 1958 the Averna Company became a public corporation (Fratelli Averna S.p.A.). Some years later a new factory was built.

1978 was a very significant year in the company's history: after 110 years and three generations a family craft product become a major company in the Italian market. Since 1978, the fourth generation of Averna has maintained that position in the market, further consolidating it through product diversification: the "Averna Group" now includes the Villa Frattina winery producing still and sparkling wines. In the last decade, consolidation within the domestic market has been accompanied by an intense internationalization effort that has seen growing development in foreign markets.

In 2014, the Campari Group acquired 100% of Fratelli Averna. The transaction was worth €103,750,000, made up of a price of €98 million and a net financial debt of €5.75 million.

In June 2026, Campari Group finalized an agreement to sell the 100% of the Averna brand, along with Zedda Piras, to Illva Saronno Holding (through its subsidiary Disaronno Ingredients). Following the completion of the transaction, the ownership and global distribution of the Amaro Averna passed to the Saronno-based group.

== Overview ==
The herbs, roots and citrus rinds are allowed to soak in the base liquor before caramel is added. Averna is sweet, thick and has a gentle herbal bitterness. It is 29% alc/volume (formerly 32%) and it is bottled in Italy. Averna is a classic digestif, often served on the rocks or neat. It also is an ingredient in some cocktails.

Traditional herbal medicine was cultivated in the monastery, so according to the manufacturer, the use of Mediterranean herbs is typical for the recipe. Herbs, roots and spices as well as pomegranates and essential oils from bitter oranges and lemons are collected, mixed and crushed. In the subsequent maceration, the ingredients are doused with pure alcohol and give off their aromas and flavors to it. If the intensity of taste and smell is right, the mixture is reduced to drinking strength and bottled. According to the manufacturer, the recipe has not changed since 1868.
