= Amaro (liqueur) =

Italian herbal liqueur

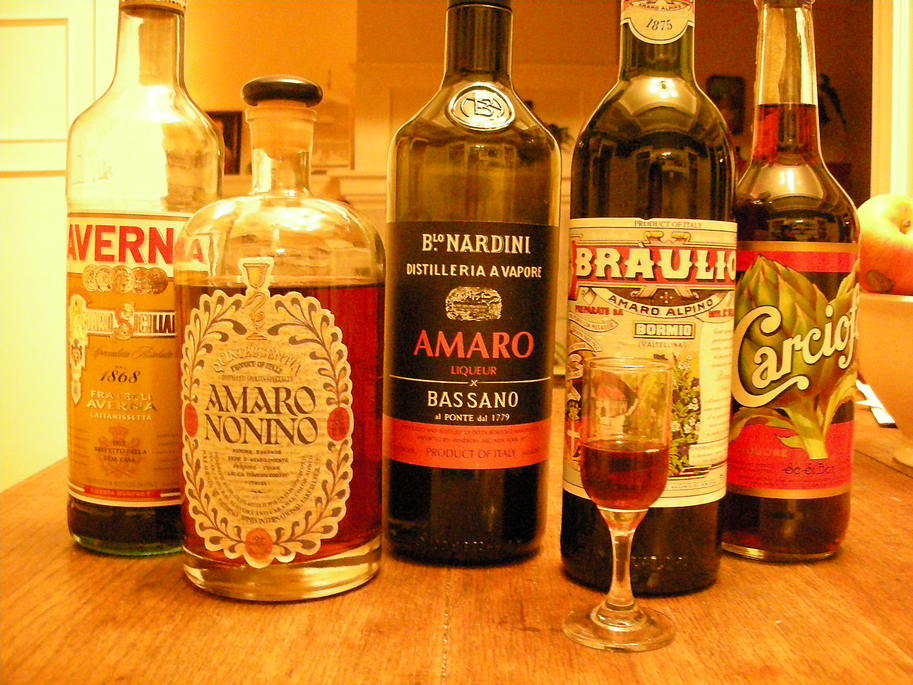
Several bottles of amaro

Amaro (Italian for 'bitter'); pl. amari) is a type of Italian (or Italian-style) herbal liqueur that is commonly consumed as an after-dinner digestif. It usually has a bitter-sweet flavor, sometimes syrupy, and has an alcohol content between 16% and 40%.

Amaro is typically produced by macerating herbs, roots, flowers, bark, vegetables and/or citrus peels in wine and/or a grape-based distillate such as grappa, mixing the filtrate with caramel syrup, and optionally allowing the mixture to age in casks or bottles. However, there is no canonical definition of what is or is not an amaro.

In the United States, the Tax and Trade Bureau classifies what is colloquially known as amari as aromatized wines per 27 CFR 4.21(g). Similarly, spirits-based amari are classified simply as bitters. Internationally, the Harmonized System only recognizes spirits-based bitters (as 2208.90.10.00) and aromatized wine (as 2205.10.60 or 2205.90.60 depending on container volume).

Dozens of varieties of amaro are commercially produced, the most commonly available of which are Fernet-Branca, Averna, Ramazzotti, Lucano, Amaro Nonino, and Montenegro. Many commercial bottlers trace their recipe or production to the 19th century or earlier. Recipes often originated in monasteries or pharmacies.

Amaro is traditionally consumed neat, sometimes with a citrus wedge. It may also be consumed on ice, with tonic water in cola-flavored sodas (as is common in Argentina) or in a variety of classic and modern cocktails.

== Flavourings ==
Amaro is flavored with several (sometimes several dozen) herbs and roots. Some producers list their ingredients in detail on the bottle label. Herbs used for flavouring may include any of the following: gentian, angelica, cardoon, cinchona (china), lemon balm (melissa), lemon verbena (cedrina), juniper, anise, fennel, zedoary, ginger, mint, thyme, sage, bay laurel, citrus peels, liquorice, cinnamon, menthol, cardamom, saffron, rue (ruta), and wormwood (assenzio).

== Brands ==
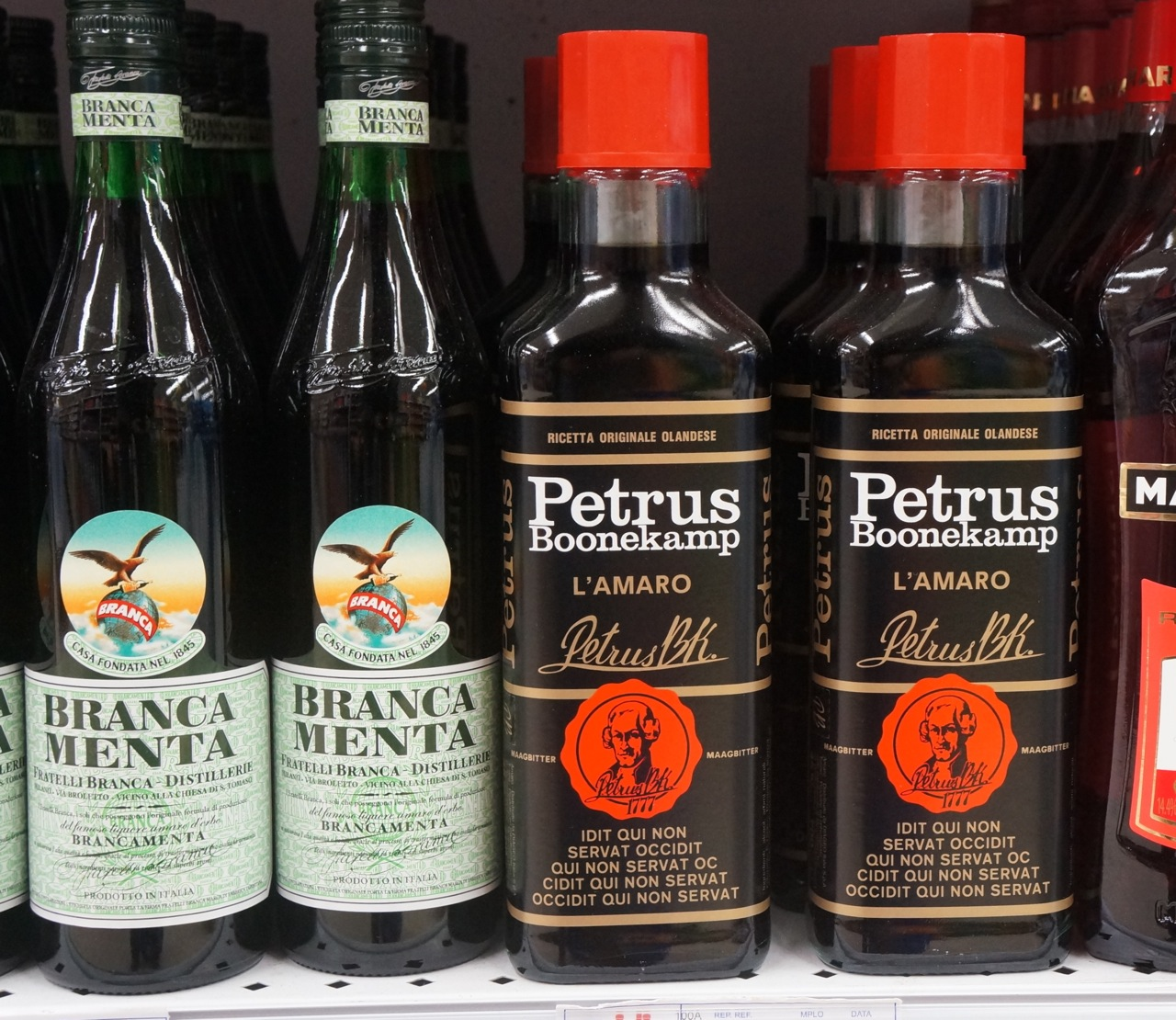
Bottles of Branca Menta and Petrus Boonekamp

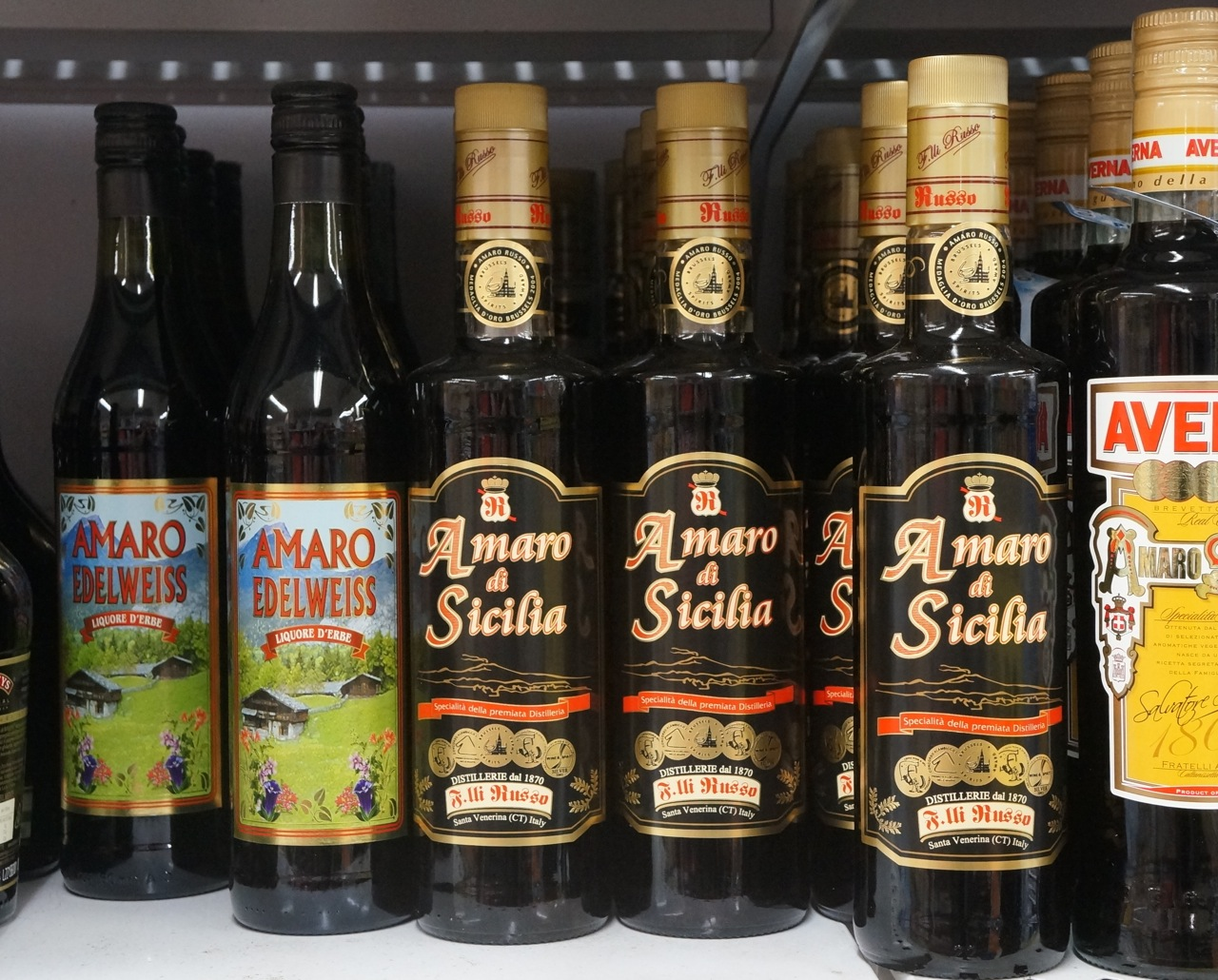
Bottles of Amaro Edelweiss, Amaro di Sicilia, and Amaro Averna

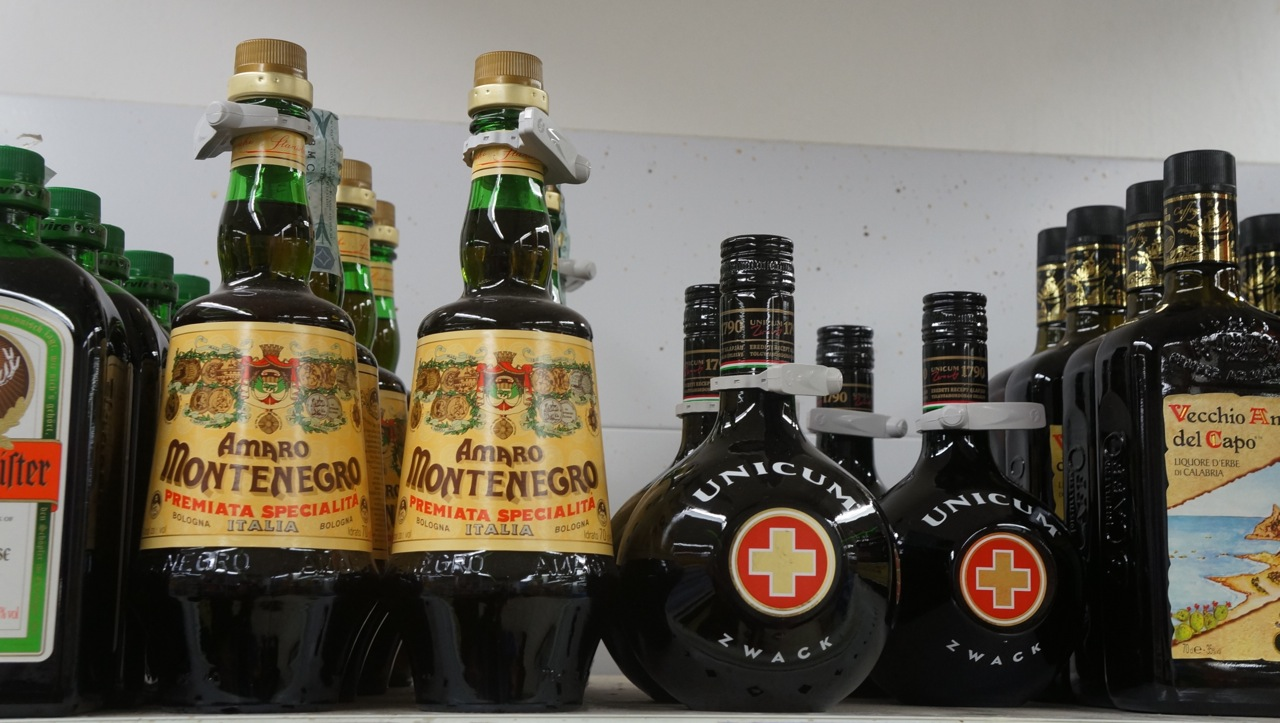
Bottles of Amaro Montenegro, Unicum, and Vecchio Amaro del Capo

The following is a list of some of the notable commercial brands:

=== Italy ===
- Amaro Rupes
- Amaro Averna
- Amaro Lucano
- Amaro Amarischia
- Amaro Montenegro
- Amaro San Simone
- Amaro Camatti
- Amaro Ramazzotti
- Amaro Sibilla
- Cynar
- Fernet-Branca
- Nardini Amaro Bassano
- Nonino
- Vecchio Amaro del Capo
- Zucca
- Varnelli Amaro Dell'Erborista
- Amara Amaro
- Amaro Jefferson
- Amaro Dente Di Leone
- Amaro Hàntak
- Amaro Tarantino
- See the Elephant Amaro

=== Elsewhere ===
- Amaro 1716 Gustavia
- Amaro 1716 Café du Soir
- Appenzeller Alpenbitter
- Bassa Baviera (Bavaria)
- Brucato Amaro
- Becherovka
- Fernet Stock
- Boonekamp
- Calisaya
- Cinpatrazzo
- Don Ciccio & Figli
- Gran Classico Bitter
- Jägermeister
- J. Rieger & Co. Caffe Amaro
- Malort
- Pelinkovac
- Unicum
- Vigo Amaro
- Vicario
