= Swedish bitters =

Bitter herb in Sweden and Austria

Bottle label

Swedish bitters, also called Swedish tincture, is a bitter and a traditional herbal tonic, the use of which dates back to the 15th century.

== Origins ==
Swedish bitters is said to have been formulated in a similar way to ancient bitters by Paracelsus and rediscovered by 18th century Swedish medics Dr. Klaus Samst and Dr. Urban Hjärne, though this appears to be mistaking the latter for his son, Kristian Henrik Hjärne, who himself invented a bitter.

In modern times, Swedish bitters have been popularized by Maria Treben, an Austrian herbalist. The tonic is claimed to cure a large number of ailments, and to aid digestion. These claims are presented with little in the way of scientific evidence to support them, though empirical evidence provides for a very large database of positive results.

== Components ==
The alcoholic Swedish bitters is purported to have a similar flavor to Angostura bitters, though perhaps drier. Nowadays, it is more common to prepare Swedish bitters from a dry herbs mixture

== Ingredients ==
The following herbs are added to alcohol to make Swedish bitters:

- aloe as active ingredient
- water extract of the following herbs:
  - angelica root (Angelica archangelica)
  - camphor (Cinnamomum camphora)
  - carline thistle root (Carlina acaulis)
  - manna (Fraxinus ornus)
  - myrrh
  - rhubarb root (Rheum palmatum)
  - saffron
  - senna (Senna alexandrina)
  - theriac venetian (theriac) (a mixture of many herbs and other substances)
  - zedoary root (Curcuma zedoaria)

There are variations on this recipe and herbal shops supply alcoholic and non-alcoholic versions of the drink.

Maria Treben's book contains nine pages on this bitter, with a description of many ailments and their cures.
