= Braulio (liqueur) =

Italian herbal liqueur

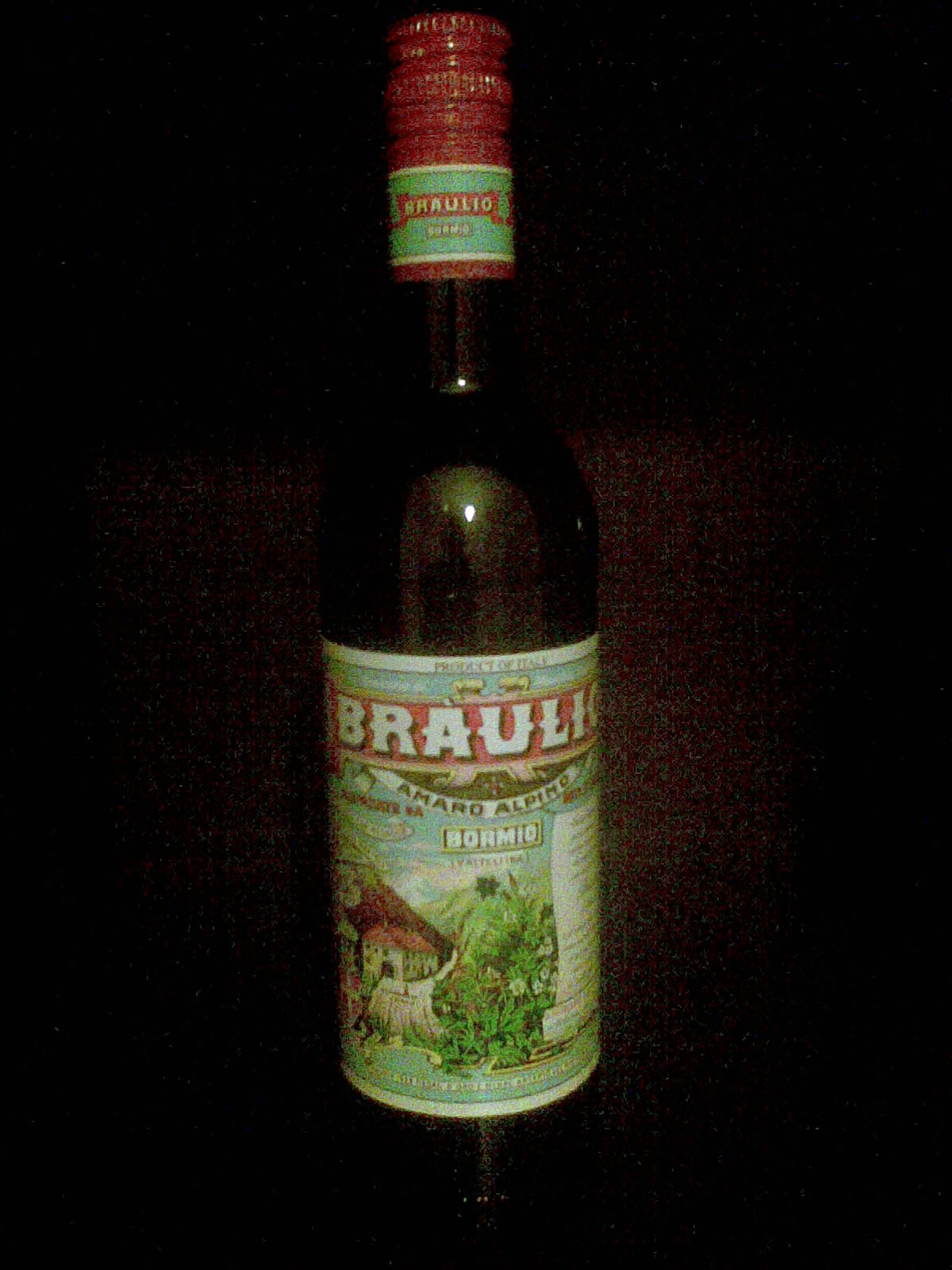
A bottle of Braulio.

Braulio is a type of amaro, a digestive herbal liquor from Alps, typical of Valtelline (Italy). It is typically served cold or at room temperature, though it is also occasionally served as an aperitif with sparkling white wine.

== History ==
The original recipe dates to 1826, conceived by Francesco Peloni, a pharmacist and botanist of Bormio who studied the beneficial properties of various local herbs. Production of Braulio began in 1875.

Since 1999, the amaro has been a property of Casoni Liquori S.p.A., a company based in Finale Emilia (Italy), although production continues at the Peloni family farms in Bormio.

The trademark is held by Fratelli Averna S.p.A., acquired in 2014 by the Campari Group.

== Production ==
The main ingredients of Braulio are medicinal herbs, fruits, roots and berries that, at least originally, were collected on the slopes of the Braulio Valley.

The liqueur is aged for two years in casks of Slavonian oak.

Another reserve named the Braulio Reserve is aged for three years and produced in very limited quantities. It has a decidedly stronger flavor.

== Related ==
- Bormio
- Stelvio Pass
