= Amaro Lucano =

Italian herbal liqueur

Coordinates: 40.4188786°N 16.5471315°E

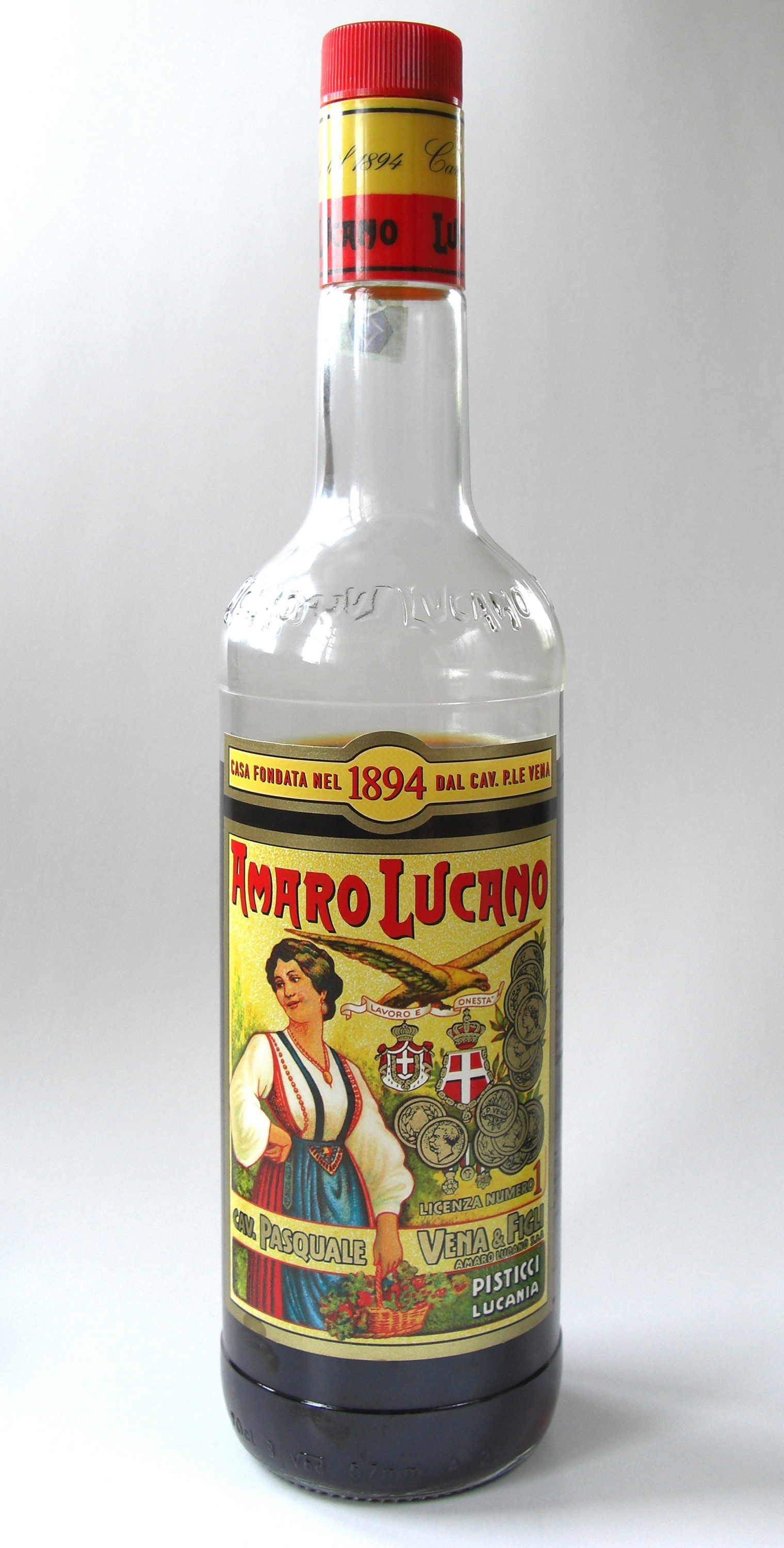
- Type: Liqueur
- Manufacturer: Amaro Lucano S.p.A.
- Origin: Pisticci, Basilicata, Italy
- Introduced: 1894
- Alcohol by volume: 28.0%
- Proof (US): 56 Proof
- Website: www.amarolucano.it

Amaro Lucano is an Italian herbal liqueur belonging to the amaro category. It is produced by Amaro Lucano S.p.A., a family-owned company based in Pisticci, Basilicata, Italy. The adjective "Lucano" derives from Lucania, another name by which Basilicata is known.

== History ==
The recipe was created in 1894 by Pasquale Vena, a pastry chef who blended more than 30 herbs. The secret recipe has been passed from generation to generation in the Vena family. In 1900, Amaro Lucano gained fame throughout the Kingdom of Italy when the Vena family became the official supplier to the House of Savoy, whose coat of arms appears on the label.

After a period of recession during World War II, in 1950 the workshop became an industrial enterprise under the management of Vena's sons, Leonardo and Giuseppe. Subsequently, in 1965, a new factory was opened in the frazione (hamlet) of Pisticci Scalo.

In the 1970s, the Vena family also began producing other alcohol-based drinks under the "Lucano" brand name, including sambuca, limoncello and coffee varieties, as well as liqueur-filled chocolates.

== The making of Amaro Lucano ==
The process of preparing Amaro Lucano is divided into seven steps: the selection, the infusion, the processing, the secret, the control, the mixture, and the bottling.

=== The selection ===
The herbs needed for the mixture come from different areas of the world. They are dried naturally, crushed and mixed together. Among the herbs used, there are:

- Artemisia absinthium
- Artemisia pontica
- Salvia sclarea (Clavy Sage)
- Musk yarrow
- Cnicus (Holy Thistle)
- Bitter orange
- Gentiana
- Angelica
- Sambucus elderberry
- Ruta
- Aloe
- Cinnamon essential oil

=== The infusion ===
The mixture is steeped in solutions of pure alcohol and water; it then goes through a hot infusion process in thermo-controlled baths (55°/60 °C) overnight.

=== The processing ===
The mixture undergoes hot pressing to obtain an infusion.

=== The secret ===
Once the infusion is ready, the family secret ingredient is added to obtain the extract.

=== The control ===
Laboratory tests are run; the extract is aged for a period of five months. During the aging process, there is stratification, which means that heavy components are on the bottom, while lighter components are on the top. The "heart" of the extract is the one kept.

=== The mixture ===
Pure alcohol, essential oils, water, the aged extract, sugar, caramel and water are mixed in a large tank to get a hydro-alcoholic solution.

=== The bottling line ===
The mixture is then filtered, bottled and ready to be sold.

== Overview ==
Amaro Lucano is caramel brown in colour, has a bittersweet flavour, and its strength is 28% alc/vol. It can be savoured neat, chilled, with ice or orange zest. It is usually served as a digestif after a meal and also as a base for cocktails.

== Cocktails ==
Amaro Lucano is used as an apéritif and digestif, after-dinner drink, and all-day drink. It is used in cocktails such as Italian Sangria, Gelato Lucano, Amarcord.

== Other products ==
- Caffè Lucano
- Sambuca Lucano
- Limoncello Lucano
- Vitae
- Barocca
- Amante
- I vitigni del sud
- Passione bianca

== Awards ==
- Gold medal at the San Francisco World Spirits Competition 2014
- Three stars at the Superior Taste Award 2014
- Silver Medal (Gold Medal for the Caffè Lucano) at the Concours Mondial de Bruxelles, Brussels
