= Ramazzotti (liqueur) =

Italian digestive liqueur

Coordinates: 44.7136081°N 8.2869242°E

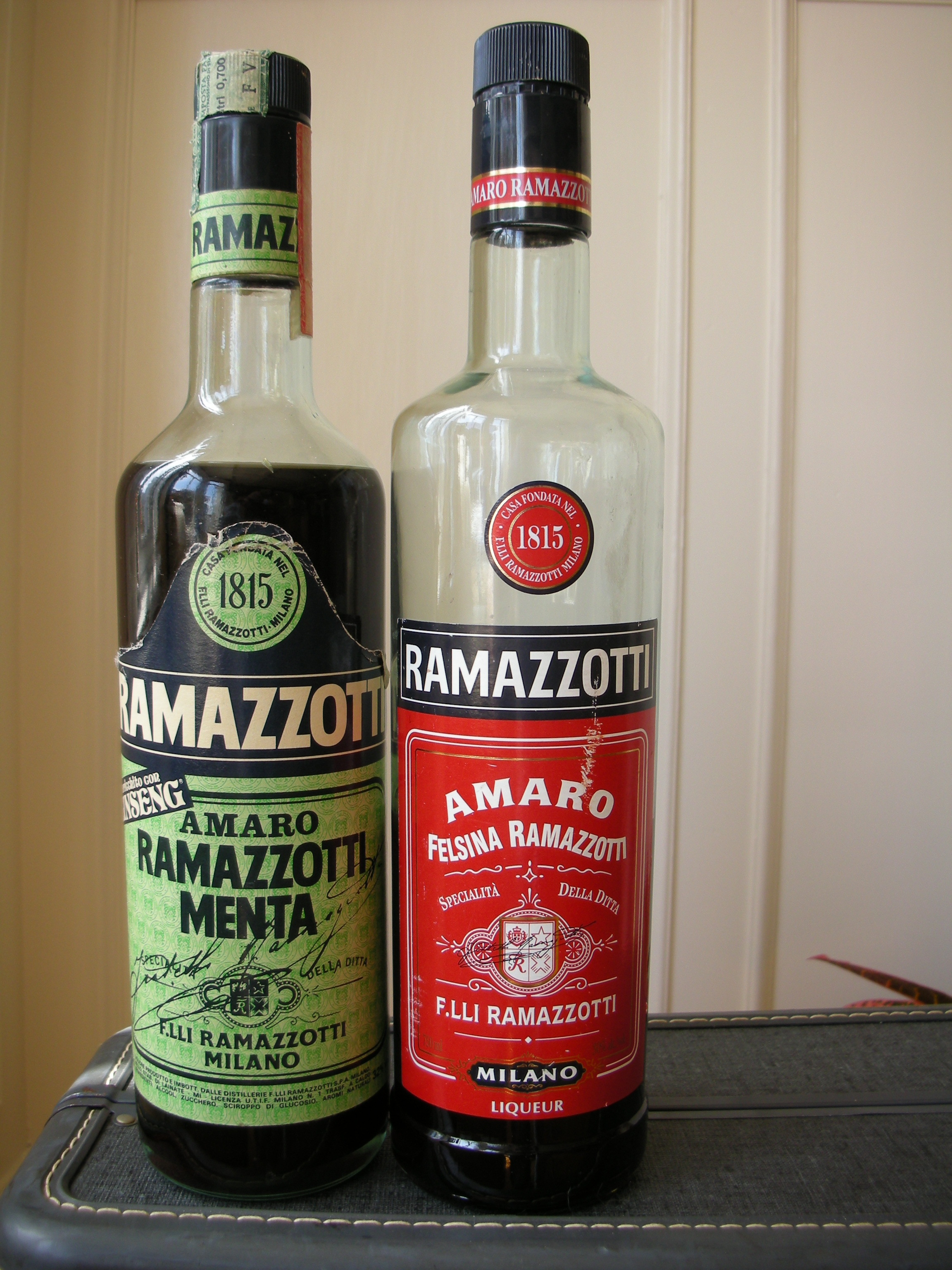

Ramazzotti is an Italian digestivo bitter liqueur amaro, bottled at 30% alcohol by volume. It is bottled in Canelli by Pernod Ricard.

== History ==
Ausano Ramazzotti (1791–1866), a Bolognese pharmacist, first produced his "Amaro Felsina Ramazzotti" in Milan in 1815. It was the first aperitif not based on wine. In 1848, Ramazzotti opened a bar on the Via Santa Margherita where he started serving his amaro.

In 1985, the company was acquired by the French multinational Pernod-Ricard. In 1994, the factory at Lainate closed and production was moved to Canelli in Asti.

== Description ==
Ramazzotti amaro is still produced according to the original recipe of 1815, including the maceration of at least 33 varieties of roots and herbs. Among the principal ingredients are orange peel from Sicily, star anise, cardamom and cloves, which are ground to powder and mixed with caramelised sugar and alcohol. The classic version contains 30% alcohol while Ramazzotti Menta contains 32%.

It was verified as kosher in 2012.

== Serving ==
The amaro is normally drunk straight or with ice as a post-meal digestif. It can also be served as an aperitif with soda water and a slice of lemon.

A number of cocktails use Amaro Ramazzotti, including:

- High Tea in Milan, which also includes Amaro Lucarno, Cynar, lemon juice and tonic water.
- Friar Minor, which mixes it with orange juice and soda water.

== See also ==
Media related to Amaro Ramazzotti at Wikimedia Commons
