= Amaro Montenegro =

Italian amaro

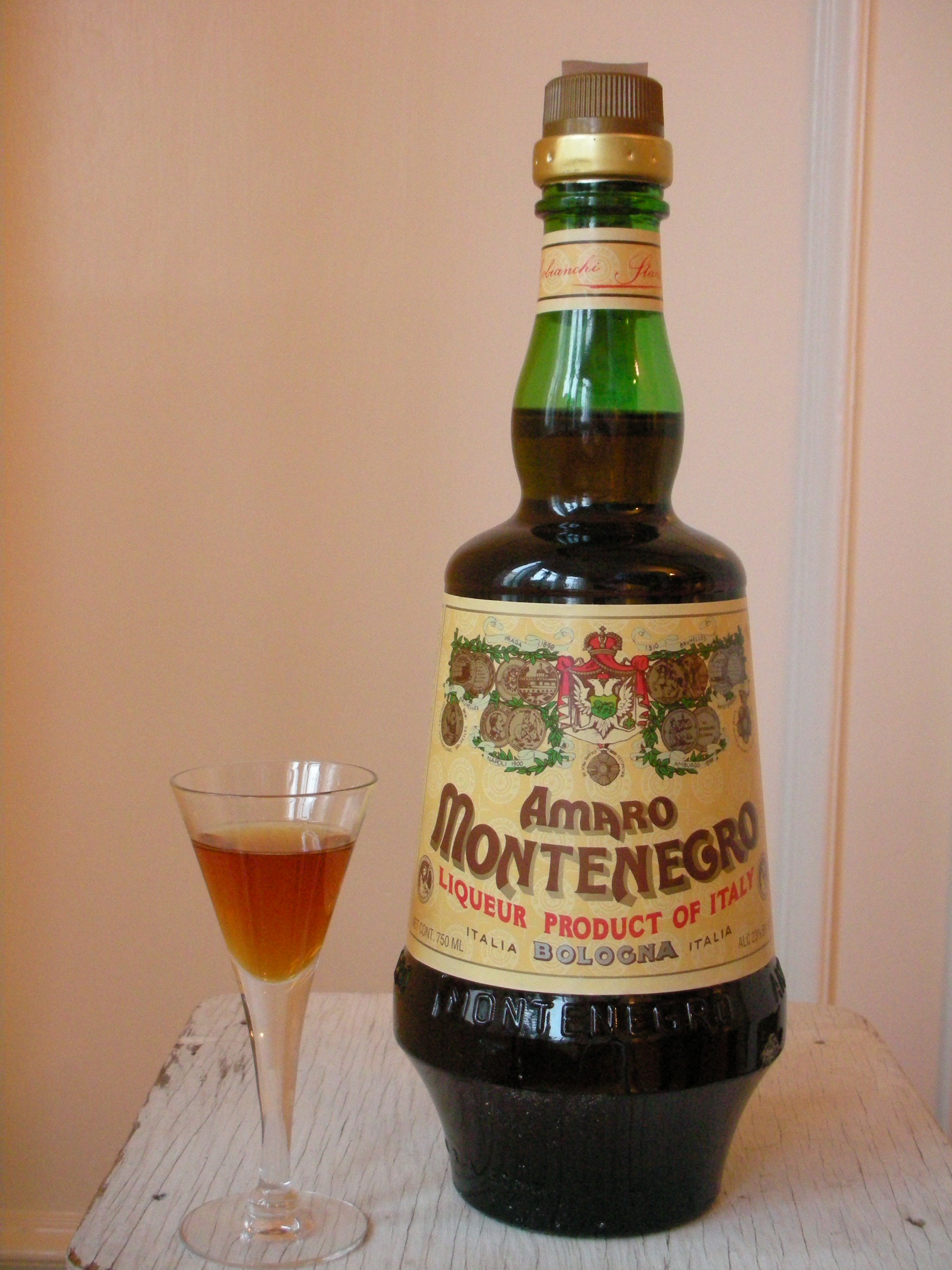
- A bottle of Amaro Montenegro
- Type: Amaro
- Origin: Italy
- Alcohol by volume: 23%
- Proof (US): 46
- Colour: Brown
- Flavour: Bitter, spicy, herbaceous and floral
- Website: amaromontenegro.com

Amaro Montenegro is an Italian amaro distilled in Bologna, Italy. It is made from a proprietary blend of 40 botanicals including vanilla, orange peels and eucalyptus. The amaro was first produced by Stanislao Cobianchi in 1885 and was originally called Elisir Lungavita. In 1896, it was renamed Amaro Montenegro, after Princess Elena of Montenegro who married Crown Prince Victor Emmanuel, the future King Victor Emmanuel III of Italy. Its production takes place in the factory of San Lazzaro di Savena, in the province of Bologna, of Montenegro S.r.l.

The Italian writer Gabriele D'Annunzio once described it as the "liqueur of virtues".
