= El Vicario =

Spanish wine region

Coordinates: 39°02′33.2″N 3°01′11.7″W

Pago Vicario
- Wine region
- Pago Vicario lies geographically within the La Mancha DOP in the province of Ciudad Real in the region of Castilla–La Mancha
- Official name: Denominación de Origen Protegida Pago Vicario / Vino de Pago Vicario
- Type: Denominación de Origen Protegida (DOP) / Vino de Pago (VP)
- Year established: 2019
- Country: Spain
- Size of planted vineyards: 130 hectares (321 acres)
- Varietals produced: Red: Tempranillo, Garnacha, Graciano, Cabernet Sauvignon, Merlot, Syrah, Petit Verdot. Whites: Sauvignon Blanc, Chardonnay
- No. of wineries: 1

Pago Vicario is a Spanish winery in Castilla–La Mancha, Spain. The winery uses the Vino de Pago wine appellation, a classification for Spanish wine applied to individual vineyards or wine estates, unlike the Denominación de Origen Protegida (DOP) or Denominación de Origen Calificada (DOCa) which is applied to an entire wine region. The Pago Vicario winery was formed as a Vino de Pago in 2019, and geographically it lies within the extent of the La Mancha DOP.
