= Schrobbelèr =

Dutch herbal liqueur

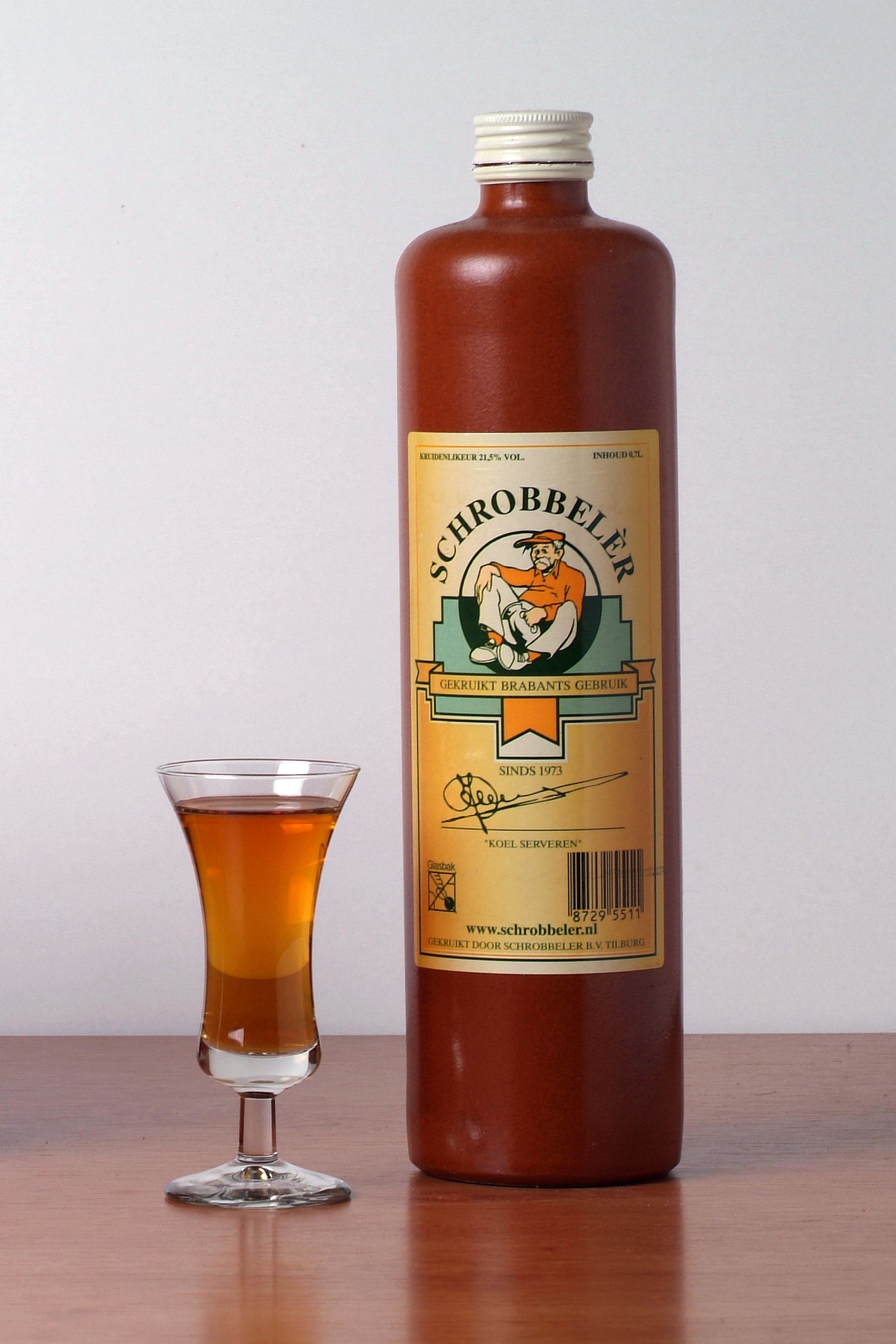
Schrobbelèr

Schrobbelèr is a Dutch herbal liqueur, made by Jonkers Distillers B.V. in Tilburg. In the United States and Australia, it is sold under the brand name Jans because English-speaking people have great difficulty with the pronunciation of the consonant sequence "schr".

== History ==
Entrepreneur Jan Wassing (1930–1981) from Tilburg suffered from a weak stomach. Therefore, he used to make his own mixed drink for celebrating Carnival. This brown coloured mixture had a relatively low alcohol content. Since 1973, Wassing also served this mixture to friends in his home bar. In 1978, Jan took a more professional approach to his favourite drink. Local distiller and liquor retailer Isidorus Jonkers (1931–2016) was asked to make an accurate ingredient analysis of the mixture and to draw up a matching herbal recipe. The drink was then taken into production in the small distillery, located in the garage behind the Jonkers liquor store. Since 2004, the product is made in a modern distillery on an industrial park in Tilburg. As from 2010 this distillery is owned by Pieter-Jan Wassing, the son of Jan Wassing.

== Brand name and label ==
Jan Wassing's home bar was called "Bij den schrobbelaar" (At the wool carding shop). Therefore, Wassing decided to sell his product under the brand name "Schrobbelèr" (Wool carder). The label of the brand shows a traditional wool carding worker. Until the mid 1960s, the wool cloth and blanket industry was very important in Tilburg. Pieter-Jan Wassing is responsible for putting a story into circulation that Schrobbelèr is based on a recipe with 43 different kinds of herbs. This claim is strikingly similar to that of Licor 43, a Spanish liqueur that is also said to contain 43 kinds of herbs.

== Packaging ==
Schrobbelèr is sold in stone bottles. In the 17th and 18th century, (human) urine was used as a scouring solvent for sheared wool. Legend says that people from Tilburg collected their urine in stone jugs and bottles and sold it to local wool cloth manufacturers. During Carnival celebrations, right before the Lent season, Tilburg is mockingly referred to as "kruikenstad" (jug town) while the inhabitants call themselves "kruikenzeikers" (jug pissers). Consumption of Schrobbelèr in Tilburg reaches its highest peak during Carnival. The stone Schrobbelèr bottle reminds Tilburg inhabitants of their peculiar nickname and demonstrates their hometown pride.
