= Calisaya (liqueur) =

Herbal liqueur

Calisaya is a herbal liqueur produced by infusing cinchona calisaya, and other barks, roots and flowers in grain neutral spirit and Seville orange extract. It is a contemporary revision of the classic Italian amaro. It is handcrafted in small numbered batches by Elixir, Inc., a craft distillery in Eugene, Oregon, which was founded by the Italian brothers Andrea and Mario Loreto.

It can be drunk as both an apéritif and digestif or used as a bitter ingredient in cocktails.

Cinchona based liqueurs are very popular in Italy under the generic name of China (pronounced Kee-nah), the Italian name of cinchona. They also were popular in the US before Prohibition, where calisaya was the generic name of any cinchona based liqueur or bitters and was used as an ingredient or bitter in several cocktail recipes. After Prohibition, calisaya liqueurs disappeared from the US market until Elixir, Inc. reconstructed the liqueur and trademarked the name Calisaya.
