= Redroot =

Redroot is the common name of some plants:

- Ceanothus americanus, aka New Jersey tea, Jersey tea ceanothus, mountain sweet, wild snowball
- Lachnanthes, aka Carolina redroot
- Sanguinaria, aka bloodroot, bloodwort, red puccoon

== See also ==
- Red-rood, a species of dogwood
