= Zucca (apéritif) =

Italian aperitif

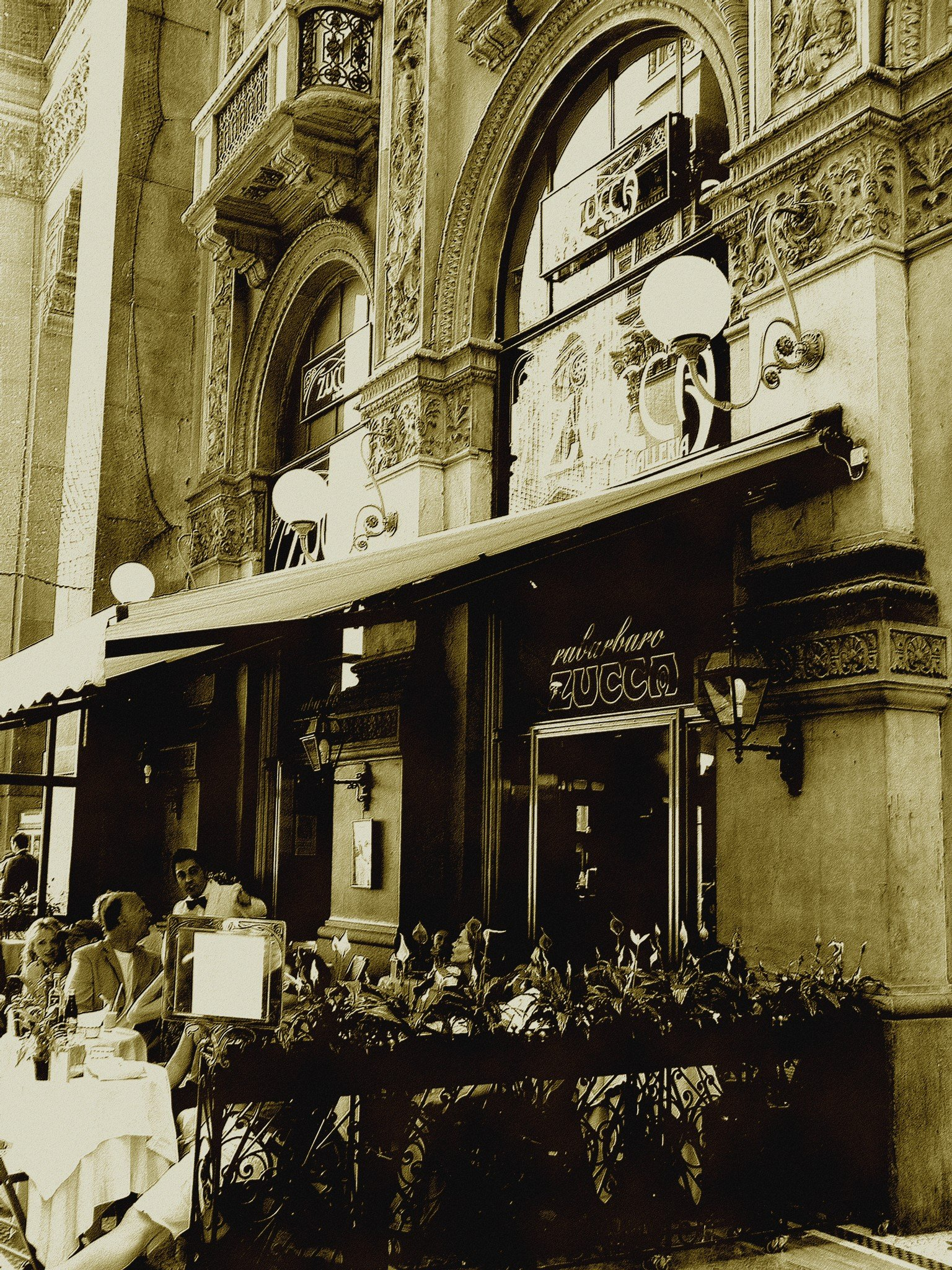
Caffè Zucca in Galleria Vittorio Emanuele, Milan

Zucca (Italian pronunciation: [ˈdzukka; ˈtsukka]) is a commercial Italian aperitif. Although zucca is the Italian word for "squash" or "pumpkin", it actually takes its name after Zucca's bar (Caffè Zucca), located in the Galleria Vittorio Emanuele II in Milan. Its base ingredient is in fact Chinese rhubarb (hence its longer name Rabarbaro Zucca), also combined with zest, cardamom seeds and other curative herbs. The liqueur has a delicate and pleasant bittersweet taste and is often mixed with soda water and ice.

Zucca is closely related to other traditional Italian aperitifs, such as Campari, Punt e Mes, and Cynar, as it is relatively light, with a 30% volume in alcohol.

Zucca is owned by the same company that produces Amaretto Di Saronno. Despite this, it is difficult to find commercially in North America. However, it enjoys a certain amount of prominence as the featured drink at the Caffè Zucca in Milan, the bar where Gaspare Campari first introduced his alcoholic infusion of herbs in the 1860s.
