= Blutwurz =

German liqueur

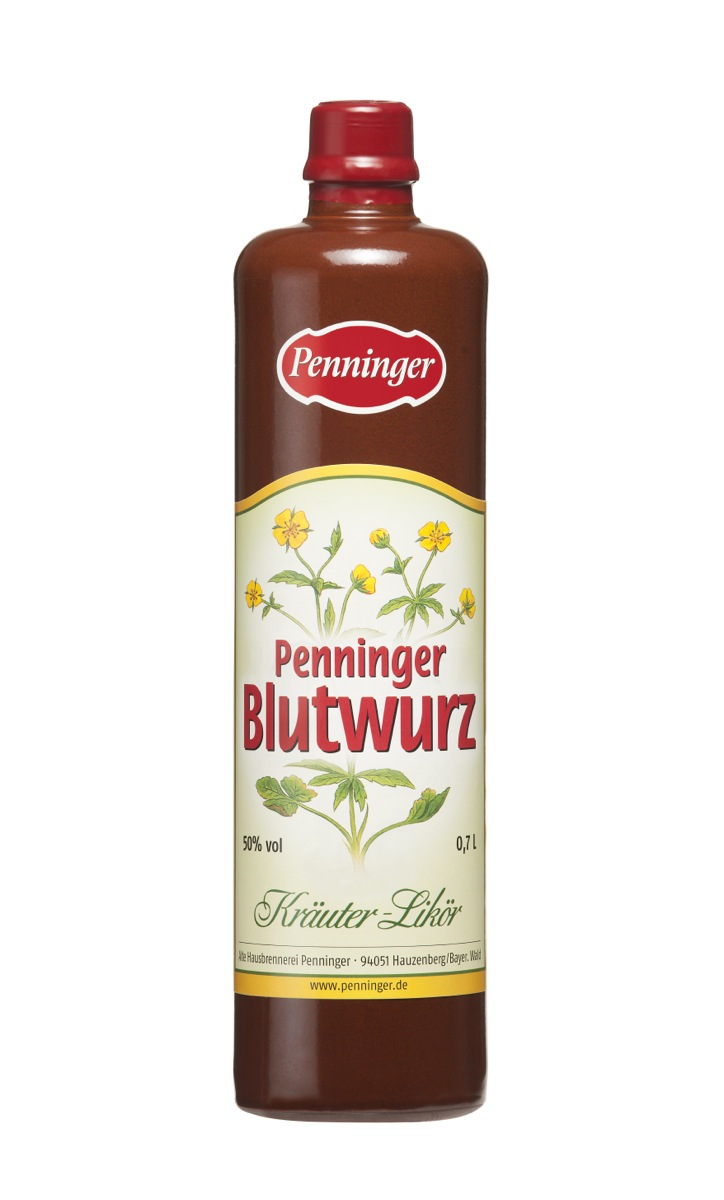
- Penninger Blutwurz
- Type: herbal liqueur
- Manufacturer: Various
- Origin: Bavaria, Germany
- Alcohol by volume: 38–60%, depending on the manufacturer
- Color: Red

Blutwurz is a German herbal liqueur (Bitter) made from the rhizome of the common tormentil plant (Potentilla erecta), which derives its German name (‌‌“Blutwurz”, bloodwort) from the reddish color of the juice that emerges when the rhizome is cut. The plant provided a traditional anti-inflammatory medicine. In addition to still being used medicinally in the form of tea, syrup, cream, or powder, it is also a key ingredient for a liqueur produced in Bavaria.

Penninger Blutwurz is the most well-known brand. It is 50% alcohol by volume; the rhizome is macerated, steeped in alcohol for some four to five weeks, and the resulting liquid then filtered. Eschewing distillation in favor of maceration extracts the root's essential oils while preserving its flavor and color. The liqueur is consumed as an apéritif or digestif, or used for cocktails.

== Non-exhaustive list of producers ==
- Alte Hausbrennerei Penninger
- Bärwurzerei Heinrich Hieke
- Bad Kötztinger Bärwurzquelle (Anleitner)
- Schlosskellerei Ramelsberg
- Bauer Spirituosen Lalling
- Bärwurzerei Gerl
