= Disaronno =

Italian liqueur

Disaronno Originale
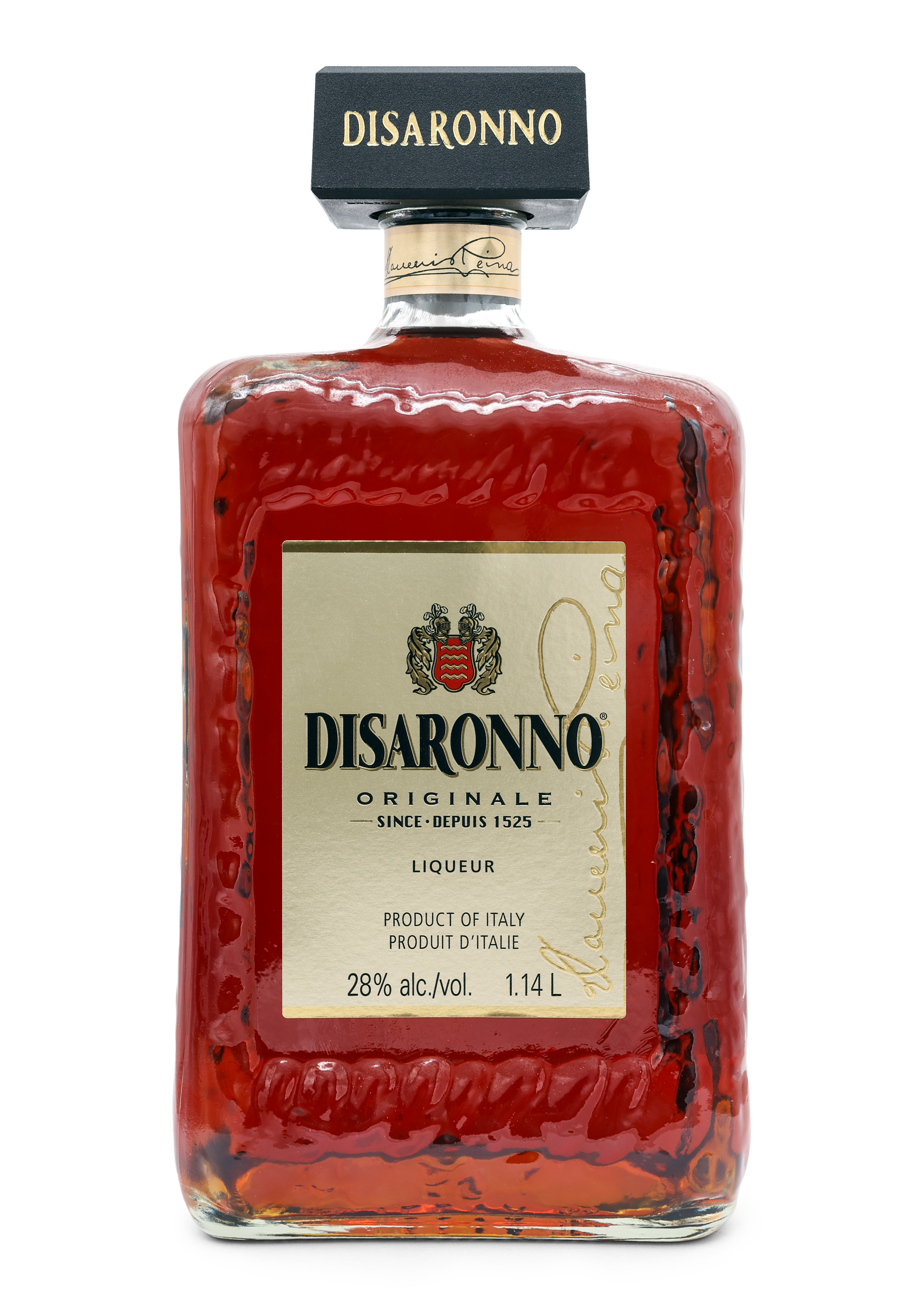
- The Disaronno Originale square bottle
- Type: Liqueur
- Manufacturer: Illva Saronno
- Origin: Italy
- Introduced: 1525
- Alcohol by volume: 28%
- Proof (US): 56
- Colour: Amber
- Flavour: Sweet, cherry/almond
- Website: disaronno.com/en/

Disaronno Originale (28% ABV, 56 proof) is a type of amaretto—an amber-colored liqueur with a characteristic almond taste, although it does not actually contain almonds. It is produced by Illva Saronno in Saronno, in the Lombardy region of Italy, and is sold worldwide. According to the company, the liqueur is an infusion of apricot kernel oil with "absolute alcohol, burnt sugar, and the pure essence of seventeen selected herbs and fruits". The liqueur is sold in an oblong glass bottle designed by a craftsman from Murano.

The product was called Amaretto di Saronno (Amaretto from Saronno) until 2001, when it was rebranded as "Disaronno Originale" for marketing reasons.

Disaronno can be served neat as a liqueur, on the rocks, or as part of a cocktail mixed with other alcoholic beverages, cola, ginger ale, or fruit juice. It may also be added to hot chocolate and is an ingredient in the Italian variant of an Irish coffee. The amaretto liqueur can also be used in the Italian dessert tiramisu.

Disaronno Velvet, a cream liqueur (17% ABV, 34 proof), was introduced in 2020.
