= Gourmet Makes =

American video series

- Genre: Cooking show
- Presented by: Claire Saffitz
- Country of origin: United States
- Original language: English
- No. of seasons: 1
- No. of episodes: 44

Production
- Producer: Bon Appétit

Original release
- Network: YouTube
- Release: July 18, 2017 – May 28, 2020

Gourmet Makes is a video series produced by Bon Appétit, aired primarily on the video sharing platform YouTube. In the series, Senior Food Editor Claire Saffitz attempts to recreate gourmet versions of classic American snack foods. Each episode is broken up into three parts: what is it, how to make it, and how to make it gourmet. The first episode aired on July 18, 2017, as Saffitz recreated a Twinkie. A total of 44 episodes aired, with the last episode airing on May 28, 2020, the second part of Saffitz recreating a gourmet Choco Taco.

== Format ==
Saffitz is greeted at her workstation with an abundance of a particular snack food. She dissects the snack food, analyzes its components, and researches how it is made and manufactured. She often references How It's Made as a starting point for her work. She reads the ingredients of each item, which she often states is her “favorite part.”

In part 2, Saffitz experiments and tests different recipes, ingredients, and techniques to try to recreate the snack food. While the focus is on the snack food she is recreating, Saffitz often makes contraptions and oddly specific kitchen tools to help in her overall process. She frequently asks her fellow Bon Appétit test kitchen chefs Andy Baraghani, Molly Baz, Christina Chaey, Alex Delany, Sohla El-Waylly, Brad Leone, Gaby Melian, Chris Morocco, Carla Lalli Music, and Amiel Stanek for advice throughout the process. At the end of part 2 when Saffitz has successfully made her gourmet version of the snack food, she calls over members of the test kitchen staff to taste and review her creation.

Finally, Saffitz presents and reads through her final recipe, with the final iteration of the gourmet project accompanied by video clips of her process.

== Impact ==
Through Gourmet Makes, Saffitz connects with viewers beyond the screen. Particularly during the COVID-19 pandemic, Gourmet Makes served as a way to learn about cooking, as a tool to get through the pandemic. While the show started as a casual exploration of popular snack foods, it succeeded because of Saffitz's wittiness and attention to detail. Viewers find Saffitz's visible frustration when a particular test doesn't live up to her high standards, relatable. Gourmet Makes doesn't shy away from showing the difficult, frustrating parts of cooking. This transparency sets the series apart from other cooking shows. It shows the difficulties in the cooking process, rather than the highlights like other shows tend to do. Because of Saffitz's relatableness, the series has attracted a cult following of Gourmet Makes fans. Saffitz inspired the #IWDFCFTBATK, meaning "I would die for Claire from the Bon Appétit Test Kitchen."

== Gourmet Makes now ==
The last episode of Gourmet Makes aired during the peak of the COVID-19 pandemic. In June 2020, previous editor-in-chief Adam Rapoport resigned after receiving widespread criticism over the discriminatory pay of his employees of color. Shortly after, in October 2020, Saffitz announced that she would not be returning to Bon Appétit and Condé Nast Entertainment in light of the controversy.

While Bon Appétit is no longer releasing new episodes of Gourmet Makes, the series still lives online for viewers to watch. The series can be found on Bon Appétit's YouTube channel and video library. Saffitz has continued making videos for her personal YouTube channel, including a series called “Claire Recreates,” where she once again recreates gourmet snack foods.

== Episodes ==
Episode name	Release date
"Pastry Chef Attempts to Make a Gourmet Twinkie"	July 18, 2017
"Pastry Chef Attempts to Make Gourmet Gushers"	December 20, 2017
"Pastry Chef Attempts to Make Gourmet Cheetos"	March 21, 2018
"Pastry Chef Attempts to Make Gourmet Kit Kats"	May 2, 2018
"Pastry Chef Attempts to Make Gourmet Skittles"	June 5, 2018
"Pastry Chef Attempts to Make Gourmet Lucky Charms"	June 26, 2018
"Pastry Chef Attempts to Make Gourmet Oreos"	July 31, 2018
"Pastry Chef Attempts to Make Gourmet Twizzlers"	September 18, 2018
"Pastry Chef Attempts to Make Gourmet Sno Balls"	November 14, 2018
"Pastry Chef Attempts to Make Gourmet Instant Ramen"	November 29, 2018
"Pastry Chef Attempts to Make Gourmet Snickers"	December 21, 2018
"Pastry Chef Attempts to Make Gourmet Pringles"	January 22, 2019
"Pastry Chef Attempts to Make Gourmet Ferrero Rocher"	February 12, 2019
"Pastry Chef Attempts to Make Gourmet Reese's Peanut Butter Cups"	March 5, 2019
"Pastry Chef Attempts to Make Gourmet Cheez-Its"	March 26, 2019
"Pastry Chef Attempts to Make Gourmet Peeps"	April 19, 2019
"Pastry Chef Attempts to Make Gourmet Almond Joys"	May 9, 2019
"Pastry Chef Attempts to Make Gourmet Doritos"	May 22, 2019
"Pastry Chef Attempts to Make Gourmet Twix"	June 13, 2019
"Pastry Chef Attempts to Make Gourmet Starbursts"	June 20, 2019
"Pastry Chef Attempts to Make Gourmet Pop Rocks"	July 17, 2019
"Pastry Chef Attempts to Make Gourmet Pop-Tarts"	August 7, 2019
"Pastry Chef Attempts to Make Gourmet Pocky"	August 20, 2019
"Pastry Chef Attempts to Make Gourmet M&M's"	September 11, 2019
"Pastry Chef Attempts to Make Gourmet Hot Pockets"	September 25, 2019
"Pastry Chef Attempts to Make Gourmet Sour Patch Kids"	October 9, 2019
"Pastry Chef Attempts to Make Gourmet Ruffles"	October 22, 2019
"Pastry Chef Attempts to Make Gourmet Takis"	November 5, 2019
"Pastry Chef Attempts to Make Gourmet Mentos"	November 14, 2019
"Pastry Chef Attempts to Make Gourmet Krispy Kreme Doughnuts"	November 26, 2019
"Pastry Chef Attempts to Make Gourmet Warheads"	December 3, 2019
"Pastry Chef Attempts to Make Gourmet Milky Way Bars"	December 13, 2019
"Pastry Chef Attempts to Make Gourmet Pizza Rolls"	December 24, 2019
"Pastry Chef Attempts to Make Gourmet Jelly Belly Jelly Beans"	January 23, 2020
"Pastry Chef Attempts to Make Gourmet Ben & Jerry's Ice Cream"	January 27, 2020
"Pastry Chef Attempts to Make Gourmet Butterfingers"	February 11, 2020
"Pastry Chef Attempts to Make Gourmet Combos"	February 25, 2020
"Pastry Chef Attempts to Make Gourmet Bagel Bites"	March 10, 2020
"Pastry Chef Attempts to Make Gourmet Girl Scout Cookies"	March 17, 2020
"Pastry Chefs Attempts to Make Gourmet Andes Mints"	April 1, 2020
"Pastry Chef Attempts to Make Gourmet Cadbury Creme Eggs"	April 9, 2020
"Pastry Chef Attempts to Make Gourmet Tater Tots"	May 5, 2020
"Pastry Chef Attempts to Make Gourmet Choco Tacos Part 1"	May 26, 2020
"Pastry Chef Attempts to Make Gourmet Choco Tacos Part 2"	May 28, 2020
