= Andy Baraghani =

American chef and food writer (born 1989)

- Born: Andisheh Baraghani; November 27, 1989 (age 36)
- Occupations: Chef, food writer
- Spouse: Keith Pollock (m. 2024)
- Writing career
- Notable work: The Cook You Want to Be
- Notable awards: James Beard Award (2023)
- Website: andybaraghani.com

Andisheh "Andy" Baraghani (Persian: اندیشه برغانی, born November 27, 1989) is an American chef and food writer.

Baraghani's first job as a teenager was at the restaurant Chez Panisse in Berkeley, California. He moved across the United States to study at New York University and work in New York City restaurants before transitioning into a career in media in 2013. Following a brief stint as a food editor at Tasting Table, he joined Bon Appétit in 2015 as a senior food editor and soon became a frequent presenter on the publication's YouTube channel.

Baraghani left Bon Appétit in 2021 to work on a cookbook, The Cook You Want to Be (2022), which contains recipes and essays that cover his personal life and career. The book won a James Beard Award.

== Early life ==
Baraghani was born on November 27, 1989 and raised in the San Francisco Bay Area in California. Baraghani is Iranian American and he grew up speaking Persian. His parents had immigrated from Iran to Berkeley in 1977, a year before the Iranian Revolution. When he was young, he often experimented with various foods and played with a Fisher-Price kitchen, his favorite toy as a child. As a teenager, he worked his first job at the Berkeley restaurant Chez Panisse, where he started as an intern and became a line cook in its kitchen. In his time at the restaurant working under Alice Waters, whom he regards as his "culinary idol", he learned cooking technique and how to be agile and "think methodically." One particular experience Baraghani recalls is when he cried after he could not understand what Waters asked him in French. By the time he graduated from high school, he had worked in three restaurants including Chez Panisse.

== Career ==
=== Early food writer positions ===
While studying food studies and cultural anthropology at New York University, Baraghani worked as an editor for the food publication Saveur. After he left his job and graduated from university, he worked in the New York City restaurants Frej, Corton, and Estela. He transitioned from a career in the restaurant business into one in the media industry in 2013 and soon after became a food editor for the online publication Tasting Table.

=== Time at Bon Appétit (2015–2021) ===
In 2015, he joined Bon Appétit as senior food editor. He was additionally co-editor of Healthyish, a publication by Bon Appétit which focuses on clean eating. When Bon Appétit began to increase its focus on video content in 2016, he started presenting on the publication's YouTube channel with Molly Baz, Sohla El-Waylly, Priya Krishna, Brad Leone, and Claire Saffitz. Baraghani was one of seventeen chefs who operated a Manhattan pop-up restaurant by Google open for four days in April 2016. With musicians Cupcakke and Ella Mai, Baraghani and Baz held cooking demonstrations at the Outside Lands Music and Arts Festival in San Francisco in 2019. In early 2020, the LGBTQ magazine Out published a profile of Baraghani that dubbed him "the internet boyfriend of our dreams".

In June 2020, during the George Floyd protests against police brutality and racism, Bon Appétit editor-in-chief Adam Rapoport resigned after a 2004 photo of him in brownface previously published on Instagram garnered criticism online. Staff members, among other critics on social media, accused the publication and its parent company Condé Nast of discrimination against their employees of color and called for better compensation and treatment. Baraghani himself was accused of microaggressions toward a female Korean American coworker. A few days later, he posted a statement to Instagram in which he criticized the publication's workplace culture and apologized for the ways he had "undermined" and "hurt" BIPOC (black, indigenous, and people of color) coworkers, particularly a "former coworker". He continued working at the publication for another year, unlike some coworkers who resigned at the time in protest. Speaking with the Financial Times in 2022, he explained that leaving Bon Appétit was "a privilege I didn't feel I had" because of his middle-class background and the large amount of student debt he had accrued. He departed the publication in August 2021 to work on a cookbook.

=== After Bon Appétit (2021–present) ===
Baraghani's cookbook, The Cook You Want to Be: Everyday Recipes to Impress, was published in 2022 by Lorena Jones Books. The cookbook contains recipes and essays on his childhood, international travels, and career. According to The Mercury News, it "features a wide range of veg-forward, flavor-packed and often unexpected dishes" as well as dishes he ate in his childhood such as aush reshteh, a stew, and chelo (pilaf) with tahdig (scorched rice). The book won him a James Beard Award in the general cookbook category in 2023.

In a 2023 interview, Baraghani stated he was planning to write his second book and start a project to produce city guides for worldwide destinations.

== Personal life ==
Baraghani is gay. He lives with his husband Keith Pollock, whom he met while they were employed by Condé Nast. Pollock has worked as an executive of Architectural Digest and West Elm, a brand of houseware stores. They met in 2017, and after a period of "flirty friendship," they began dating. Pollock proposed in March 2023, and just over a year later, they married in New York.

Baraghani stated in a Bon Appétit article that he had only worked in a kitchen with one other man who was openly gay, despite cooking in "male-led" kitchens through his career, and felt as though kitchens "weren't exactly environments that encouraged me to come out" due to cultural norms of the profession.
