= Molly Baz =

American cook, food writer, and video host (born 1988)

- Born: May 9, 1988 (age 38)
- Education: Skidmore College
- Occupations: Cook, recipe developer, and food writer
- Notable work: Cook This Book, More Is More
- Website: mollybaz.com

Molly Baz (née Lundquist-Baz; born May 9, 1988) is an American cook, recipe developer, and food writer. She was a senior food editor at Bon Appétit magazine and appeared frequently in videos for the magazine's YouTube channel before leaving in 2020. Baz has published two cookbooks, Cook This Book (2021) and More Is More (2023), both of which are New York Times Best Sellers.

== Early life and education ==
Baz was born on May 9, 1988. She is from Rhinebeck, New York. She was educated at Poughkeepsie Day School where she graduated in 2006. She then studied art history at Skidmore College in Saratoga Springs, graduating in 2010. She discovered her love of cooking while studying abroad in Florence, Italy. In her senior year at Skidmore, she and her classmate hosted biweekly dinners that were prepared with local ingredients and open to the local Saratoga Springs community.

== Career ==
=== Early career (2008–2014) ===
Wanting to work as a chef without attending culinary school, Baz worked as a line cook in restaurants in Boston and New York City from 2008 to 2014, including at the now-closed Picholine in Lincoln Square. She took a break between jobs in 2011 to go on a road trip in the southern United States with her father, who is a photographer, and visit barbecue establishments and learn from barbecue pitmasters. While in New York in 2013, she co-founded a catering company named Rustic Supper.

=== Time at Bon Appétit (2015–2020) ===
Baz worked as a recipe tester for Condé Nast's Epicurious starting in 2015 before moving to Bon Appétit, where in 2018 she was Senior Associate Food Editor. After Bon Appétit increased its focus on video content in 2016, Baz also presented on the magazine's YouTube channel with Andy Baraghani, Sohla El-Waylly, Priya Krishna, Brad Leone, and Claire Saffitz. One video series, Making Perfect, had Baz and other staff of the Bon Appétit test kitchen cook "perfect" versions of meals such as pizza or a Thanksgiving dinner. According to food website Eater, fans on YouTube praised Baz for her "casual relatability, her thoroughly explained recipes, and her attention to detail." With Baraghani and musicians Cupcakke and Ella Mai, Baz held cooking demonstrations at the Outside Lands Music and Arts Festival in San Francisco in 2019.

In June 2020, Bon Appétit editor-in-chief Adam Rapoport resigned after a photo of him in brownface garnered criticism. The resignation also came as employees, including assistant food editor Sohla El-Waylly, publicly accused the magazine and its parent company Condé Nast of discriminating against employees of color. After El-Waylly, Krishna, and Rick Martinez, all people of color, announced their departure from the magazine's video content in August, Baz wrote on Instagram that she would no longer appear in videos for the magazine. She departed the publication in October.

=== After Bon Appétit (2020–present) ===
In November 2020, Baz started a food media subscription service on Patreon named Recipe Club through which she offered weekly recipes and other content. According to Business Insider, after one month of business, Recipe Club had gained "several thousand" subscribers. Baz chose a subscription business model for Recipe Club so she could keep developing recipes and prevent herself from "going dark" before publishing her cookbook in early 2021. Also in December, Baz and Bon Appétit colleague Carla Lalli Music began a livestreamed video series on the Instagram Live platform, titled You Got Snack'd.

Baz published a cookbook, titled Cook This Book, on April 20, 2021, through the Clarkson Potter imprint. The book was critically and commercially successful, becoming a New York Times Best Seller. Food52 and Taste of Home named the book as one of the best cookbooks of 2021. A review by Publishers Weekly described the book as "an exciting crash course in cooking fundamentals." Describing the book as "downright rebellious" at times, Anne Valdespino of The Mercury News wrote that the book's title "smacks" of activist Abbie Hoffman's Steal This Book and highlighted its "unconventional format", "slangy lingo", and "well placed cuss words."

In 2022, it was announced that Baz would appear as a guest judge on the Discovery+ streaming series The Julia Child Challenge, created by the Food Network. Baz published a second cookbook, More Is More, with Clarkson Potter in October 2023. Library Journal reviewer Sarah Tansley recommended the book, writing that it offers "plenty of instruction for beginners and spunky flair and big flavor for all kitchens", and Wired magazine's Joe Ray later named it as one of nineteen best cookbooks for the year. In 2024, a Times Square billboard advertisement for lactation cookies, which featured Baz with a pregnant stomach and breasts that were partially covered with the cookies, was removed by the billboard's owner after it determined it had violated its "guidelines on acceptable content." A week later the ad was put up on another billboard in Times Square. This was followed later that year by an advertising deal with the cereal brand Special K and the launch of a flavored mayonnaise brand called "Ayoh".

== Personal life ==
Baz and her husband Ben Willett moved from New York City to Altadena, California, a suburb of Los Angeles, California, in 2020. Their son was born in 2024. Their home burned down during the January 2025 Southern California wildfires.
