= Tammie Teclemariam =

American wine journalist

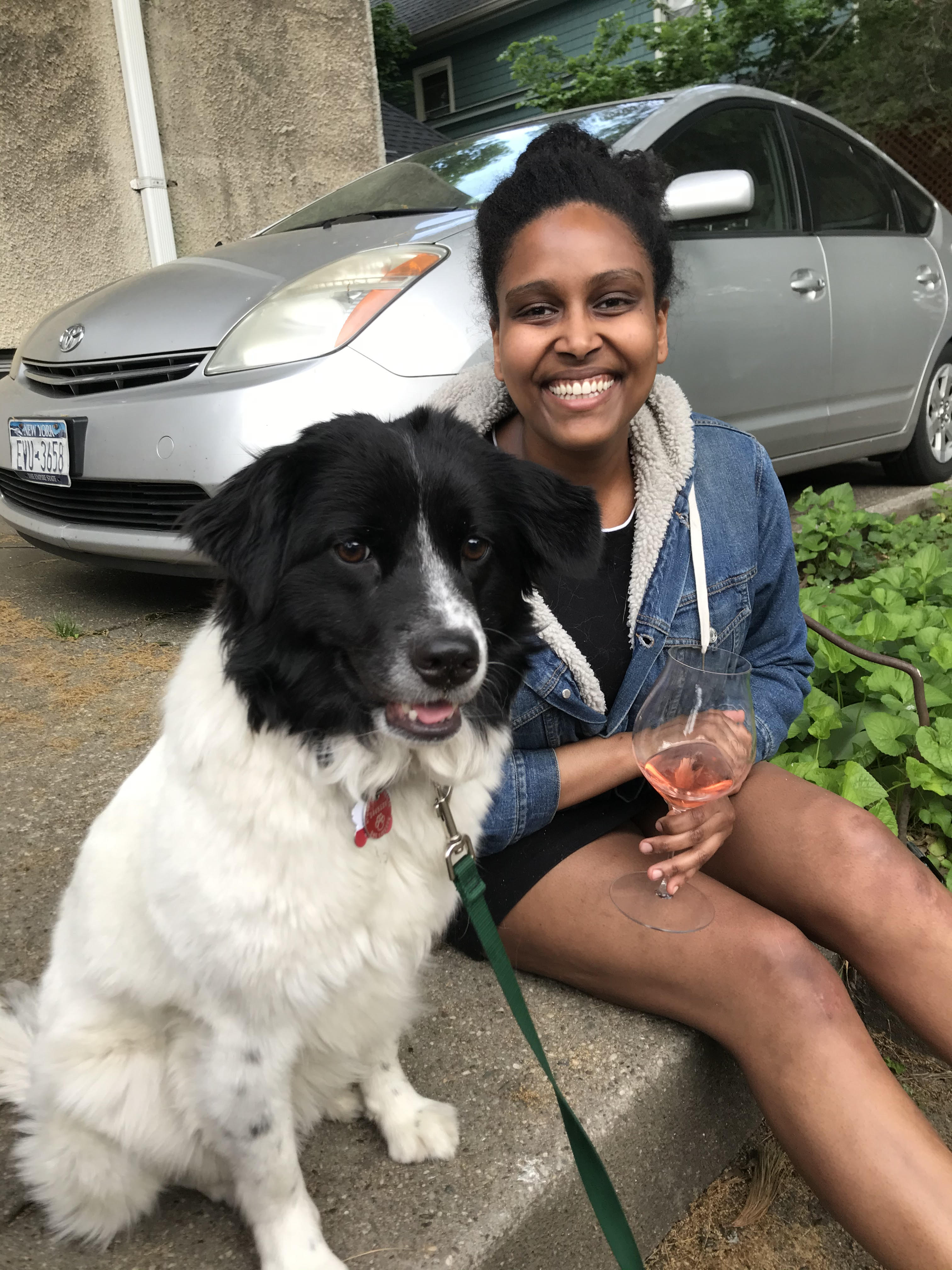
Teclemariam with her dog, Buffer

Tammie Teclemariam (born c. 1990) is an American freelance food and wine writer. She is known for her social media posts about alleged racism in food and wine media organizations. Teclemarian’s tweet concerning a photo of Bon Appétit editor-in-chief Adam Rapoport, which is perceived to be racially insensitive, led to his resignation from the magazine. Subsequently, several other individuals came forward with alleged instances of racism at the magazine. Other resignations of media figures have been connected to tweets by her.

== Early life and education ==
Teclemariam was born about 1990 to Eritrean immigrants and raised in Silver Spring, Maryland. Her father is a librarian. At 16 she started attending St. John's College in Annapolis. She moved to France to go to pastry school, graduating from St. John's afterward. She did an apprenticeship in viticulture and winemaking at Clos Centeilles in Minervois, France.

== Career ==
Teclemariam started working in food and wine in 2011. She started out in a sales job for a wine importer and in 2015 got an internship at Eater. She worked in wine shops, including Astor Wines, to develop her wine knowledge and calls herself a "wine unprofessional". She started freelancing as a food and wine writer. She has written about food and wine for Wine Enthusiast, Eater, Taste, Epicurious, and Wirecutter.

In the immediate aftermath of the murder of George Floyd, Teclemariam attended protests and felt "motivated to continue to fight for justice." Over the next weeks, she tweeted about multiple food media figures' failure to address racial disparities in their organizations, tweets that were followed by multiple resignations in the food & wine media industry. NPR's Katherine Cole called the fallout a "huge upheaval in the food media that's actually really exciting."

In early June, while a May 31 column by Bon Appetit's editor-in chief Adam Rapoport discussing how the magazine was covering "the uprisings" was being criticized for being tone deaf, Illyana Maisonet, who is Puerto Rican, posted a series of tweets showing Rapoport turning down a recent pitch for a story on Puerto Rican rice fritters in a way seen as dismissive and disrespectful. Shortly afterward, Teclemariam tweeted a photo of Rapoport in racial brownface at a 2004 costume party. The photo showed Rappoport dressed in a "stereotypical Puerto Rican costume" of do-rag, sleeveless undershirt, and chains. Teclemariam captioned the photo, “I do not know why Adam Rapoport simply doesn’t write about Puerto Rican food for @bonappétit himself!!!” Teclemariam recalled that when she posted the photo, she had been unaware of the fact Bon Appétit employees had been complaining about the racial inequalities at the magazine. By the end of the day Rappoport, who had been criticized multiple times for his treatment of minority staffers, had resigned. The New York Times said her tweet helped spur "a reckoning over institutional racism at the magazine." Bon Appétit hired Dawn Davis as its new editor-in-chief and Sonia Chopra as its new executive editor.

According to GrubStreet, Teclemariam's Twitter feed quickly became the "Page Six" of the food and wine media, including some unsubstantiated claims that she later had to walk back. GrubStreet said she could be "vicious" in her methods, such as calling on her followers to harass Bon Appétit video host Brad Leone during an Instagram Live and tweeting that Vogue editor-in-chief Anna Wintour is “famous for being thin at 70.” On June 9, 2020, Teclemarian tweeted about a cake depicting a Confederate flag that former Bon Appétit drinks editor Alex Delany had posted to his Tumblr in 2010. Teclemariam called for the removal of Matt Duckor, the VP of video for Condé Nast, who resigned the next day. She tweeted a multipost thread of allegations about Peter Meehan, editor of the Los Angeles Times food section, and two days later he resigned. Multiple LA Times staffers said that without Teclemariam's twitter thread, the conversation that led to his resignation would not have happened. The New York Times profiled her in a piece about Black wine professionals.

Teclemariam told The New York Times that she had been "collateral damage" caused by the February 2021 implosion of the Reply All podcast four-episode series "The Test Kitchen." She was scheduled to appear on the series, which was designed as an investigation of racism in food media and specifically at Bon Appétit. After accusations by former Gimlet employee Eric Eddings that Reply All, its hosts, and its parent company, Gimlet, themselves were guilty of nearly the identical kinds of mistreatment of employees of color as they were reporting on at Bon Appétit, the series was cancelled and the podcast itself paused before Teclemariam's episode was released.

In December 2021, Teclemariam was named the first ever Diner-at-Large for New York.

== Personal life ==
Teclemariam lives in the Ditmas Park neighborhood of Brooklyn, New York, with five housemates.
