= Face Plant (restaurant) =

Vegan drive-through in Portland, Oregon, U.S.

- Interactive map of Face Plant

Restaurant information
- Established: January 2025
- Owner: Matt Plitch
- Location: 3110 North Going Street, Portland, Multnomah, Oregon, 97217, United States
- Coordinates: 45.5556°N 122.6987°W

Face Plant is a vegan restaurant in Portland, Oregon, United States. Co-founders Molly Baz and Matt Plitch opened the drive-through in 2025.

== Description ==
The drive-through and dine-in restaurant Face Plant operates on Going Street in north Portland's Overlook neighborhood. It serves plant-based fast food such as burgers and nuggets (using Impossible Foods products as a base), French fries, shakes, and sodas. Burger options are "classic", also known as "red and yellow" (American cheese, ketchup, and pickles), or "deluxe", also known as "fancy" (lettuce, onion, tomato, and special sauce). Staff go to vehicles to take orders, instead of using an intercom system.

== History ==
Co-founders Molly Baz and Matt Plitch opened the drive-through in January 2025, in a space that previously operated as a McDonald's location. Plitch is the chief executive officer and owner. Baz is the head of culinary development.

In late September 2026, the business was losing approximately $3,000 per week during the temporary closure of Interstate 5.

== Reception ==
Paolo Bicchieri included the business in Eater Portland's 2025 overview of the city's best restaurants for lunch. Alex Frane included the business in Portland Monthly's 2025 list of restaurant opening that defined the city in 2025.

== See also ==
- Fast-food restaurant
- List of vegetarian and vegan restaurants
