= Combos =

Brand of manufactured snack

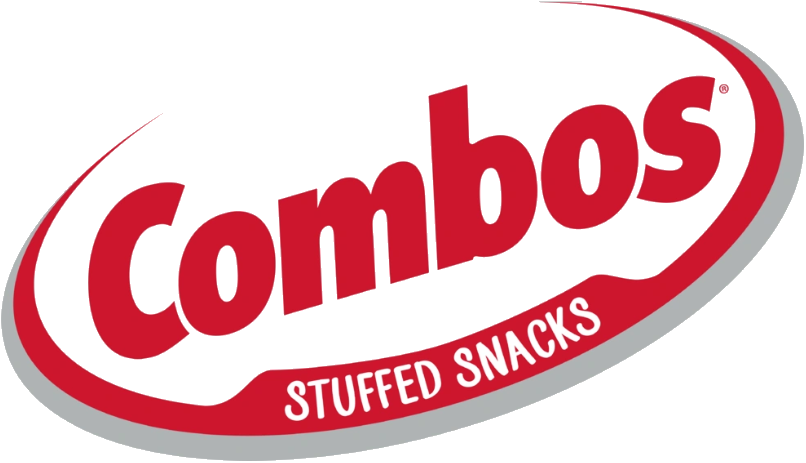

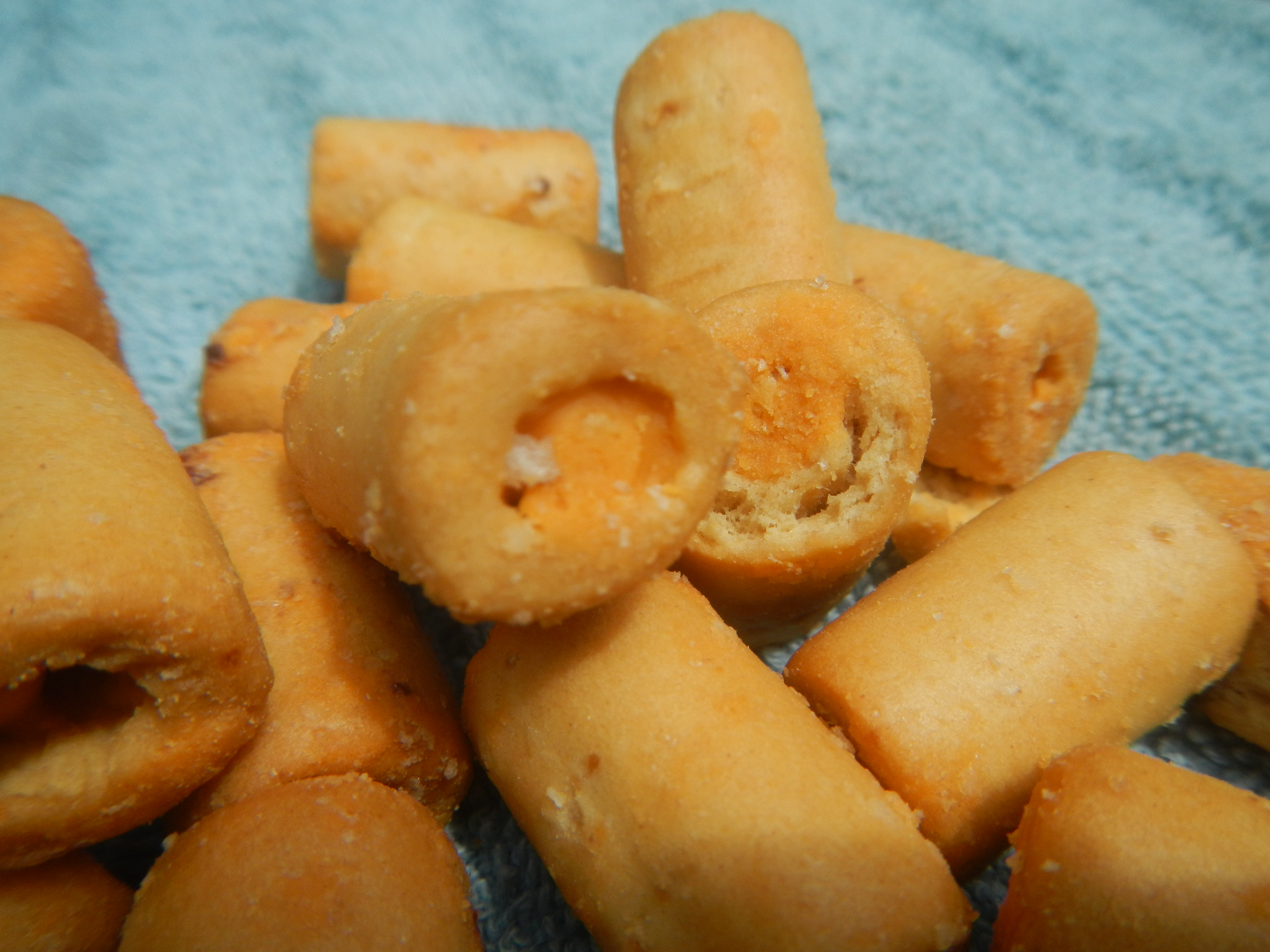
- Cheddar Cheese Baked Cracker Combos
- Product type: Snack
- Current owner: Mars, Inc.
- Produced by: Mars, Inc.
- Country: United States
- Introduced: 1970s; 55 years ago
- Website: combos.com

Combos, officially called Combos Stuffed Snacks, are a snack food distributed by Mars, Incorporated, and sold in the United States. Products are available on cylindrical tubes of cracker, pretzel, or tortilla, available with various fillings.

"Combos Snack" was established in Battle Creek, Michigan, in the 1970s, though the pretzel form was produced first, Combos were first released in cracker form. They are also available with tortilla shells.

In mid-June 2016, some varieties of Combos were affected by an undeclared nut-related recall.

== Production ==
Combos are produced by forming a soft bread-like dough, which is hollowed out into a tube-shaped form. A cutter slices the dough into bite-sized lengths. The snacks are then baked, cooled, and filled with the appropriate filling.

=== Flavors ===
Combos are available in seven standard flavors:

- Cheddar Cheese Pretzel
- Pizzeria Pretzel
- Pepperoni Pizza Cracker
- Cheddar Cheese Cracker
- Buffalo Blue Cheese Pretzel
- Nacho Cheese Pretzel
- Ranch Dip Pretzel

They also offer several limited edition or exclusive flavors:

- Honey Sriracha Pretzel
- Spicy Honey Mustard Pretzel
- Jalapeño Cheddar
- Cheddar Cheese Bacon Pretzel (Walgreens exclusive)
- Sweet Barbeque Baked Cracker (Walgreens exclusive)
- Garlic Parmesan Baked Cracker

Discontinued flavors include:

- Bacon, Egg, and Cheese Cracker
- Cheeseburger Cracker
- Mustard Pretzel
- Zesty Salsa Tortilla
- Peanut Butter Pretzel
- Peanut Butter Cracker
- Seven Layer Dip Tortilla
- Sweet & Salty Caramel Crème Pretzel
- Sweet & Salty Vanilla Frosting Pretzel

== Advertising ==
In 2006, Combos worked with TBWA and Agency.com to create the Man Mom campaign, and in 2008, Combos worked with Agency.com to create the Combos Nation campaign. Combos was an official sponsor of Kyle Busch, NASCAR driver of the number 18 Toyota Camry, whose car featured other Mars, Incorporated products as well. Busch won the 2008 Best Buy 400 benefiting Student Clubs for Autism Speaks with Combos as the primary sponsor of his car. It is the official cheese-filled snack of NASCAR.

== In popular culture ==
- In 1995, Marvel Comics collaborated with Combos to create a series of advertisements featuring "Combo Man", a superhero who was a combination of 14 other Marvel characters. Combo Man would get a one-shot comic book one year later.
- The 2000 Morphine song "Top Floor Bottom Buzzer" on the album The Night contains the lines, "There's a muchacha, teachin' me to mambo. There's my buddy Pete eyein' a bowl of Combos."
- Rodney Rush played the character of Christian "Combo" Ortega on the show Breaking Bad, named after the snack.
- Comedian and actor Aziz Ansari references the snack in his 2015 book Modern Romance: An Investigation, saying, "Should I go out with this girl even though she listed Combos as one of her favorite snack foods? Combos!!?"
- The snack was featured on a February 2020 episode of the Bon Appétit YouTube channel series Gourmet Makes with Claire Saffitz.
- Combos were discussed on episode #164 on the podcast Conan O'Brien Needs a Friend.
- A Combos conspiracy theory was discussed on episode #91 on the podcast Amerikinda with Cory and Travis.
