= 2007 Subway 500 =

Race details
- Race 32 of 36 in the 2007 NASCAR Nextel Cup Series season
- The 2007 Subway 500 program cover, celebrating the 60th anniversary of the speedway opening.
- Date: October 21, 2007
- Official name: Subway 500
- Location: Martinsville Speedway, Ridgeway, Virginia
- Course: Permanent racing facility
- Course length: 0.847 km (0.526 miles)
- Distance: 506 laps, 266.156 mi (428.336 km)
- Scheduled distance: 500 laps, 263 mi (423.257 km)
- Weather: Temperatures up to 82 °F (28 °C); wind speeds up to 6 miles per hour (9.7 km/h)
- Average speed: 66.608 miles per hour (107.195 km/h)

Pole position
Driver	Jeff Gordon	Hendrick Motorsports
- Time: 19.938

Most laps led
Driver	Jeff Gordon	Hendrick Motorsports
- Laps: 168

Winner
No. 48	Jimmie Johnson	Hendrick Motorsports

Television in the United States
- Network: ABC
- Announcers: Jerry Punch, Rusty Wallace and Andy Petree

The 2007 Subway 500, the 32nd race of the 2007 NASCAR Nextel Cup season and the sixth race in the Chase for the Nextel Cup, ran on Sunday, October 21, 2007, at Martinsville Speedway, located on the outskirts of Martinsville, Virginia. This race was the fifteenth of sixteen series races to use NASCAR's Car of Tomorrow template, which will be made permanent as of the 2008 season.

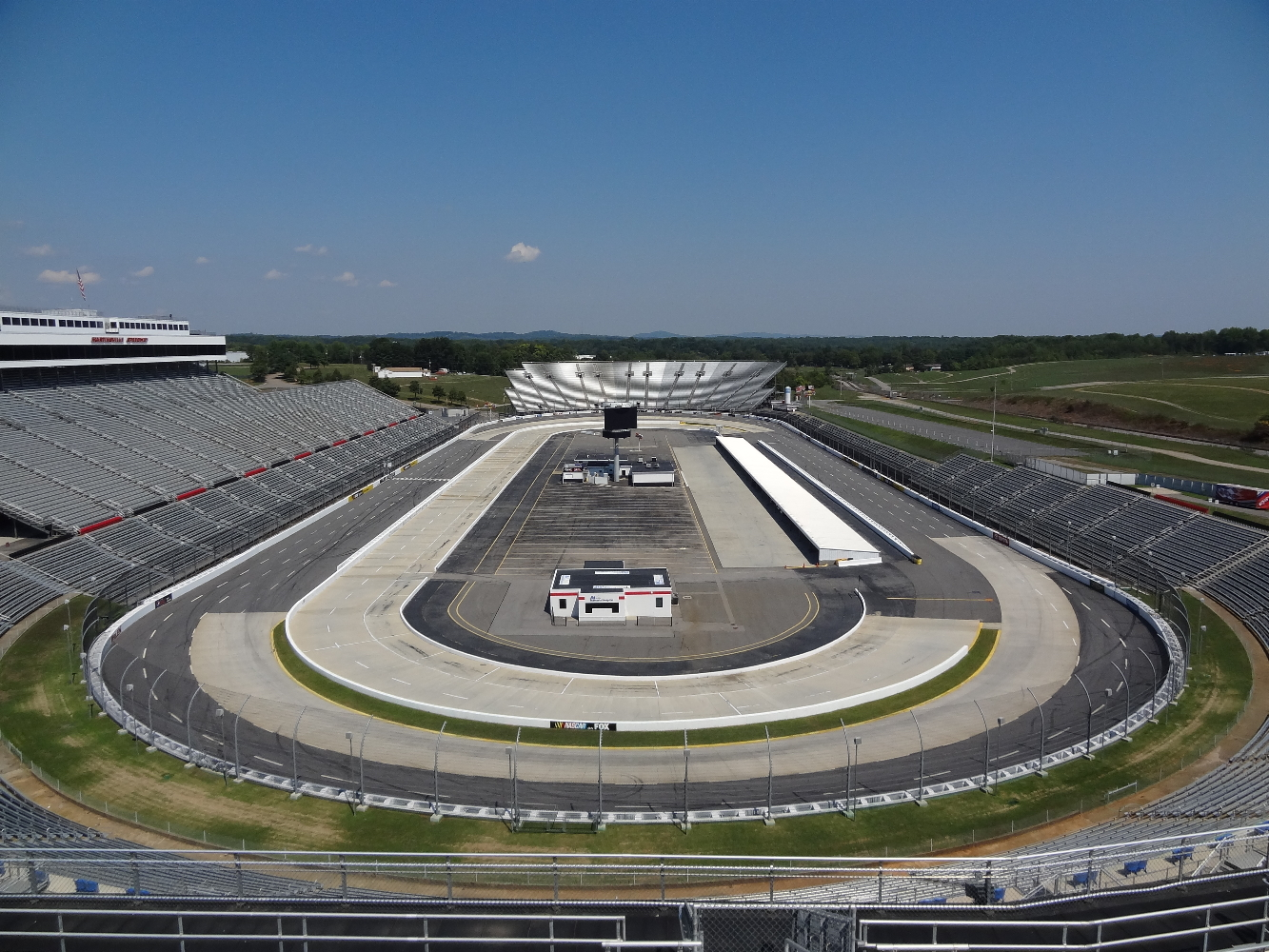
An overview on Martinsville Speedway, from the bleachers on Turns 1 and 2.

The layout of Martinsville Speedway, the venue where the race was held.

It was the final career start for 2002 Daytona 500 winner Ward Burton.

== Background ==
#	Driver	Team	Make	Sponsor
00	David Reutimann	Michael Waltrip Racing	Toyota	Domino's Pizza
1	Martin Truex, Jr.	Dale Earnhardt, Inc.	Chevrolet	Bass Pro Shops, Tracker Boats
01	Aric Almirola	Dale Earnhardt, Inc.	Chevrolet	U.S. Army
2	Kurt Busch	Penske Racing South	Dodge	Miller Lite
4	Ward Burton	Morgan–McClure Motorsports	Chevrolet	ITT Night Vision, State Water Heaters
5	Kyle Busch	Hendrick Motorsports	Chevrolet	Kellogg's, Carquest
6	David Ragan	Roush Fenway Racing	Ford	AAA
06	Sam Hornish, Jr.	Penske Racing South	Dodge	Mobil 1
7	Robby Gordon	Robby Gordon Motorsports	Ford	Mac Tools
07	Clint Bowyer	Richard Childress Racing	Chevrolet	Jack Daniel's
8	Dale Earnhardt, Jr.	Dale Earnhardt, Inc.	Chevrolet	Budweiser
9	Kasey Kahne	Gillett Evernham Motorsports	Dodge	Dodge Dealers, UAW
10	Scott Riggs	Gillett Evernham Motorsports	Dodge	Valvoline, Stanley Tools
11	Denny Hamlin	Joe Gibbs Racing	Chevrolet	FedEx Freight
12	Ryan Newman	Penske Racing South	Dodge	Alltel
15	Paul Menard	Dale Earnhardt, Inc.	Chevrolet	Menards, Pittsburgh Paint
16	Greg Biffle	Roush Fenway Racing	Ford	Dish Network
17	Matt Kenseth	Roush Fenway Racing	Ford	R&L Carriers, DeWalt
18	J.J. Yeley	Joe Gibbs Racing	Chevrolet	Interstate Batteries
19	Elliott Sadler	Gillett Evernham Motorsports	Dodge	Dodge Dealers, UAW
20	Tony Stewart	Joe Gibbs Racing	Chevrolet	The Home Depot
21	Bill Elliott	Wood Brothers Racing	Ford	Little Debbie Snack Cakes
22	Dave Blaney	Bill Davis Racing	Toyota	Caterpillar
24	Jeff Gordon	Hendrick Motorsports	Chevrolet	DuPont
25	Casey Mears	Hendrick Motorsports	Chevrolet	National Guard, GMAC
26	Jamie McMurray	Roush Fenway Racing	Ford	Crown Royal
29	Kevin Harvick	Richard Childress Racing	Chevrolet	Shell, Pennzoil
31	Jeff Burton	Richard Childress Racing	Chevrolet	AT&T Mobility
36	Jeremy Mayfield	Bill Davis Racing	Toyota	360 OTC
37	Kevin Lepage	Front Row Motorsports	Dodge	Front Row Motorsports
38	David Gilliland	Robert Yates Racing	Ford	M&M's
40	David Stremme	Chip Ganassi Racing with Felix Sabates	Dodge	Target House
41	Reed Sorenson	Chip Ganassi Racing with Felix Sabates	Dodge	Target
42	Juan Pablo Montoya	Chip Ganassi Racing with Felix Sabates	Dodge	Texaco, Havoline
43	Bobby Labonte	Petty Enterprises	Dodge	Goody's Headache Powder
44	Dale Jarrett	Michael Waltrip Racing	Toyota	UPS
45	Kyle Petty	Petty Enterprises	Dodge	Marathon America Spirit Motor Oil
48	Jimmie Johnson	Hendrick Motorsports	Chevrolet	Lowe's
49	John Andretti	BAM Racing	Dodge	Paralyzed Veterans of America
55	Michael Waltrip	Michael Waltrip Racing	Toyota	NAPA Auto Parts
66	Jeff Green	Haas CNC Racing	Chevrolet	Haas CNC Machine Tools. Best Buy
70	Johnny Sauter	Haas CNC Racing	Chevrolet	Haas CNC Machine Tools
78	Joe Nemechek	Furniture Row Racing	Chevrolet	Furniture Row Racing
83	Brian Vickers	Red Bull Racing Team	Toyota	Red Bull
84	A.J. Allmendinger	Red Bull Racing Team	Toyota	Red Bull
88	Ricky Rudd	Robert Yates Racing	Ford	Combos, Snickers
96	Tony Raines	Hall of Fame Racing	Chevrolet	DiP HDTVgital Light Processing
99	Carl Edwards	Roush Fenway Racing	Ford	Office Depot

== Qualifying ==
With a lap of 19.938 seconds at a speed of 94.974 miles per hour, seven time Martinsville winner Jeff Gordon took his sixth pole at the paperclip and 63rd of his career. Spring Martinsville winner Jimmie Johnson started fourth. South Boston natives Jeff and Ward Burton both struggled in qualifying, having to start 18th and 36th respectively. Chase contender Tony Stewart started 34th.

Pos.	#	Driver	Team	Make	Time	Speed
1	24	Jeff Gordon	Hendrick Motorsports	Chevrolet	19.938	94.974
2	1	Martin Truex, Jr.	Dale Earnhardt, Inc.	Chevrolet	19.988	94.737
3	29	Kevin Harvick	Richard Childress Racing	Chevrolet	19.999	94.685
4	48	Jimmie Johnson	Hendrick Motorsports	Chevrolet	20.013	94.619
5	9	Kasey Kahne	Gillett Evernham Motorsports	Dodge	20.020	94.585
6	5	Kyle Busch	Hendrick Motorsports	Chevrolet	20.025	94.562
7	8	Dale Earnhardt, Jr.	Dale Earnhardt, Inc.	Chevrolet	20.026	94.557
8	18	J.J. Yeley	Joe Gibbs Racing	Chevrolet	20.039	94.496
9	26	Jamie McMurray	Roush Fenway Racing	Ford	20.050	94.444
10	96	Tony Raines	Hall of Fame Racing	Chevrolet	20.066	94.369
11	2	Kurt Busch	Penske Racing South	Dodge	20.068	94.359
12	12	Ryan Newman	Penske Racing South	Dodge	20.072	94.340
13	70	Johnny Sauter	Haas CNC Racing	Chevrolet	20.084	94.284
14	19	Elliott Sadler	Gillett Evernham Motorsports	Dodge	20.097	94.223
15	49	John Andretti	BAM Racing	Dodge	20.101	94.204
16	43	Bobby Labonte	Petty Enterprises	Dodge	20.113	94.148
17	22	Dave Blaney	Bill Davis Racing	Toyota	20.120	94.115
18	31	Jeff Burton	Richard Childress Racing	Chevrolet	20.126	94.087
19	00	David Reutimann	Michael Waltrip Racing	Toyota	20.127	94.083
20	99	Carl Edwards	Roush Fenway Racing	Ford	20.130	94.069
21	07	Clint Bowyer	Richard Childress Racing	Chevrolet	20.138	94.031
22	25	Casey Mears	Hendrick Motorsports	Chevrolet	20.150	93.975
23	88	Ricky Rudd	Robert Yates Racing	Ford	20.150	93.975
24	17	Matt Kenseth	Roush Fenway Racing	Ford	20.170	93.882
25	84	A.J. Allmendinger	Red Bull Racing Team	Toyota	20.175	93.859
26	42	Juan Pablo Montoya	Chip Ganassi Racing with Felix Sabates	Dodge	20.182	93.826
27	01	Aric Almirola	Dale Earnhardt, Inc.	Chevrolet	20.184	93.817
28	41	Reed Sorenson	Chip Ganassi Racing with Felix Sabates	Dodge	20.184	93.817
29	55	Michael Waltrip	Michael Waltrip Racing	Toyota	20.184	93.817
30	11	Denny Hamlin	Joe Gibbs Racing	Chevrolet	20.185	93.812
31	66	Jeff Green	Haas CNC Racing	Chevrolet	20.205	93.719
32	10	Scott Riggs	Gillett Evernham Motorsports	Dodge	20.206	93.715
33	44	Dale Jarrett	Michael Waltrip Racing	Toyota	20.225	93.627
34	20	Tony Stewart	Joe Gibbs Racing	Chevrolet	20.241	93.553
35	15	Paul Menard	Dale Earnhardt, Inc.	Chevrolet	20.263	93.451
36	4	Ward Burton	Morgan–McClure Motorsports	Chevrolet	20.271	93.414
37	16	Greg Biffle	Roush Fenway Racing	Ford	20.284	93.354
38	40	David Stremme	Chip Ganassi Racing with Felix Sabates	Dodge	20.364	92.988
39	7	Robby Gordon	Robby Gordon Motorsports	Ford	20.390	92.869
40	38	David Gilliland	Robert Yates Racing	Ford	20.405	92.801
41	6	David Ragan	Roush Fenway Racing	Ford	20.446	92.615
42	45	Kyle Petty	Petty Enterprises	Dodge	20.487	92.429
Champion's Provisional
43	21	Bill Elliott	Wood Brothers Racing	Ford	20.462	92.542
Failed to qualify
44	06	Sam Hornish, Jr.	Penske Racing South	Dodge	20.347	93.065
45	78	Joe Nemechek	Furniture Row Racing	Chevrolet	20.376	92.933
46	83	Brian Vickers	Red Bull Racing Team	Toyota	20.449	92.601
47	36	Jeremy Mayfield	Bill Davis Racing	Toyota	20.640	91.744
48	37	Kevin Lepage	Front Row Motorsports	Dodge	20.774	91.152

== Race ==
The 2007 running of the race set a record for cautions in this race, with 21 yellow flags flying for 127 laps. The race was eventually decided under caution, when, during the green-white-checkers, David Ragan spun in turn number 1, ending the single attempt at a racing finish. With his third consecutive win at Martinsville, Johnson became the first driver since Rusty Wallace in 1994–1995 to win three straight races at the track.

== Results ==
Fin	St	#	Driver	Team	Make	Laps	Led	Status	Pts	Winnings
1	4	48	Jimmie Johnson	Hendrick Motorsports	Chevrolet	506	147	running	190	$244,486
2	12	12	Ryan Newman	Penske Racing South	Dodge	506	0	running	170	$181,625
3	1	24	Jeff Gordon	Hendrick Motorsports	Chevrolet	506	168	running	175	$183,386
4	6	5	Kyle Busch	Hendrick Motorsports	Chevrolet	506	106	running	165	$130,375
5	24	17	Matt Kenseth	Roush Fenway Racing	Ford	506	0	running	155	$147,916
6	30	11	Denny Hamlin	Joe Gibbs Racing	Chevrolet	506	0	running	150	$105,800
7	37	16	Greg Biffle	Roush Fenway Racing	Ford	506	0	running	146	$103,950
8	26	42	Juan Pablo Montoya	Chip Ganassi Racing with Felix Sabates	Dodge	506	9	running	147	$116,850
9	21	07	Clint Bowyer	Richard Childress Racing	Chevrolet	506	0	running	138	$85,625
10	3	29	Kevin Harvick	Richard Childress Racing	Chevrolet	506	0	running	134	$131,761
11	20	99	Carl Edwards	Roush Fenway Racing	Ford	506	0	running	130	$82,275
12	18	31	Jeff Burton	Richard Childress Racing	Chevrolet	506	51	running	132	$108,216
13	34	20	Tony Stewart	Joe Gibbs Racing	Chevrolet	506	0	running	124	$116,611
14	10	96	Tony Raines	Hall of Fame Racing	Chevrolet	506	0	running	121	$79,450
15	5	9	Kasey Kahne	Gillett Evernham Motorsports	Dodge	506	0	running	118	$113,591
16	32	10	Scott Riggs	Gillett Evernham Motorsports	Dodge	506	0	running	115	$76,900
17	19	00	David Reutimann	Michael Waltrip Racing	Toyota	506	0	running	112	$87,408
18	29	55	Michael Waltrip	Michael Waltrip Racing	Toyota	506	0	running	109	$80,133
19	2	1	Martin Truex, Jr.	Dale Earnhardt, Inc.	Chevrolet	506	0	running	106	$95,695
20	22	25	Casey Mears	Hendrick Motorsports	Chevrolet	506	0	running	103	$83,975
21	42	45	Kyle Petty	Petty Enterprises	Dodge	506	0	running	100	$80,858
22	16	43	Bobby Labonte	Petty Enterprises	Dodge	506	0	running	97	$103,386
23	7	8	Dale Earnhardt, Jr.	Dale Earnhardt, Inc.	Chevrolet	506	24	running	99	$108,958
24	35	15	Paul Menard	Dale Earnhardt, Inc.	Chevrolet	505	0	running	91	$66,050
25	40	38	David Gilliland	Robert Yates Racing	Ford	505	0	running	88	$93,514
26	41	6	David Ragan	Roush Fenway Racing	Ford	505	0	running	85	$101,650
27	23	88	Ricky Rudd	Robert Yates Racing	Ford	504	0	running	82	$96,308
28	31	66	Jeff Green	Haas CNC Racing	Chevrolet	503	1	running	84	$84,683
29	13	70	Johnny Sauter	Haas CNC Racing	Chevrolet	503	0	running	76	$64,775
30	33	44	Dale Jarrett	Michael Waltrip Racing	Toyota	503	0	running	73	$62,025
31	11	2	Kurt Busch	Penske Racing South	Dodge	501	0	running	70	$98,483
32	9	26	Jamie McMurray	Roush Fenway Racing	Ford	500	0	running	67	$72,175
33	15	49	John Andretti	BAM Racing	Dodge	492	0	transmission	64	$71,472
34	43	21	Bill Elliott	Wood Brothers Racing	Ford	483	0	running	61	$82,564
35	25	84	A.J. Allmendinger	Red Bull Racing Team	Toyota	474	0	running	58	$60,725
36	17	22	Dave Blaney	Bill Davis Racing	Toyota	439	0	running	55	$68,575
37	38	40	David Stremme	Chip Ganassi Racing with Felix Sabates	Dodge	410	0	crash	52	$60,450
38	36	4	Ward Burton	Morgan–McClure Motorsports	Chevrolet	406	0	running	49	$60,325
39	39	7	Robby Gordon	Robby Gordon Motorsports	Ford	390	0	running	46	$60,200
40	14	19	Elliott Sadler	Gillett Evernham Motorsports	Dodge	371	0	running	43	$78,420
41	28	41	Reed Sorenson	Chip Ganassi Racing with Felix Sabates	Dodge	259	0	engine	40	$67,930
42	8	18	J.J. Yeley	Joe Gibbs Racing	Chevrolet	258	0	engine	37	$87,713
43	27	01	Aric Almirola	Dale Earnhardt, Inc.	Chevrolet	111	0	electrical	34	$67,940
Failed to qualify
44		06	Sam Hornish, Jr.	Penske Racing South	Dodge					
45		78	Joe Nemechek	Furniture Row Racing	Chevrolet					
46		83	Brian Vickers	Red Bull Racing Team	Toyota					
47		36	Jeremy Mayfield	Bill Davis Racing	Toyota					
48		37	Kevin Lepage	Front Row Motorsports	Dodge					

== Points ==
Gordon's lead over Johnson in the standings was reduced to 58 points. (See 2007 Chase for the NEXTEL Cup) for complete Chase standings).

For 35th place, and the last guaranteed starting spot, the #22 team (driver Dave Blaney for Bill Davis Racing) extended its lead over the #21 team (Bill Elliott for Wood Brothers/JTG Racing) to 142 points.

Previous race: 2007 Bank of America 500	Nextel Cup Series; 2007 season	Next race: 2007 Pep Boys Auto 500
