= Bon Appétit =

American food and entertaining magazine

- October 2006 issue, highlighting the magazine's 50th anniversary
- Editor: Jamila Robinson
- Categories: Food and Entertaining
- Frequency: 10 issues per year
- Total circulation: 829,222 (Dec. 2023)
- Founded: December 1956; 69 years ago
- Company: Condé Nast Publications
- Country: United States
- Based in: New York City, New York
- Language: English
- Website: bonappetit.com
- ISSN: 0006-6990

Bon Appétit is a monthly American food and entertaining magazine, that typically contains recipes, entertaining ideas, restaurant recommendations, and wine reviews. Owned by Condé Nast, it is headquartered at the One World Trade Center in Manhattan, New York, and has been in publication since 1956. Bon Appétit has been recognized for increasing its online presence in recent years through the use of social media, publishing recipes on their website, and maintaining a popular YouTube channel.

== History ==
=== Early history (1956–2010) ===
Bon Appétit was started in 1956 as a liquor store giveaway and was first published as a bimonthly magazine in December of that year in Chicago. It was acquired by M. Frank Jones of Kansas City, Missouri, in 1965. Jones was owner, editor, and publisher until 1970, when he sold the magazine to the Pillsbury Company, who in turn sold it to Knapp Communications in 1975. Jones remained the editor of the magazine through both of these transfers. Knapp Communications also owned and published Architectural Digest, which was edited by Paige Rense. Jones recruited Rense to restructure Bon Appétit. She converted the magazine from a giveaway into a subscription-based, monthly magazine, as it remains today. Rense became the editor-in-chief in 1976. Condé Nast Publications, the current owners, purchased Knapp Communications in 1993. Bon Appétit's sister publication was Gourmet, before the latter was discontinued in October 2009.

=== Move to New York (2010–2019) ===
The magazine's headquarters was moved from Los Angeles to New York City in early 2011. Concurrent with the move, Barbara Fairchild, the editor since 2000, was succeeded by editor Adam Rapoport, who was previously the Style Editor at Condé Nast's GQ magazine. Prior to joining GQ, Rapoport edited the restaurant section at Time Out New York and worked as an editor and writer for the James Beard Foundation's publications office.

In 2011, Bon Appétit launched the "Bite me" advertising campaign, which had an estimated $500,000 budget that included print and online ads, billboards, posters, and sweepstakes. The ad campaign came after a period of "sluggish performance" following its sibling magazine Gourmet's cancellation in 2009, during which a limited number of readers and advertisers shifted to Bon Appétit. During the same period, other food magazines, such as Every Day With Rachael Ray and Food Network Magazine thrived. Bon Appétit sold 632 ad pages in 2012, which was a one percent increase from 625 ad pages sold in 2009 but a decline of 27 percent from the 867 ad pages sold in 2008. Condé Nast reported 1,452,953 paid subscriptions and 88,516 single copies in 2012 for the period ending November 2012. The median age of its audience was 48.4, of which 74% were female.

In August 2014, Condé Nast combined Bon Appétit and Epicurious into a single digital food platform led by Pamela Drucker Mann, Bon Appétit Senior Vice President and Publisher. Adam Rapoport was named Editorial Director of Epicurious.

Starting in the late 2010s, Bon Appétit was noted for increasing their web presence through the use of social media, their website, and their YouTube channel. From 2018 to 2019, Bon Appétit saw a 40 percent increase in video revenue and a 64 percent increase in subscriptions generated from digital channels such as social media plugs, podcasts, and newsletters. The company worked to leverage the popularity of Bon Appétit's YouTube and streaming channels towards increasing magazine readership. This included the November 2019 edition of the magazine, which had eight separate covers featuring the staff of the Bon Appétit Test Kitchen seen on the channels. As well, advertiser interest increased, with many companies being drawn to the connections the shows’ hosts have with their audience. These companies included Goose Island Beer, The Mushroom Council, Mitsubishi, Kerrygold and Glossier.

=== Racism allegations and fallout (2020–present) ===
On June 8, 2020, Adam Rapoport resigned as editor-in-chief after a photo of him in brownface was posted by food and wine writer Tammie Teclemariam on Twitter and sparked widespread criticism. Rapoport also received criticism after food editor Sohla El-Waylly accused the magazine of discriminating against employees of color, claiming they were subject to lesser pay than their non-minority counterparts. Amanda Shapiro took on the role of interim editor-in-chief soon after.

In an interview with Business Insider, Rapoport's former assistant Ryan Walker-Hartshorn, who is Black, stated that she had not been given a pay raise in almost 3 years with the company and was subject to numerous racist remarks and microaggressions, with a number of other employees of color agreeing that there was a "'toxic' culture of microaggression and exclusion" at the company. Vice President and Head of Programming and Lifestyle at Condé Nast, Matt Duckor, apologized and later resigned after past tweets seen as racist and homophobic were revealed, as well as accusations of being complicit or directly responsible for the pay disparities at the company.

In August 2020, two months after the initial fallout, several members of the Test Kitchen announced they would not be returning to film videos for the Bon Appétit YouTube channel due to a continued lack of progress in resolving issues at Condé Nast Entertainment. Additionally, Walker-Hartshorn and Jesse Sparks, the only two Black editorial staff members at Bon Appétit, quit on the same day. Dawn Davis, a Black woman, was named the new editor-in-chief on August 27, effective November 2, 2020. This followed the announcements of Sonia Chopra as the new executive editor and Marcus Samuelsson as a brand adviser and guest editor.

Condé Nast employees, including Bon Appétit employees, formed a union in September 2022.

Dawn Davis resigned in April 2023, and rejoined her former employer, Simon & Schuster. Her successor, Jamila Robinson, was named in 2024.

== YouTube channel ==
Bon Appétit
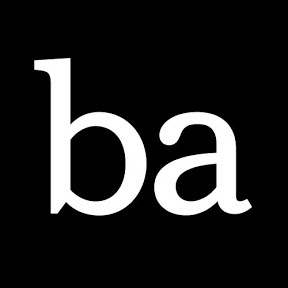

YouTube information
- Channel: Bon Appétit
- Years active: 2012–present
- Genres: Cooking; Educational; Travel
- Subscribers: 6.61 million
- Views: 1.9 billion
- Last updated: 7 July 2024

=== History ===
==== Beginnings and success (2012–2020) ====
In 2012, Bon Appétit launched a YouTube channel primarily featuring traditional "hands-and-pans" cooking tutorials.

On October 21, 2016, the first episode of It's Alive with Brad debuted. The series began with videos of Brad Leone, the Test Kitchen Manager at the time, in the Bon Appétit Test Kitchen demonstrating recipes for foods with microbial food cultures, but later moved on to more general recipes as well as outdoor segments at agricultural and food processing sites, including a cocoa farm, a sea salt harvesting facility, and a sausage factory. The series features a casual, unproduced style and comedic editing. The series was edited by Matt Hunziker and filmed and produced by Vincent Cross until Cross's departure in early 2019 to fellow cooking YouTube channel, Binging with Babish. It was subsequently filmed, produced, and edited by Hunziker, whose style has been credited with shaping the aesthetic of the entire Bon Appétit YouTube channel, including shaky cam-style filming, frequent cameos by non-featured chefs, and a focus on kitchen mistakes.

In July 2017, Gourmet Makes with Claire Saffitz debuted, in which Saffitz attempted to recreate or elevate popular snack foods such as Doritos, Twinkies, and Gushers. Gourmet Makes consistently trended on YouTube and developed a cult following on social media. Saffitz's work has been described as taking "junk food staples and...elevating them from their humble processed beginnings into wonders of gastronomy."

The loose and personality-driven style of It's Alive, along with Gourmet Makes, are noted as contrasting the "curated [and] posh" brand of Bon Appétit and were described by Forbes as having "changed the way Condé Nast approaches online video." As a result, in February 2019, Bon Appétit launched three new series on a streaming channel which took a more personality driven approach to their content: Bon Appétit’s Baking School, a spin-off of It’s Alive titled It’s Alive: Going Places, and Making Perfect. Bon Appétit’s Baking School was presented by Saffitz and taught the basics of baking a cake in a five-part series. The first season of It’s Alive: Going Places followed Leone as he traveled Central Texas, and was followed by a second season in June 2019 which followed Leone in Hawaii. The first season of Making Perfect starred Andy Baraghani, Molly Baz, Brad Leone, Chris Morocco, Carla Lalli Music, and Claire Saffitz, and focused on making the perfect pizza. It was followed by a second season in October 2019, with the additions of Christina Chaey and Rick Martinez. The second season focused on making the perfect Thanksgiving dinner.

==== Resignations and restructuring (2020–present) ====
After the resignation of editor-in-chief Adam Rapoport in June 2020 and the subsequent fallout regarding inequitable pay for staff and contributors of color, the channel became inactive and all members of the Test Kitchen stopped filming videos. Two months later, Rick Martinez, Sohla El-Waylly, and Priya Krishna announced they would be permanently leaving the Bon Appétit YouTube channel due to a continued lack of progress in resolving issues at Condé Nast Entertainment. Molly Baz, Gaby Melian, Carla Lalli Music, and Amiel Stanek made similar announcements soon after, followed by Claire Saffitz in October 2020. Later that month, the channel relaunched with a video helmed by the new leadership of Dawn Davis, Sonia Chopra, and Marcus Samuelsson, announcing seven new hosts: DeVonn Francis, Tiana “Tee” Gee, Melissa Miranda, Samantha Seneviratne, Christian “Chrissy” Tracey, Harold Villarosa, Rawlston Williams and Claudette Zepeda as well as the return of Brad Leone, Chris Morocco and Andy Baraghani.

=== Productions ===
The entire lineup of on-camera staff and contributors at Bon Appétit appear in the series From The Test Kitchen, which features more traditionally structured instructional recipe videos, as well as Test Kitchen Talks, with videos of the chefs competing in cooking challenges and answering common cooking questions. Several other series feature the individual chefs. Chris Morocco stars in Reverse Engineering, in which he attempts to reverse engineer a recipe by a celebrity chef from taste, touch, and smell alone. Carla Lalli Music starred in Back-to-Back Chef, in which she cooked along with and instructed a celebrity in preparing a dish while facing away from each other and using only verbal instructions. The series' guests included Natalie Portman, Antoni Porowski, Ninja, Miz Cracker, Braun Strowman and more. Additionally, chefs Bobby Flay, Daniel Boulud, and Gordon Ramsay have guest hosted the series.

Bon Appétit has filmed several collaborations with other notable YouTube channels, including First We Feast and Binging with Babish, with Sean Evans of Hot Ones and Andrew Rea of Binging with Babish appearing on multiple Bon Appétit series, and Bon Appétit personalities appearing on First We Feast and Binging with Babish's respective series. El-Waylly's first appearance on YouTube after the Bon Appétit YouTube channel became inactive was teaching Rea to temper chocolate, before eventually moving entirely to the Babish Culinary Universe with her own show titled Stump Sohla. Several other guests have appeared on It's Alive, including Elias Cairo of Olympia Provisions, chef Matty Matheson, chef Samin Nosrat, and musician Orville Peck.

Videos are produced by Condé Nast Entertainment and were filmed in the Bon Appétit Test Kitchen on the 35th floor of the One World Trade Center in Manhattan, where it is part of Condé Nast's headquarters. Following the onset of the COVID-19 pandemic, videos were filmed at individual chefs' homes and other filming locations. Bon Appétit won the 2020 Webby Award for Food & Drink in the category Social and 2020 Webby Award and Webby People's Voice Award for Food & Drink in the category Web.

=== Bon Appétit staff and contributors on YouTube channel ===
==== Current ====
Member	Title	Show(s)	Tenure
Chris Morocco	Test Kitchen Director; Former Deputy Food Editor	Reverse Engineering; Making Perfect	February 2011 – July 2013; February 2015 – present
Dan Siegel	Video Director	Gourmet Makes; Reverse Engineering; Making Perfect; Back-to-Back Chef; BA's Baking School	December 2018 – present

==== Former ====
Member	Title	Show(s)	Tenure
Andy Baraghani	Senior Food Editor	Andy Explores; Making Perfect	October 2015 – August 2021
Molly Baz	Senior Food Editor	Molly Tries; Making Perfect	March 2018 – October 2020
Christina Chaey	Senior Food Editor	Making Perfect	December 2014 – August 2016; October 2017 – September 2022
Alex Delany	Drinks Editor	Alex Eats It All; One of Everything	August 2014 – February 2021
Sohla El-Waylly	Assistant Food Editor		August 2019 – October 2020
Matt Hunziker	Editor and Video Director	It's Alive	August 2016 – October 2022
Priya Krishna	Contributing Writer		2018 – August 2020
Brad Leone	Former Test Kitchen Manager Test Kitchen Video Host	It's Alive; It's Alive: Going Places; Making Perfect	September 2011 – December 2022
Rick Martinez	Contributing Food Editor	Making Perfect	July 2015 – November 2016; November 2016 – Present (as contributor)
Gaby Melian	Test Kitchen Manager		June 2016 – November 2020
Carla Lalli Music	Former Food Director; Food Editor at Large	Back-to-Back Chef; Making Perfect	August 2011 – December 2019; December 2019 – November 2020 (as contributor)
Claire Saffitz	Contributing Food Editor	Gourmet Makes; BA's Baking School; Making Perfect	2013 – August 2018; November 2018 – May 2020 (as contributor)
Amiel Stanek	Editor at Large	Almost Every; 12 Types	Present

== Podcasts ==
Bon Appétit Foodcast
- Genre: Food & Drink

Cast and voices
- Hosted by: Adam Rapoport

Production
- Production: Emma Wartzman; Producer
- Length: 30–60 minutes

Publication
- No. of episodes: 275
- Original release: November 24, 2014 – June 17, 2020
- Updates: Weekly; Ep. 13 onward

Related
- Website: Bon Appétit Foodcast

In 2014, Bon Appétit launched a podcast titled the Bon Appétit Foodcast. The series was hosted by former editor-in-chief Adam Rapoport, and featured notable guests such as Ina Garten, Gordon Ramsay, and Mark Bittman. A number of the staff at Bon Appétit regularly appeared on the podcast to discuss their recently published recipes. On June 17, 2020, a final podcast was released, announcing that in light of the departure of Rapoport and the ensuing fall out, the podcast would have a new host and a new name, as well as feature a greater range of contributors and developers. On June 10, 2021, a new podcast was launched on the same podcast feed, titled Bon Appétit Healthyish. The podcast was planned to be a six-episode miniseries hosted by Amanda Shapiro. After the six episodes, the podcast was again renamed on August 19, 2021, to Food People, and was still hosted by Shapiro.

== Best New Restaurants in America ==
Since 2009, Bon Appétit's editors, including Andrew Knowlton, Senior Editor Julia Kramer, and Amiel Stanek, have put together a list of the "Best New Restaurants in America". The list is released annually at the end of August for the September issue, and begins with a 50-restaurant shortlist that is then narrowed down to "The Hot 10" list. The first two years, the list was not in a specific order. Due to the impact of the COVID-19 pandemic on the food industry, no list was released in 2020. In September 2021, it was announced that there would not be any list for a second year in a row, with a "Heads of the Table" list released in its place. The list featured restaurants, chefs, and organizations that worked to benefit their communities and those most impacted by the COVID-19 pandemic.

Best New Restaurant Rankings (2009, 2010)
Year	–	–	–	–	–	–	–	–	–	–
2009	Bar Jules (San Francisco, California)	Cakes & Ale (Decatur, Georgia)	Feast (Houston, Texas)	Hungry Mother (Cambridge, Massachusetts)	Mado (Chicago, Illinois)	No. 7 (Brooklyn, New York)	Olivia (Austin, Texas)	Spring Hill (Seattle, Washington)	The Greenhouse Tavern (Cleveland, Ohio)	Woodberry Kitchen (Baltimore, Maryland)
2010	Anchovies & Olives (Seattle, Washington)	Bar La Grassa (Minneapolis, Minnesota)	Ellerbe Fine Foods (Fort Worth, Texas)	Frances (San Francisco, California)	Hatfield's (Los Angeles, California)	Laurelhurst Market (Portland, Oregon)	Marea (New York, New York)	Menton (Boston, Massachusetts)	Miller Union (Atlanta, Georgia)	The Purple Pig (Chicago, Illinois)

Best New Restaurant Rankings (2011–present)
Year	1	2	3	4	5	6	7	8	9	10
2011	Husk (Charleston, South Carolina)	Mission Chinese Food (San Francisco, California)	The Walrus and the Carpenter (Seattle, Washington)	Travail Kitchen and Amusements (Robbinsdale, Minnesota)	Ruxbin (Chicago, Illinois)	Talula's Garden (Philadelphia, Pennsylvania)	Son of a Gun (Los Angeles, California)	M. Wells (Long Island City, New York)	Congress (Austin, Texas)	Bondir (Cambridge, Massachusetts)
2012	State Bird Provisions (San Francisco, California)	Blanca (Brooklyn, New York)	Battersby (Brooklyn, New York)	Luce (Portland, Oregon)	The Catbird Seat (Nashville, Tennessee)	The Bachelor Farmer & Marvel Bar (Minneapolis, Minnesota)	Little Serow (Washington, D.C.)	Oxheart (Houston, Texas)	Bäco Mercat (Los Angeles, California)	Cakes & Ale (Decatur, Georgia)
2013	Alma (Los Angeles, California)	Saison (San Francisco, California)	Rolf and Daughters (Nashville, Tennessee)	Fat Rice (Chicago, Illinois)	Ava Gene's (Portland, Oregon)	The Pass & Provisions (Houston, Texas)	The Optimist (Atlanta, Georgia)	Jeffrey's & Josephine House (Austin, Texas)	The Whale Wins & Joule (Seattle, Washington)	Aska (Brooklyn, New York)
2014	Rose's Luxury (Washington, D.C.)	High Street on Market (Philadelphia, Pennsylvania)	Estela (New York, New York)	Tosca Cafe (San Francisco, California)	Westward (Seattle, Washington)	Central Provisions (Portland, Maine)	Hot Joy (San Antonio, Texas)	Thai-Kun (Austin, Texas)	Måurice Luncheonette (Portland, Oregon)	Grand Central Market (Los Angeles, California)
2015	AL's Place (San Francisco, California)	Gjusta (Los Angeles, California)	Petit Trois (Los Angeles, California)	Semilla (Brooklyn, New York)	Parachute (Chicago, Illinois)	Dai Due (Austin, Texas)	Kindred (Davidson, North Carolina)	Rintaro (San Francisco, California)	Manolin (Seattle, Washington)	Milktooth (Indianapolis, Indiana)
2016	Staplehouse (Atlanta, Georgia)	Bad Saint (Washington, D.C.)	Lord Stanley (San Francisco, California)	Morcilla (Pittsburgh, Pennsylvania)	Baroo (Los Angeles, California)	South Philly Barbacoa (Philadelphia, Pennsylvania)	Oberlin (Providence, Rhode Island)	Wildair (New York, New York)	Buxton Hall (Asheville, North Carolina)	N7 (New Orleans, Louisiana)
2017	Turkey and the Wolf (New Orleans)	Elske (Chicago, Illinois)	Mister Jiu's (San Francisco, California)	Palizzi Social Club (Philadelphia, Pennsylvania)	Hart's (Brooklyn, New York)	Giant (Chicago, Illinois)	Spring (Marietta, Georgia)	Kemuri Tatsu-Ya (Austin, Texas)	Nixta (St. Louis, Missouri)	Brewery Bhavana (Raleigh, North Carolina)
2018	Nonesuch (Oklahoma City, Oklahoma)	Maydan (Washington, D.C.)	Ugly Baby (Brooklyn, New York)	Freedman's (Los Angeles, California)	Nyum Bai (Oakland, California)	Nimblefish (Portland, Oregon)	Che Fico (San Francisco, California)	Yume Ga Arukara (Cambridge, Massachusetts)	Drifters Wife (Portland, Maine)	Call (Denver, Colorado)
2019	Konbi (Los Angeles, California)	Khao Noodle Shop (Dallas, Texas)	Longoven (Richmond, Virginia)	Ochre Bakery (Detroit. Michigan)	The Elysian Bar (New Orleans, Louisiana)	Kopitiam (New York City, New York)	Tailor (Nashville, Tennessee)	Le Comptoir Du Vin (Baltimore, Maryland)	Matt's BBQ Tacos (Portland, Oregon)	The Wolf's Tailor (Denver, Colorado)

== Editors-in-chief ==
- James A. Shanahan (1956–1961)
- Alan Shearer (1961–1962)
- Charles Walters (1962–1963)
- Betty Paige (1963–1964)
- W. C. Carreras (1964)
- Floyd Sageser (1964–1965)
- M. Frank Jones (1965–1976)
- Paige Rense (1976–1983)
- Marilou Vaughan (1983–1985)
- William J. Garry (1985–2000)
- Barbara Fairchild (2000–2010)
- Adam Rapoport (2010–2020)
- Amanda Shapiro (2020) (Interim Editor)
- Dawn Davis (November 2020–April 2023)
- Jamila Robinson (August 2023–Present)

== See also ==
- Las Vegas Uncork'd
- List of food and drink magazines
