= Chris Morocco =

American chef and YouTube personality

- Born: February 26, 1980 (age 46)
- Education: Oberlin College; French Culinary Institute
- Culinary career
- Television show(s): Reverse Engineering Making Perfect

Christopher Morocco (born February 26, 1980) is an American chef and YouTube personality. He is the test kitchen director at Bon Appétit and is known for his appearances in videos produced for the magazine's YouTube channel, most notably as the host of Reverse Engineering.

== Early life and education ==
Morocco grew up in Newton, Massachusetts and attended Newton South High School. After graduating from high school, he took a gap year before attending Oberlin College where he majored in French and worked as a cook at Pyle Inn.

After graduation, Morocco worked at Vogue as a production manager, before taking classes at the French Culinary Institute and being hired to work in the test kitchen at Bon Appétit. He left the magazine to work for the editorial department of Real Simple, before returning to Bon Appétit as the magazine's deputy food editor.

== Career ==
Morocco first appeared in videos on the Bon Appétit YouTube channel in 2017, as part of a broader effort by the magazine to increase its YouTube presence. He would make regular appearances in instructional cooking videos and in Gourmet Makes hosted by Claire Saffitz, with Jezebel describing Morocco as the "most patient of the crew who possesses the most trustworthy taste buds."

In 2019, he became the host of Reverse Engineering, a web series on the Bon Appétit YouTube channel that follows Morocco as he uses his supertaster ability to reverse engineer a recipe by a celebrity chef from taste, touch, and smell alone. The recipes attempted by Morocco on Reverse Engineering include Gordon Ramsay's Beef Wellington and Jamie Oliver's insanity burger.

== Personal life ==
Morocco resides in Brooklyn, New York, with his wife and two children.
