= Kate Williams (chef) =

American chef and restaurateur

- Born: 1984 or 1985 (age 40–41); Detroit, Michigan, US
- Education: Michigan State University; French Culinary Institute
- Culinary career
- Previous restaurants: Lady of the House; Republic Tavern; Parks & Rec Diner; Rodin

Kate Williams is a chef and restaurateur in Detroit, Michigan, US. She was chef and restaurateur for Lady of the House in Detroit's Corktown neighborhood. In 2018 Food + Wine named her one of America's best new chefs and GQ and Esquire named the restaurant to their lists of best new restaurants. Lady of the House closed in 2021 during the COVID-19 pandemic.

== Early life ==
Williams was born in 1985 in Detroit to parents who were also from Detroit. She studied food science at Michigan State University. She received a culinary degree from the French Culinary Institute.

== Career ==
Williams served as sous chef for Wolfgang Puck in Chicago and worked in restaurants in New York and at Restaurant Relæ in Copenhagen. She was living in New York and working in restaurants when she came home to attend a funeral and "decided this is the only place I want to have a restaurant". She returned to Detroit and helped open Republic Tavern and Parks & Rec Diner, serving as Executive Chef for Republic and Rodin before opening Lady of the House.

=== Lady of the House ===
The restaurant opened in September 2017 in Detroit's Corktown neighborhood in a 1970s building that was previously home to St. Cece's, an Irish pub. It is open Tuesday through Sunday for dinner and, since February 2018, on Saturday and Sunday for brunch. Some of the dinnerware had belonged to Williams' grandmother. Childhood photos of restaurant employees hang in a hallway.

According to Food + Wine it is a "no-waste kitchen". Williams uses trim from prime rib to make tartare.

Diners are sometimes disappointed when a dish they've read about is unavailable due to the seasonal nature of Williams' menu. One of Williams' signature dishes is a "carrot steak", a large carrot shaved into thin slices, salted, rolled into a rosette, and basted in butter. It requires large carrots, so is available only at times of year when local farmers are producing them.

Williams' initial vision was to build a neighborhood restaurant "that feels like it's been there forever". She wanted a restaurant "small enough that I am cooking every day and not just doing paperwork".

The restaurant closed in 2021 during the COVID-19 pandemic.

== Recognition ==
In 2018 Food + Wine named her one of America's best new chefs, one of only three Michigan chefs since the magazine started the list. The same year, GQ and Esquire named the restaurant to their lists of the year's best new restaurants. The restaurant was a semifinalist for the James Beard Foundation Award for best new restaurant in the country.

In 2019 she was a semifinalist for a James Beard Foundation Award for best chef in the Great Lakes.

Industry journal Restaurant Hospitality called her "the poster child for Detroit's rising food scene". The Chicago Tribune said her food showed "pure mastery". The New York Times called it "seasonal-voluptuous".

== Philanthropy ==
Williams works with Alternatives for Girls, which helps homeless and at-risk girls and young women. She teaches cooking classes on preparing inexpensive, healthy meals.

== Personal life ==
Williams has lived in Corktown since 2014. She has family connections to Corktown and Detroit. Her paternal grandfather once lived a few blocks from the restaurant's location. Her maternal grandparents met at the Gaelic League, located around the corner. A great-great-grandfather ran a bakery in Detroit's West Village neighborhood.
