= Indian-ish =

2019 cookbook by Priya Krishna

- Authors: Priya Krishna
- Language: English
- Subject: Cookbook
- Publisher: Harvest
- Publication date: April 23, 2019
- Publication place: America
- Media type: Print, ebook
- Pages: 256
- ISBN: 9781328482471

Indian-ish: Recipes and Antics from a Modern American Family is a cookbook by Indian-American author and food critic Priya Krishna in 2019. It consists of a variety of recipes from the Indian cuisine.

The book contains a foreword by Padma Lakshmi. Priya co-wrote the book with her mother Ritu Krishna.
