= Travis London =

American chef and interior designer

- Born: Los Angeles, California, U.S.
- Education: French Culinary Institute
- Culinary career
- Award
- Modern Luxury Interiors South Florida "Ones To Watch" 2022
- Website: https://www.studiolondon.com/

Travis London is an American celebrity chef-turned-interior designer, television host, writer, and event planner. London owns bi-coastal design firm Studio London Co. He was born in Los Angeles and resides in Miami. London is of both Mexican and African American descent.

== Career ==
At 16, London began throwing parties for his friends, which eventually landed him on "Page Six" as a "party-going L.A. hipster". By the time he received formal training at the French Culinary Institute, he had secured a food column in OK! Magazine and had prepared dishes for his celebrity friends Justin Timberlake, Mary-Kate Olsen, and former love interest Rihanna"

Travis is the founder of Healthy Chic Eats, and has appeared on the Today Show, Fox and Friends and the Suzanne Somers Show. Travis is a weekly contributor to OK! Magazine and in 2012 was brand ambassador for X Rated Fusion Liqueur.

Travis has been featured in OK! Magazine, Us Weekly, The New York Daily News, The Huffington Post, The Sun Post Weekly, Uptown Magazine, Vibe, Shape, Latina, Cosmopolitan, Venue, and the Miami Herald.

== Cooking Influences ==
Travis' African-American grandfather, who was from Georgia, and Mexican maternal grandmother, taught Travis how to raise chickens, cook collard greens, and master homemade tamales. London credits his approach to eating healthy as being influenced by growing up with his mother being overweight. He has stated that at 13 he discovered healthy meals for his mother while watching Suzanne Somers on the Home Shopping Network.

== Personal life ==
London has dated Rihanna and Mary-Kate Olsen. He and Bruce Douglas Patrick, who is a retired tax lawyer for Exxon and other companies, were married on November 4, 2023.
