= Hooni Kim =

Korean American Chef

Hooni Kim is a Korean American chef who won the James Beard Award in 2026 for Best Chef: New York State. Kim's restaurant - Danji - was the first Korean restaurant in the world to receive a Michelin Star.

== Early Life and Education ==
Kim was born in Seoul, South Korea. Kim pursued medical school but then enrolled at the French Culinary Institute. He graduated from the French Culinary Institute in 2005.

== Career ==
In 2010, Kim opened his restaurant Danji in West 52nd Street. In 2012, Danji became the first Korean restaurant in the world to receive a Michelin star. Before opening Danji, Kim worked at various restaurants around New York City, including Masa and Daniel.

In December 2012, Kim opened another restaurant called Hanjan, which took inspiration from Korean taverns and was located in the Flatiron District.

In 2014, Kim was a guest judge on the television show MasterChef Korea.

In early 2020, Kim's cookbook My Korea was published. Later that same year, Kim had to close Hanjan due to the COVID-19 pandemic.

In April 2023, Kim was also at risk of closing Danji because a business in the same building had a fire and the New York City Department of Buildings issued a vacate order for the building, which meant that Kim could not operate Danji until the order was lifted. Kim was able to reopened Danji in November 2024.

In 2022, Kim opened a store called the Little Banchan Shop, located in Long Island City, Queens, that sold housemade banchan. In the back of the Little Banchan Shop is Kim's restaurant Meju, which focuses on highlighting fermentation.

In May 2026, The New York Times ranked Kim's Meju fourth on its list of the New York City's 100 best restaurants. In June 2026, Kim won the James Beard Award in 2026 for Best Chef: New York State.

== External Sources ==
- Hooni Kim's Recipie for Bulgogi Sliders With Scallion Salsa in The New York Times
- Interview with Hooni Kim in The Queens Ledger
