= Carla Lalli Music =

American chef and former YouTube personality

Carla Lalli
- Born: Los Angeles, California, U.S.
- Occupations: Chef, cookbook author, Youtube personality
- Education: Brown University; French Culinary Institute
- Culinary career
- Television shows
- Back-to-Back Chef; Making Perfect; Carla’s Cooking Show; You Got Snack'd
- Spouse: Fernando Music (divorced)
- Children: 2
- Relatives: Lorenzo Music (former father-in-law)

Carla Lalli is an American chef, cookbook author, and former YouTube personality. She was a food editor at large of Bon Appétit and was known for her appearances in videos produced for the magazine's YouTube channel, most notably as the host of Back-to-Back Chef. Lalli left the magazine in 2020 after alleging that Bon Appétit and Condé Nast Entertainment had engaged in racial discrimination. Before joining Bon Appétit, she worked as a line chef, as the first general manager of Shake Shack, and as an editor for Everyday Food.

== Early life and education ==
Lalli was born to an Italian-American family, where her mother worked as a food critic at New West and as a cookbook editor at Simon & Schuster. Lalli studied at Brown University, where she graduated with a degree in Modern Culture and Media in 1994, and later attended the French Culinary Institute.

== Career ==
She worked in food service for over a decade, notably as a line chef and later kitchen manager for Rocco DiSpirito, as the first general manager of Shake Shack, and as an instructor in culinary management at the Institute for Culinary Education. She transitioned to food writing in 2009, and served as an editor for Everyday Food until 2011. Lalli was hired as a features editor for Bon Appétit that same year, and was later promoted to be the magazine's food director. In January 2020, she moved her role to food editor at large to focus on her 2nd cookbook.

Lalli first appeared in videos on the Bon Appétit YouTube channel in 2015 and would make regular appearances in recipe preparation videos in the subsequent years. In 2018, Lalli became the host of Back-to-Back Chef, a web series in which she instructs a celebrity in preparing a dish while facing away from each other and using only verbal instructions. Notable guests on the series have included Natalie Portman, Michael Shannon, and Elizabeth Olsen. The series has been praised for its comedic timing and Lalli’s hosting, with Vulture calling the Back-to-Back Chef "simple, elegant, and absolutely genius." Lalli was also featured in the series Test Kitchen Talks, From the Test Kitchen, and Making Perfect.

In August 2020, two months after the resignation of editor-in-chief Adam Rapoport and the subsequent fallout regarding inequitable pay for staff and contributors of color, several members of the Test Kitchen, including Lalli, announced they would no longer film videos for the Bon Appétit YouTube channel due to a continued lack of progress in resolving issues at Condé Nast Entertainment.

A cookbook by Lalli, Where Cooking Begins: Uncomplicated Recipes to Make You a Great Cook, was published by Penguin Random House on March 19, 2019. In May 2020, the cookbook earned the 2020 James Beard Foundation Book Award in the category "General". Lalli announced she was working on a second cookbook in October 2019.

In November 2020, Lalli launched her own video series called Carla’s Cooking Show which is limited to her Patreon subscribers. In December 2020, Lalli launched a new collaborative Instagram Live series with Bon Appétit alumna Molly Baz called You Got Snack'd.

Lalli’s second cookbook, That Sounds So Good: 100 Real-Life Recipes for Every Day of the Week, was released in October 2021, along with a new corresponding weekly YouTube series. Each weekly episode featured Lalli cooking a recipe from the book. In 2025, Lalli stopped posting on YouTube because it was not profitable.

== Works ==
=== Books ===
- Music, Carla Lalli (2019). Where cooking begins : uncomplicated recipes to make you a great cook. New York. ISBN 978-0-525-57334-0. OCLC 1042103656.
- Music, Carla Lalli; Gentl, Andrea; Hyers, Martin (2021). That sounds so good : 100 real-life recipes for every day of the week. New York. ISBN 978-0-593-13825-0. OCLC 1221016314.

=== Web shows and series ===
List of appearances in web shows and series
Year	Title	Role	Notes
August 2017 – December 2019	Back-to-Back Chef	Former Food Director, Food Editor at Large	1 season
June 2019 – June 2020	Test Kitchen Talks	Former Food Director, Food Editor at Large	2 seasons
December 2019 – November 2020 (as contributor)	Making Perfect	Former Food Director, Food Editor at Large	2 seasons
November 2020 – present	Carla’s Cooking Show	Herself	Ongoing Patreon series
December 2020 – present	You Got Snack'd	Herself	Ongoing Instagram Live series
October 2021 – January 2025	That Sounds So Good	Herself	YouTube series

== Personal life ==
Lalli resides in Fort Greene, Brooklyn and has two children. She is divorced. She was the daughter-in-law of actor Lorenzo Music, who was the original voice of Jim Davis' comic strip character Garfield. He also starred as Carlton the Doorman on the sitcom Rhoda.
