= International Culinary Center =

Defunct cooking school

Coordinates: 40.720959°N 74.000538°W

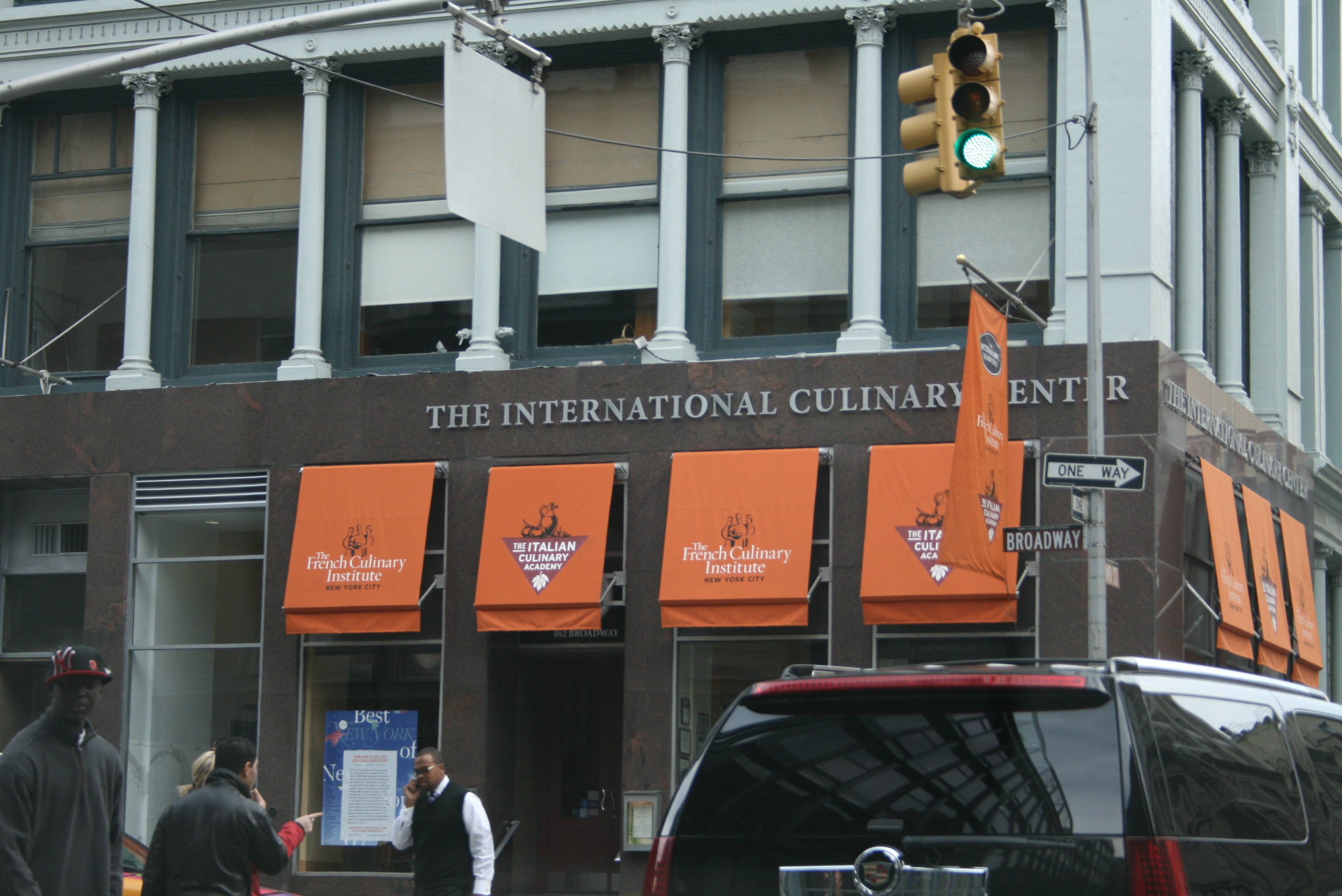
- The International Culinary Center; 462 Broadway, New York
- Type: Private for-profit culinary school
- Active: 1984–2020
- Website: internationalculinarycenter.com

The International Culinary Center (originally known as the French Culinary Institute) was a private for-profit culinary school from 1984 to 2020 headquartered in New York City, New York. The facilities included professional kitchens for hands-on cooking and baking classes, wine tasting classrooms, a library, theater, and event spaces. The school merged with the Institute of Culinary Education in 2020.

== History ==
The International Culinary Center was founded by Dorothy Cann Hamilton in 1984 as the French Culinary Institute. When the school first opened, it was visited by chef Julia Child, who reportedly arranged to have the school profiled on Good Morning America one week later.

In 2020, the International Culinary Center combined with the Institute of Culinary Education, citing issues related to the COVID-19 pandemic for its closure.

== Locations ==
The International Culinary Center had two campuses, one in New York City and the other in the San Francisco Bay area. The New York City location included the L'Ecole restaurant on the ground floor as well as a Culinary Theater that hosted events, forums, and lectures from graduates. The International Culinary Center was also home to FCI Catering & Events, which created and catered both on- and off-premises private events. Its California location opened in 2011 in Campbell, in the San Francisco Bay Area. The facilities consisted of kitchens, a library, theaters, an event space and a wine tasting room. The facility was the former location of the Professional Culinary Institute.

== Notable alumni ==
- Angie Mar
- Antonia Lofaso
- Bobby Flay, alumnus of the 1st class in 1984
- Carla Lalli Music
- Chris Morocco
- Christina Tosi
- Dan Barber
- David Chang
- Gilat Bennett
- Kate Williams
- Hooni Kim
- Isa Souza
- Lara Trump
- Lee Anne Wong
- Serge Madikians
- Travis London
- Wylie Dufresne
