= Las Vegas Uncork'd =

Annual culinary and wine event in Nevada

Las Vegas Uncork'd (also referred to as Vegas Uncork'd and Vegas Uncorked) was an annual culinary and wine event in Las Vegas, Nevada. The concept was developed by the Las Vegas Convention and Visitors Authority, their advertising agency R&R Partners and Las Vegas resort partners who originally considered a number of magazine partners such as Bon Appétit, Food & Wine and Gourmet. Bon Appétit was selected as the magazine partner after a review with each magazine. The event was launched in 2007 by the Las Vegas Convention and Visitors Authority, Bon Appétit magazine led by Editor-in-Chief Barbara Fairchild and co-creator and Executive Director Rob O'Keefe who led the first five years of development of what Eater.com called "the world's most innovative culinary event". Las Vegas resort partners over the years included Bellagio, Caesars Palace and Wynn Las Vegas, MGM Grand, Mandalay Bay, The Venetian, Las Vegas and The Palazzo and each year the event featured more than 80 celebrated chefs and over 25 events occurring over a spectacular four-day weekend.

Signature events over the years have included a poolside Grand Tasting presenting nearly 60 restaurants and more than 100 wines; an intimate interview of Wolfgang Puck by Bon Appétit Editor-in-Chief Barbara Fairchild; an after-hours blackjack tournament; Masters' Series dinners; a late-night sake tasting and celebration of contemporary Tokyo's hip, urban culture; an interactive luncheon allowing guests to, with the guidance of top-tier chefs, prepare their own lunch; wine immersion seminars and a gala Fashion Feast, which paired haute cuisine with contemporary fashion.

Participating chefs have included:

- Alain Ducasse
- Alex Stratta
- Joël Robuchon
- Francois Payard
- Rick Moonen
- Kerry Simon
- Hubert Keller
- Pierre Gagnaire
- Cat Cora
- Bobby Flay
- Wolfgang Puck
- Michael Mina
- Todd English
- Guy Savoy
- Tom Colicchio
- Gordon Ramsay

News coverage for the event has ranged from the CBS Early Show to coverage in Le Point to culinary blogs such as Eater.com.

According to a spokesperson for the Las Vegas Convention and Visitors Authority, after running for 13 years, the culinary event would not be returning to the Strip.
