= The Big Brunch =

American cooking competition television series

- Genre: Reality television
- Created by: Dan Levy
- Presented by: Dan Levy
- Judges: Dan Levy; Sohla El-Waylly; Will Guidara
- Country of origin: United States
- Original language: English
- No. of seasons: 1
- No. of episodes: 8

Production
- Executive producers: Dan Levy; Andrew Fried; Dane Lillegard; Sarina Roma; Jordan Wynn; Faye Stapleton
- Production companies: Boardwalk Pictures; Not a Real Company Productions

Original release
- Network: HBO Max
- Release: November 10 – November 24, 2022

The Big Brunch is an American cooking competition television series hosted by Dan Levy for HBO Max.

Levy serves as judge along with Sohla El-Waylly and Will Guidara. Executive producers are Levy, Andrew Fried, Sarina Roma, Dane Lillegard and Faye Stapleton of Boardwalk Pictures.

== Premise ==
The series pits 10 chefs against each other for a cash prize of $300,000. Each chef has a specific project or business in mind for these funds, and each chef is featured throughout the season to have a closer look at their goals.

== Cast ==
- Dan Levy - Host and Judge
- Sohla El-Waylly - Judge
- Will Guidara - Judge

| Contestant | Hometown | Progress |
|---|---|---|
| Daniel Harthausen | Richmond, Va. | WINNER |
| J Chong | Asheville, N.C. | Runner-Up |
| Danielle Sepsy | Garden City, N.Y. | Runner-Up |
| Roman Wilcox | El Paso, Tex. | 4th/5th Place |
| Antwon Brinson | Charlottesville, Va. | 4th/5th Place |
| Mason Zeglen | Surfside Beach, S.C. | 6th Place |
| Catie Randazzo | Los Angeles, Ca. | 7th Place |
| Kip Poole | Norfolk, Va. | 8th Place |
| Nadege Fleurimond | Brooklyn, N.Y. | 9th Place |
| Kelly Jones | Brooklyn, N.Y. | 10th Place |
