= Gaby Melian =

Argentinian chef and food writer (born 1969/70)

- Born: 1969 or 1970 (age 56–57); Buenos Aires, Argentina
- Occupations: Chef; cookbook author
- Notable work: Food-Related Stories; Gaby's Latin American Kitchen
- Website: gabyskitchen.com

Gaby Melian (born 1969 or 1970) is an Argentinian chef and cookbook author. After completing college, Melian moved from Argentina to New York City, where she attended the Institute of Culinary Education and worked as a chef and in various roles in culinary education. Around 2016, she joined Bon Appétit magazine to work in the test kitchen and later become test kitchen manager, appearing in videos for the magazine's YouTube channel until 2020. She has since released a memoir, Food-Related Stories, and a children's cookbook of Latino foods, Gaby's Latin American Kitchen.

== Biography ==
Gaby Melian was born in Buenos Aires, Argentina in 1969 or 1970, and was raised there. She recalls that, starting at the age of 8, she spent much of her time growing up assisting her family in the kitchen, where she helped prepare food, tried different ingredients, and fell in love with food. Her grandmother Porota taught her how to cook. After her grandmother taught her to crimp empanadas, she became the family's "crimping expert" and would assist in making empanadas for parties.

Melian later earned a degree in journalism. While she was in college, her father, an artisan, would create silver and leather goods to sell in outdoor marketplaces, where she would often sell food to the other vendors. After completing college, she relocated to New York City with the goal of working for a Spanish publication. She enrolled at the Institute of Culinary Education in 2003, after discovering their work study program, and completed programs in culinary management (2005), culinary arts (2005), and pastry arts (2006). According to her personal website, she worked at the Institute of Culinary Education as a chef assistant and was a chef instructor for New York-based organizations City Harvest and The Cooking Room. In addition to other jobs in culinary education, she has held "many other jobs as a teacher, waitress, babysitter, organizer, and space designer".

After Melian's mother died from cancer in January 2016, she decided to put a hold on her business ventures and look for work. She was then employed at Bon Appétit magazine as a test kitchen assistant and then the test kitchen manager. In August 2020, two months after the resignation of editor-in-chief Adam Rapoport and the subsequent fallout regarding inequitable pay for staff and contributors of color, Melian and several other members of the Bon Appétit Test Kitchen announced they would no longer film videos for the Bon Appétit YouTube channel as discussions with Condé Nast Entertainment regarding pay remained unresolved.

Starting in 2020, Melian has focused on publishing content on her YouTube channel, Gaby's Kitchen, according to her personal website. In 2022, she published a memoir and a children's cookbook of Latino foods.

== Writing ==
Melian's memoir Food-Related Stories was published by Penguin Workshop in January 2022. It is part of the Pocket Change Collective series of books illustrated by Ashley Lukashevsky. The book contains stories of her culinary career and "how food has always been present in all my battles", and it was written for young adult readers.

In late 2022, Melian released a children's cookbook of Latino foods titled Gaby's Latin American Kitchen: 70 Kid-Tested and Kid-Approved Recipes for Young Chefs. It contains recipes from her childhood and those she learned after she came to the United States. It is part of the series of books associated with the cooking show America's Test Kitchen. The book was nominated for a 2023 IACP Award in the Children & Family category.

== Personal life ==
As of 2023, Melian resides in Jersey City, New Jersey with her pet dog, Pucho.
