= Serge Madikians =

Serge Madikians is a chef based in the Hudson Valley of New York. He owned and cooked at Serevan, a restaurant located in Amenia, a town in the east of Dutchess County, New York.

== Family background and personal life ==
Madikians was born in Tehran, Iran to Armenian parents. He came to the U.S. in 1978 with his brother to avoid the Iranian Revolution. He completed his undergraduate degree majoring in history and philosophy. Later, he moved to New York and earned a master's degree in public policy and economics at The New School.

== Professional career ==
Madikians graduated from the French Culinary Institute in 1998. Upon graduating, he worked in the kitchen of Jean-Georges Vongerichten during a year-long externship. Afterward he worked at David Bouley's Danube. Madikians said of the experience "The artistry, craftsmanship and cooking at Danube really helped me formulate a sensibility of my own." Madikians then became the executive chef at a Moroccan restaurant in New York City named Chez es Saada. In the spring of 2002, he became the executive chef at a small eatery in Bovina, New York. There he gained a reputation for innovative use of fresh, local ingredients.

On May 5, 2005, Madikians opened up Serevan. The name Serevan is an adaptation of Lake Sevan located in Armenia. The restaurant closed in 2024.

== Awards ==
- Best Chef in the Hudson Valley in 2008
- Best Chef in the Hudson Valley in 2009
- James Beard Award Semifinalist in 2011
- James Beard Award Semifinalist in 2012
