= Choco Taco =

Ice cream novelty previously made by Good Humor-Breyers

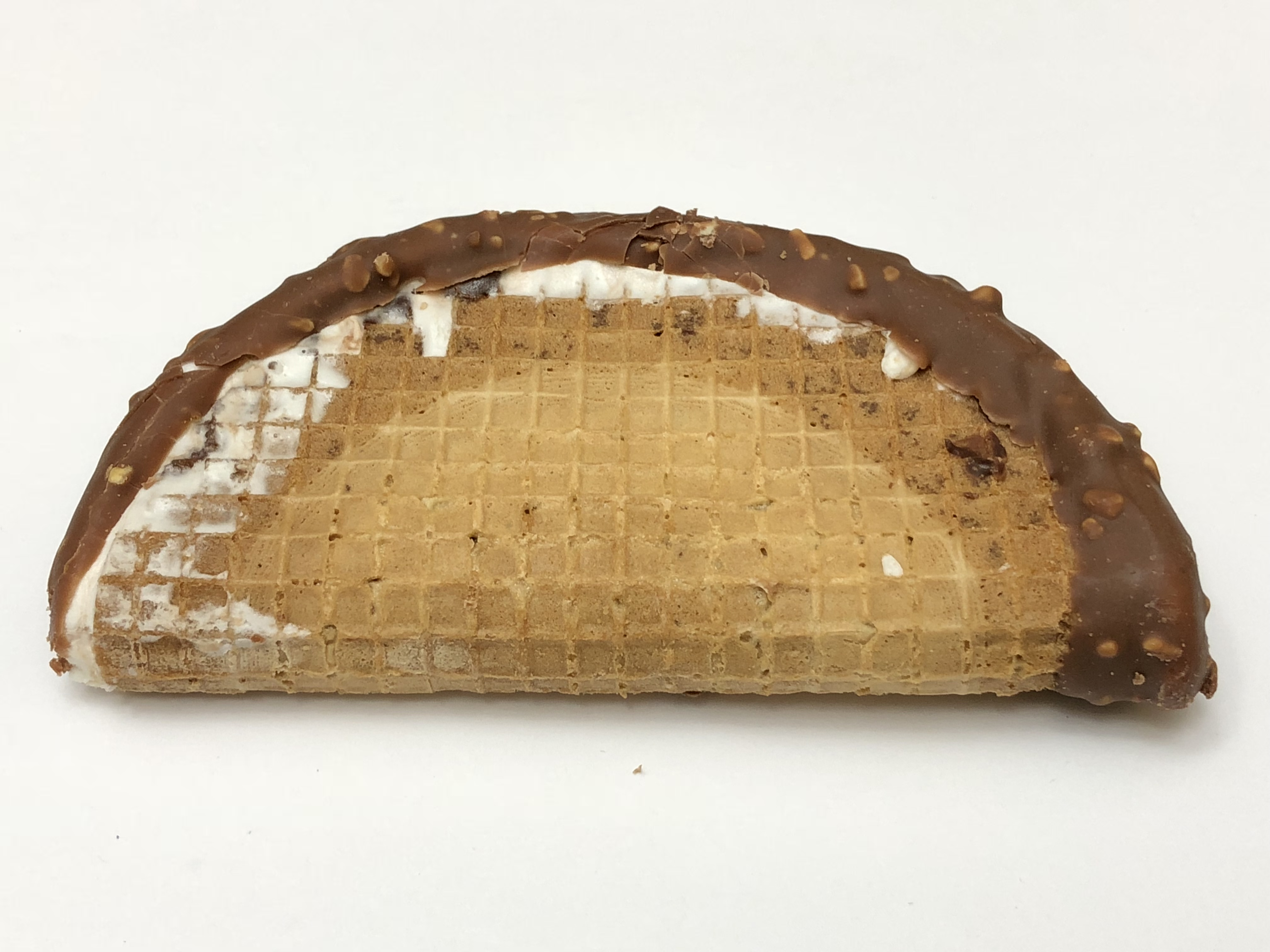
- A Choco Taco, unwrapped
- Type: Chocolate
- Course: Dessert
- Place of origin: United States
- Region or state: Pennsylvania
- Created by: Alan Drazen
- Invented: 1983; 43 years ago
- Serving temperature: Cold
- Main ingredients: Ice cream, sugar
- Food energy (per 1 Choco Taco (83 g) serving): 250 kcal (1,000 kJ)
Nutritional value
(per 1 Choco Taco (83 g) serving)
- Protein: 2g g
- Fat: 12g g
- Carbohydrate: 34g g

Choco Taco was a Good Humor-Breyers ice cream novelty resembling a taco. It consisted of a disk of waffle cone material folded to resemble a hard taco shell, reduced-fat vanilla ice cream, artificially flavored fudge, peanuts, and a milk chocolate coating. The Choco Taco was marketed under the Klondike brand as "The Original Ice Cream Taco".

The Choco Taco stopped production in 2022. A similar product called the Tacolate, filled with cinnamon ancho chili ice cream, was launched as a collaboration between Taco Bell and Salt & Straw in October 2025.

== History ==
=== 1983–1999: Introduction and improvement ===
The Choco Taco was invented in Philadelphia in 1983 by Alan Drazen, a mobile food vendor manager for the Jack and Jill Ice Cream Company. The product rolled out in the spring of 1984 and quickly became popular among mobile vending trucks with a suggested retail price of 89 cents each. In 1985, Jack & Jill teamed with Gold Bond Ice Cream Co. to handle nationwide production and distribution of the Choco Taco. By summer, it was in 30 states and sold in supermarket three-packs in two varieties—Vanilla and Fudge Grande.

In 1989, Unilever acquired Gold Bond and the Choco Taco brand, later incorporating the product into the Good Humor–Breyers Ice Cream Company in 1993.

In 1998, Unilever introduced the Choco Taco to Italy and United Kingdom under the name Winner Taco through its subsidiaries Algida and Walls. In 1999 it was introduced in Sweden through another subsidiary, GB Glace, under the same name.

In 1999, the company improved the product, incorporating a shell which stayed crisper, and introduced new packaging. The same year, the company introduced a Klondike Cookies & Cream Choco Taco, containing cookies and cream ice cream and covered with cookie pieces. Choco Tacos were also sold at some Taco Bell restaurants.

=== 2022: Discontinuation and aftermath ===
Klondike discontinued the Choco Taco in July 2022. According to an Associated Press fact check, Klondike discontinued the product due to a sharp increase in demand across its brands and to ensure the availability of the remainder of its products. However, Klondike tweeted that "we are discussing next steps, including what to do with the last 912 (we counted) tacos at HQ. Stay tuned…" on July 28, 2022, but have never followed up on this claim. On July 25, 2022 Reddit co-founder Alexis Ohanian tweeted at Unilever, offering to buy the rights to the product. When asked about this by Fortune, Ohanian confirmed that the offer was "very serious" but did not yet have any news to share.
