= Barbara Fairchild (journalist) =

American journalist (born 1951)

- Born: Barbara Lieb; February 26, 1951 (age 75); New York, New York, US
- Education: California State University, Northridge
- Occupations: Writer and editor
- Known for: Editor of Bon Appetit, 2000–2011
- Parent(s): Robert P. Lieb; Ina Lieb

Barbara Fairchild is a food journalist who was the editor-in-chief of Bon Appétit from 2000 until 2011.

== Early life ==
Fairchild was born in 1951 in Queens, New York, to Robert P. Lieb and Ina Lieb. Her father was Jewish and her mother was Lutheran. She moved to Los Angeles at a young age and grew up in Studio City. She discovered her passion for food and cooking at a young age, and after graduating from California State University, Northridge in 1972 with a degree in journalism, she went to work first for radio station KGIL-AM as a news writer, then for Carte Blanche Magazine, and then later Bon Appetit in 1978 as an editorial assistant.

== Career ==
Fairchild spent 32 years with Bon Appétit, culminating with her appointment as editor-in-chief in 2000. Since 2011 she has worked as a columnist, freelance food and travel writer, editor, public speaker, radio personality, and consultant.

== Personal life ==
Fairchild's life partner is Paul Nagle.

== Awards ==
Fairchild has been the recipient of numerous awards, including:

- Who's Who of Food and Beverage in America Inductee
- James Beard Foundation Award
- Society of Publication Designers Award

== Publications ==
- The Bon Appétit Cookbook (2006)
- The Bon Appétit Fast Easy Fresh Cookbook (2008)
- The Bon Appétit Desserts Cookbook (2010)
