= Hungry Mother =

Defunct restaurant in Cambridge, Massachusetts, U.S.

- Interactive map of Hungry Mother

Restaurant information
- Location: 233 Cardinal Medeiros Ave., Cambridge, Massachusetts, 02141, United States
- Coordinates: 42°22′04″N 71°05′28″W

Hungry Mother was a restaurant in Cambridge, Massachusetts, United States. Rachel Miller Munzer won in the Best Host category of Boston magazine's Best of Boston poll in 2009. Hungry Mother closed in 2015.

== See also ==
- List of defunct restaurants of the United States
