= Priya Krishna (journalist) =

American chef and food writer

- Education: Dartmouth College
- Occupations: Journalist, YouTube personality
- Known for: Indian-ish (2019)
- Website: priyakrishna.me

Priya Krishna is an American food journalist and YouTube personality. She is a food reporter for The New York Times and has previously contributed to The New Yorker, Eater, and TASTE (as a columnist). She is also the author of multiple cookbooks, including Indian-ish, a cookbook she wrote with her mother.

Krishna previously worked for Bon Appétit and appeared on their popular YouTube channel from 2018 to 2020. Before that, she also worked in the marketing department of Lucky Peach, a food magazine established by David Chang. In 2021, she co-authored a cookbook together with Chang titled Cooking at Home: Or, How I Learned to Stop Worrying About Recipes (And Love My Microwave).

Currently, Krishna is a food staff reporter with The New York Times and appears on its YouTube channel for cooking content.

== Early life and education ==
Krishna was raised in Dallas, Texas. Her parents emigrated from India to the United States in the 1980s.

Krishna attended Dartmouth College where she was a double major in government and French and graduated in the class of 2013. She started a career in food while attending Dartmouth, where she also worked as a marketing consultant for Dartmouth Dining Services and wrote a column for The Dartmouth called "The DDS Detective." This eventually inspired her first cookbook, published only one year after graduating in June 2014, titled Ultimate Dining Hall Hacks. She has said that writing this column was what made her realize that her enthusiasm for food might also be a career path she would enjoy,

"I loved the idea of being able to describe food, and kind of live and breathe it through my words. I also started, in my classes, doing a lot of academic deep dives in food — I took a bunch of classes that allowed me to write about food. I realized I was interested not only in describing food but exploring the cultural and historical underpinnings of food."

== Career ==
Krishna is a food journalist who has written for many major publications. She was hired at Lucky Peach directly out of college and worked there for three years before leaving to write freelance. Two of her essays on food written for The New York Times have been included in both the 2019 and 2021 editions of The Best American Food Writing. First for her essay The Life of a Restaurant Inspector: Rising Grades, Fainting Owners, then for How to Feed Crowds in a Protest or Pandemic? The Sikhs Know.

=== Bon Appétit ===
Krishna appeared on the Bon Appétit YouTube channel starting in late 2018. On August 6, 2020, Krishna announced that she would no longer appear on the channel, along with several other cast members, citing racial pay inequity as the reason for leaving.

=== Indian-ish ===
Indian-ish is a cookbook, helping readers understand basics of South Asian cooking, from how to match spices to oils and ghee to homemade yogurt and chhonk. Krishna co-authored the book along with her mom, Ritu, and it also includes many American twists on classic Indian foods, such as roti pizza and dal burritos. These are some of the dishes that Ritu developed after immigrating to Texas for children who were growing up both Indian and American.

=== The New York Times ===
Beginning in April 2021, Krishna began writing for The New York Times as a food staff reporter. Since July 2024, Krishna has been serving as an interim restaurant critic for The New York Times with Melissa Clark following the retirement of Pete Wells. She also makes regular appearances on their YouTube channel for cooking content.

== Works ==
- Cooking at Home: Or, How I Learned to Stop Worrying About Recipes (And Love My Microwave) (2021)
- Indian-Ish: Recipes and Antics from a Modern American Family (2019)
- Ultimate Dining Hall Hacks: Create Extraordinary Dishes from the Ordinary Ingredients in Your College Meal Plan (2014)

== See also ==
- Indians in the New York City metropolitan area
- New Yorkers in journalism
