= Claire Saffitz =

American pastry chef and video host (born 1986)

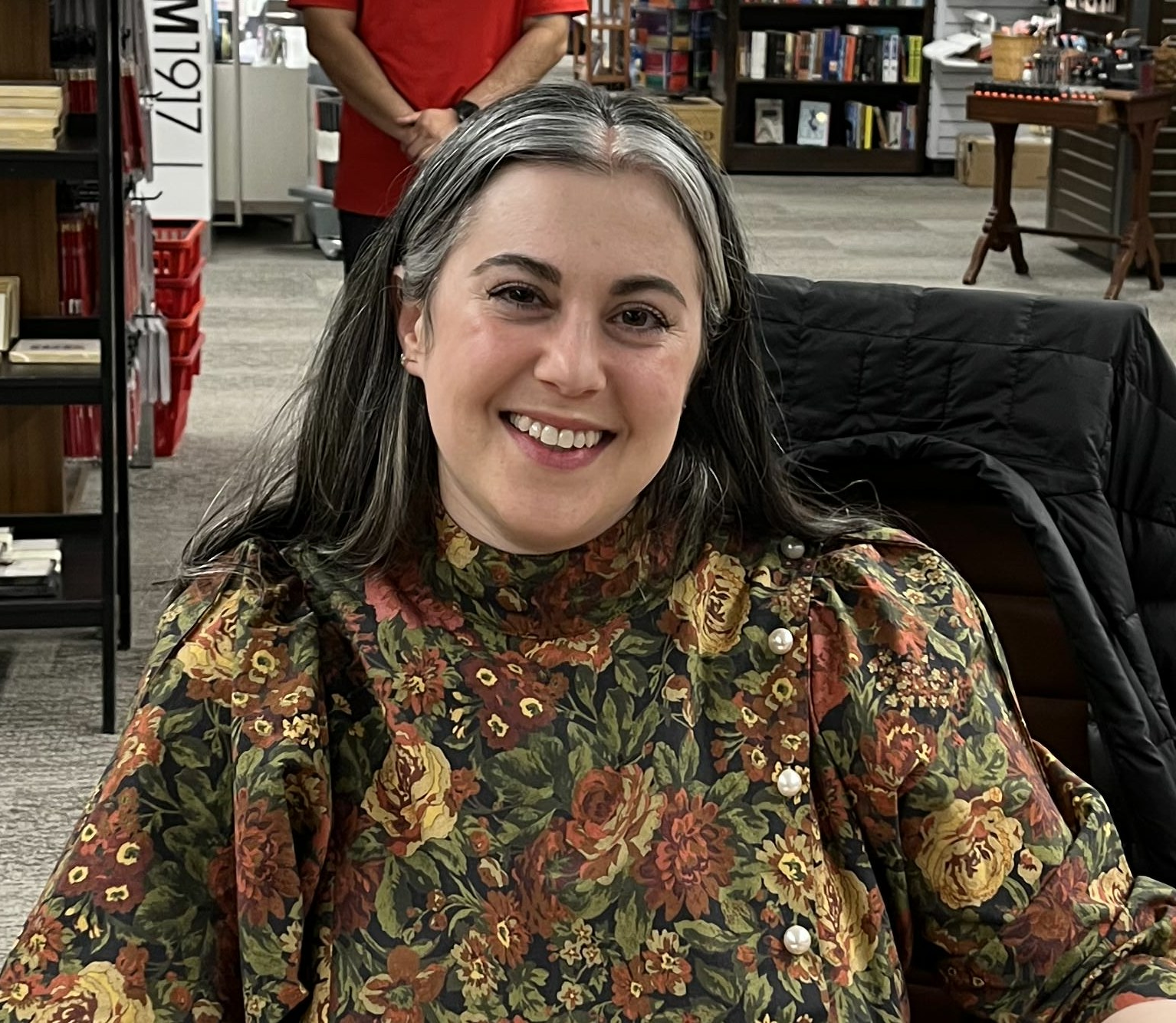
- Saffitz in 2023
- Born: September 16, 1986 (age 40); St. Louis, Missouri, US
- Education: Harvard University (AB); École Grégoire-Ferrandi; McGill University (MA)
- Spouse: Harris Mayer-Selinger (m. 2020)

YouTube information
- Channel: Claire Saffitz x Dessert Person
- Years active: 2020-present
- Genre: Cooking
- Subscribers: 1.46 million
- Views: 127.9 million
- Last updated: January 30, 2026
- Website: dessertperson.com

Claire Saffitz (born September 16, 1986) is an American food writer, chef, and YouTube personality. Until mid-2020, she was a contributing editor at Bon Appétit magazine and starred in several series on the Bon Appétit YouTube channel, including Gourmet Makes, in which she created gourmet versions of popular snack foods by reverse engineering them. Since leaving the company, she has published two cookbooks, Dessert Person and What's for Dessert, which both became New York Times Best Sellers. She has continued work as a video host on her own YouTube channel and as a freelance recipe developer, including for New York Times Cooking.

== Early life, family and education ==
Claire J. Saffitz was born in St. Louis, Missouri, to an Ashkenazi Jewish family. In the early 1900s, her great-grandfather immigrated to the US from what was then Russia but is now Ukraine; before emigrating, he worked as a baker.

She attended Captain Elementary School, then Wydown Middle School, and finally graduated from Clayton High School in 2005. She graduated from Harvard University in 2009 with an BA in US history and literature. A couple years later, she attended culinary school and studied French cuisine and pastry at École Grégoire-Ferrandi in Paris, France. After a four-month externship at Spring Restaurant, Saffitz relocated to Montreal, Québec, where she received a master's degree in history at McGill University in 2013, with a focus on French culinary history in the early modern era.

== Career ==
=== At Bon Appétit (2013–2020) ===
Saffitz joined Bon Appétit in 2013, starting as a recipe tester and working her way up to being a senior food editor, where she remained until August 2018, when she left her full-time position at the magazine. She returned in November 2018 as a freelance recipe developer and video host.

In July 2017, Gourmet Makes debuted, in which Saffitz attempted to recreate or elevate popular snack foods such as Doritos, Twinkies, and Gushers. Gourmet Makes consistently trended on YouTube and developed a cult following on social media. Saffitz's work has been described as taking "junk food staples and...elevating them from their humble processed beginnings into wonders of gastronomy."

In February 2019, Bon Appétit launched two new series that featured Saffitz: Bon Appétit’s Baking School and Making Perfect.

On January 22, 2020, Saffitz appeared on a cooking segment on The Tonight Show Starring Jimmy Fallon.

=== Departure and continued career (2020–present) ===
On June 8, 2020, Adam Rapoport resigned as editor-in-chief of Bon Appétit after a photo of him in brownface resurfaced online and sparked widespread criticism. The company as a whole also received criticism after food editor Sohla El-Waylly accused the magazine and Condé Nast Entertainment, which produces the videos on the Bon Appétit YouTube channel, of discriminating against employees of color, claiming they were subject to lesser pay than their non-minority counterparts. Amidst these circumstances, Saffitz announced she had not been under contract with the company since May 2020 and that she would be reevaluating her relationship with Bon Appétit. In October 2020, she formally announced she would not be renewing her contract.

Saffitz's debut cookbook, Dessert Person: Recipes and Guidance for Baking with Confidence, was published by Clarkson Potter, an imprint of Penguin Random House, on October 20, 2020. The book became a New York Times Best Seller, debuting at No. 2 on the "Advice, How-To & Miscellaneous" list for the week of November 8, 2020. In June 2021, the Dessert Person cookbook was nominated by the International Association of Culinary Professionals as a finalist in the annual IACP Cookbook Awards in the "Baking Sweet & Savory, Confections & Desserts" category and a nominee for the IACP Julia Child First Book Award, winning the latter in October 2021.

In December 2020, Saffitz launched her own YouTube channel, beginning with a focus on demonstrating recipes from her book, Dessert Person. The channel is produced by Vincent Cross, formerly of Bon Appétit, who also worked on the Binging with Babish YouTube channel.

In January 2021, Saffitz started contributing to NYT Cooking, including being featured on their YouTube channel. In May 2021, Saffitz made another appearance on The Tonight Show.

Claire's second cookbook What's for Dessert: Simple Recipes for Dessert People was released on November 8, 2022. It also became a New York Times Best Seller.

In April 2024, Claire launched Claire Recreates, a new series on her YouTube channel which serves as a conceptual successor to Gourmet Makes.

== Personal life ==
Saffitz is recognizable for a distinctive white streak in her dark hair, which began during college. In 2017, she ran the New York Marathon.

As of March 2020, Saffitz and her husband, chef Harris Mayer-Selinger, were residing on the Upper West Side of Manhattan in New York City. Mayer-Selinger is an Cornell Hotel School alumnus. The couple also own a home in upstate New York, which they purchased in late 2020. In December 2024, she announced that she was pregnant with their first child together.
