= Brad Leone =

American chef and YouTube personality

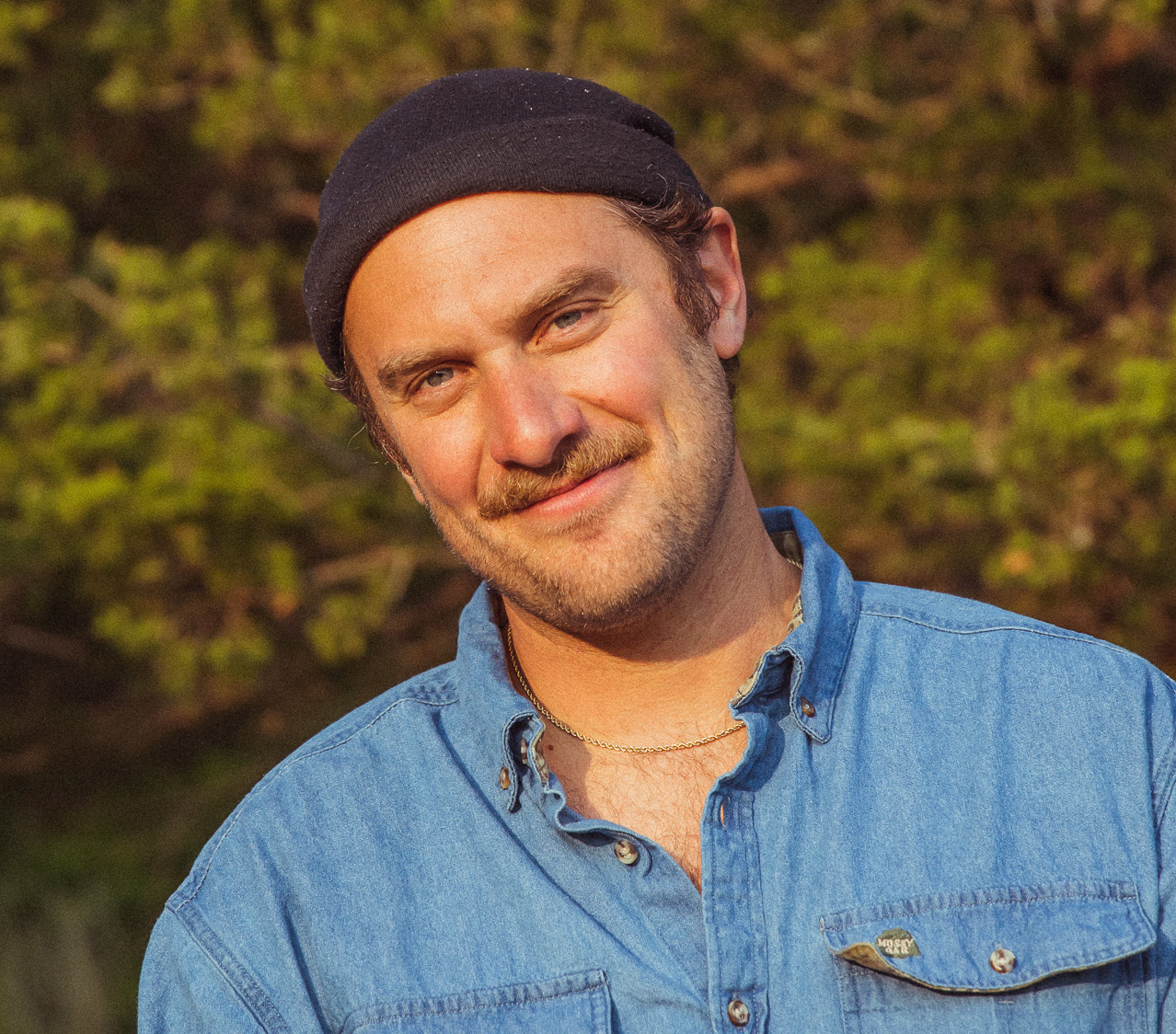
- Leone in 2023
- Born: May 16, 1985 (age 41); Sussex County, New Jersey, U.S.
- Education: Institute of Culinary Education
- Culinary career
- Cooking style: Fermentation
- Television show(s): It's Alive with Brad It's Alive: Goin' Places Making Perfect It's Alive: @ Home Tastebuds

Brad Samuel Leone (born May 16, 1985) is an American chef and YouTube personality. He is known for his appearances in videos produced by Bon Appétit for its YouTube channel, most notably as the host of It's Alive with Brad and its spinoff series It's Alive: Goin' Places.

== Early life and education ==
Leone was born on May 16, 1985 in northern New Jersey, near Mountain Creek. He has described his professional background as being "kind of all over the place", having worked a variety of jobs both in and outside the food service industry, including as a caterer, delicatessen worker, kitchen chef for multiple restaurants, glazier, and carpenter. At 26, Leone moved to Brooklyn, New York, where he studied at the Institute of Culinary Education. Leone developed an interest in fermentation after being given a SCOBY.

== Career ==
After graduating, Leone was hired as an intern at Bon Appétit as a test kitchen assistant, a role which required him to perform "all the shopping, all the cleaning and certainly all the dishes", leading him to describe his position as "a glorified dishwashing job". He was later offered a full-time position at the magazine, eventually working his way up to Test Kitchen Manager.

In 2016, amid an effort by Bon Appétit to increase its YouTube presence, creative director Alex Grossman and Video Producer Vincent Cross conceived of a web series that would follow Leone in the magazine's test kitchen. The first video, which followed Leone making kombucha, was shot and subsequently shelved for eight months before camera operator/director Vincent Cross convinced the magazine to post the video. The video, which would become the first episode of It's Alive with Brad, debuted on October 21, 2016 and now has over 4 million views.

It's Alive with Brad developed into a regular series that follows Leone as he creates food with microbial food cultures, though later episodes additionally focus on more general recipes and on-location activities. The series stars Leone and was filmed and produced by Vincent Cross and edited by Matt Hunziker. Cross previously filmed and produced the show until he left for Binging with Babish in February 2019. It's Alive has been praised for its comedic editing and for Leone's laid-back cooking style, having been described as "part cooking show, part travel show, part Pop-Up Video and part continuous blooper reel". The loose and personality-driven style of It's Alive, along with Gourmet Makes starring Claire Saffitz, are noted as contrasting the "curated [and] posh" brand of Bon Appétit and were described by Forbes as having "changed the way Condé Nast approaches online video".

In late 2018, Leone transitioned roles at Bon Appétit, moving out of his role as Test Kitchen Manager to focus exclusively on creating videos. An It's Alive spin-off series, It's Alive: Goin' Places, was launched in 2019 on Bon Appétit's dedicated streaming channel; the first season follows Leone in Central Texas, while the second season follows Leone in Hawaii. That same year, Leone was nominated at the 11th Shorty Awards in the category "Best in Food" for his work on It's Alive. Brad also appears in other Bon Appétit series, like Making Perfect and Test Kitchen Talks.

In December of 2022, Leone and Bon Appétit announced they have mutually decided to pivot from existing full-time employee contract. He announced: "I'm not sleeping on you guys. Just wait for 2023. Lots of videos coming soon to my own YouTube page. Real good clean friggin' fun coming soon."

On June 5, 2023, Leone launched two new shows on his eponymous YouTube channel; "Local Legends" and "Makin’ It".

== Personal life ==
Leone, his partner Peggy, and their two sons resided in New Jersey until early 2021 when they moved to Connecticut.
