= Sohla El-Waylly =

American chef and YouTube personality

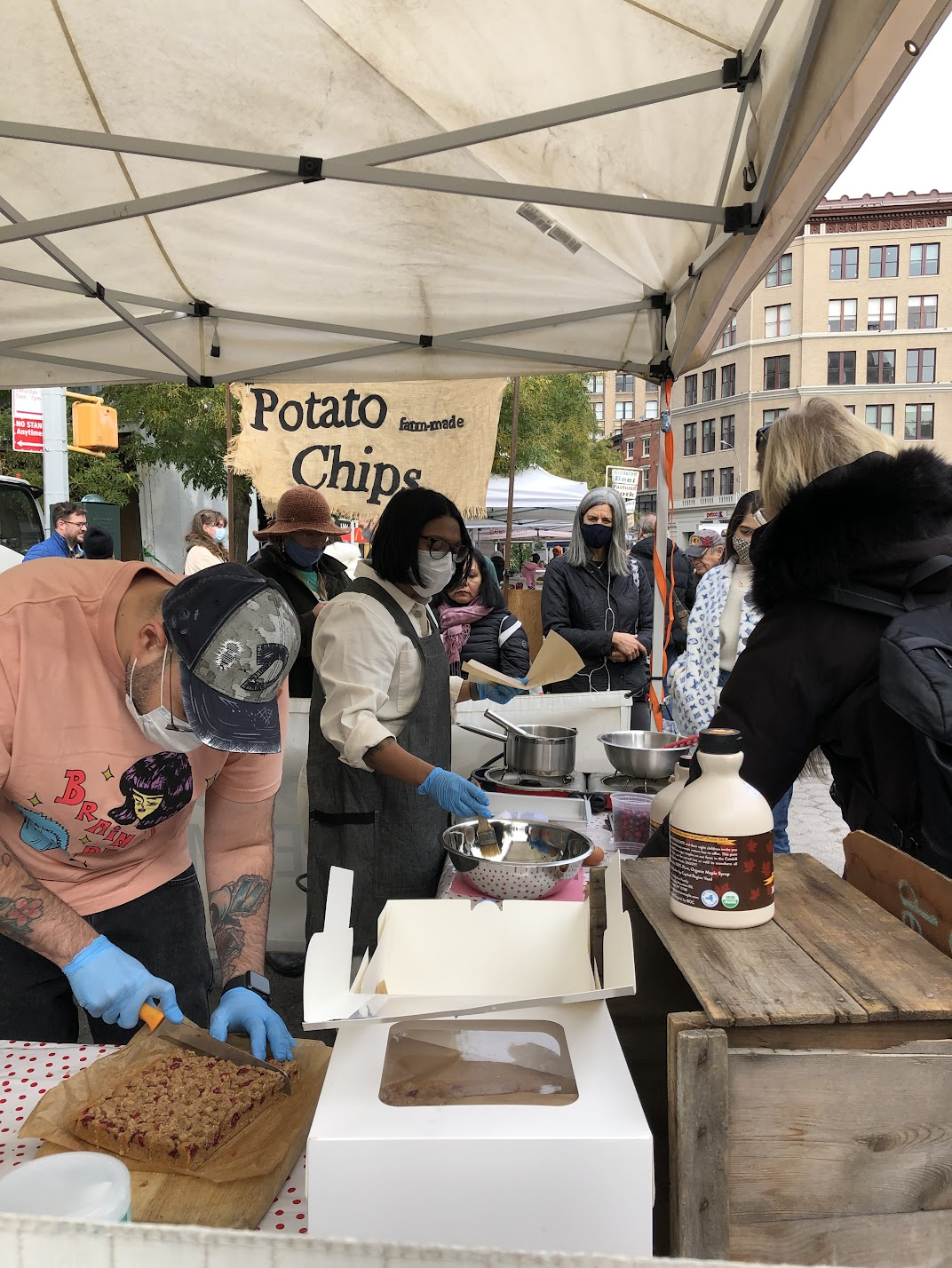
- El-Waylly in November 2021
- Born: Nusrath Sohla Muzib; 1985 or 1986 (age 40–41); Los Angeles, California U.S.
- Education: The Culinary Institute of America
- Occupations: American chef, YouTube personality
- Spouse: Hisham "Ham" El-Waylly
- Culinary career
- Previous restaurant(s): Hail Mary, Brooklyn
- Television shows: Stump Sohla (Babish Culinary Universe, 2020–2021); Off-Script with Sohla (Food52, 2021–2022); Ancient Recipes With Sohla (History, 2021–2023); Mystery Menu (NYTimes, 2021–2024); The Big Brunch (HBO, 2022)
- Award won: James Beard Award (2024)
- Website: www.hellosohla.com

Sohla El-Waylly (née Nusrath Sohla Muzib) is an American chef, restaurateur, author, and YouTube personality. She has previously created recipes and hosted web video series for History and the New York Times Cooking YouTube channel, and now releases cooking video content on a YouTube channel she shares with her husband Ham named Sohla and Ham. She also served as a judge on the culinary reality competition The Big Brunch.

Her first cookbook, Start Here: Instructions for Becoming a Better Cook, was released in October 2023. The same title is the 2024 James Beard Award General Winner: Book.

Previously, she was an assistant food editor at Bon Appétit, where she appeared in videos produced for the magazine's YouTube channel. Later, she produced videos with Food52 and Andrew Rea on the Babish Culinary Universe YouTube channel.

== Early life and education ==
Sohla Muzib (Bengali: সোহলা মুজিব) was raised in Los Angeles in a Bangladeshi-American family who owned a Baskin-Robbins store. She continued in the restaurant industry by working for Outback Steakhouse.

She went to University of California, Irvine, where she studied economics and worked at a Cheesecake Factory on the side.

Beginning in 2008, El-Waylly attended The Culinary Institute of America (CIA). She says that while at CIA, she was sexually harassed by a dean, and when she spoke up a female dean told her, "That's what happens in the real world. You better get used to it."

== Career ==
After graduating, El-Waylly worked at restaurants in New York City such as Atera, which has two Michelin stars, and Del Posto, owned by Joe Bastianich.

In March 2016, El-Waylly and her husband opened a diner called Hail Mary in Brooklyn, which attracted favorable reviews. However, an early review from Scott Lynch for Quick Bites also stated, "I worry about Hail Mary because it's an ambitious, almost special-occasion restaurant wrapped inside a burger-and-shake joint." The restaurant closed after 11 months, which El-Waylly attributed in part to opening Hail Mary without other investors, and in part to the expectations of white customers. In a 2017 interview with GQ, El-Waylly explained that she perceived customers as often entering Hail Mary expecting "foreign or exotic ingredients" because of the owners' cultural backgrounds; she stated "There would have been more leeway allowed in the food shrouded by illusion of 'authenticity'...There are white chefs that can pull from different cultures without explanation, but us making white food always needs a thesis behind it."

El-Waylly worked at Serious Eats as a culinary editor through most of 2018 and joined Bon Appétit magazine in August 2019. At Bon Appétit, she worked as an assistant food editor and appeared regularly on the magazine's popular YouTube channel. In June 2020, a photo of Bon Appétit editor-in-chief Adam Rapoport in brownface resurfaced online and sparked widespread criticism. During an emergency company-wide Zoom meeting, El-Waylly called for Rapoport to step down. She then publicly accused the magazine of discriminating towards employees of color, claiming they were subject to lesser pay than their non-minority counterparts and called for BIPOC chefs to receive fair titles, salaries, and compensation for video appearances. Rapoport resigned the same day. In August 2020, El-Waylly announced on her Instagram that she would no longer appear in videos on the magazine's YouTube channel due to continued lack of progress by Condé Nast Entertainment in resolving the issues that had arisen, though she would continue to contribute recipes and articles to the magazine and website. Soon after, she announced she had completely severed ties with Bon Appétit.

Her series titled Stump Sohla premiered on September 24, 2020, which was hosted on Andrew Rea's Babish Culinary Universe YouTube channel. El-Waylly said she decided to work with Rea because she would have more creative control and direct cut of the video revenue. "I just really don't want to be a prop," she said in an interview with New York magazine. Rea and El-Waylly ended their collaboration in early 2021. El-Waylly also began a weekly column with Food52 called "Off-Script with Sohla" and started writing a cookbook.

El-Waylly has also hosted a web series for the American TV network History titled Ancient Recipes with Sohla, as well as multiple shows for the New York Times Cooking YouTube channel, including Cooking 101 with Sohla and Mystery Menu, which often featured both Sohla and Ham. In 2025, El-Waylly publicly announced that she was no longer working with The New York Times. El-Waylly now releases cooking video content on a channel she shares with Ham, launched November 2025, named Sohla and Ham, with series like Stand and Stir.

In 2021, El-Waylly was one of Time 100's Next list.

On October 31, 2023, El-Waylly released her first cookbook titled, Start Here: Instructions for Becoming a Better Cook. In 2024, the book won a James Beard Award, as well as an IACP Award for Book Design.

El-Waylly is a judge on the HBO Max culinary reality competition The Big Brunch, along with Dan Levy and Will Guidara.

== Personal life ==
El-Waylly lives in New York City with her husband, fellow chef Hisham "Ham" El-Waylly. They met while they were both attending the Culinary Institute of America. In September 2023, they announced the birth of their first child.
