= Adam Rapoport =

American magazine editor

- Born: 1969 (age 56–57); Washington, D.C.
- Education: University of California, Berkeley
- Occupations: Magazine editor, food journalist
- Known for: Editor-in-Chief, Bon Appetit (2010–2020)
- Spouse: Simone Shubuck

Adam Rapoport (born 1969) is an American former magazine editor. After serving as a style editor at GQ, Rapoport was the editor-in-chief of Bon Appétit magazine from 2010 until his resignation in 2020.

== Early life and education ==
Rapoport was born in Washington, D.C., to Maxine and Dan Rapoport. His mother was born a Polish Catholic and later converted to Judaism. His father was a journalist, author, and publisher who founded a small publishing company. Rapoport was raised Jewish. He attended Woodrow Wilson High School, graduating in 1987, and then attended the University of California, Berkeley, graduating in 1992.

== Career ==
In 1994, Rapoport joined the James Beard Foundation as an assistant in the foundation's publication office. In 1997, he joined the New York division of Time Out magazine as a restaurant editor. In 2000, Rapoport became the Style Editor of GQ magazine.

Rapoport succeeded Barbara Fairchild as the editor-in-chief of Bon Appétit magazine in 2010.

In 2017, Rapoport hosted the first season of Food Network's Best Baker in America.

In June 2020, Rapoport drew criticism after a photo resurfaced of him in brownface on Halloween 2004. Originally posted by his wife on Instagram in 2013, the photo was also framed on his desk. He was wearing a t-shirt, a do-rag, silver chains, and a baseball cap. His leadership was simultaneously brought into question after food editor Sohla El-Waylly accused the magazine of discriminating against employees of color. That day, Rapoport announced he would step down.
