= Brownface =

Racial impersonation

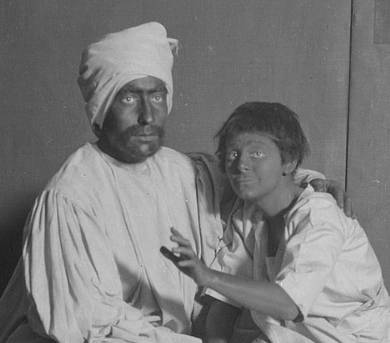
Two actors in brownface in a production of The Post Office in 1915

Brownface is a social phenomenon in which a white or light-skinned person attempts to portray themselves as a "brown" person of color, with a color imitating a light to dark brown complexion. It is typically defined as a racist phenomenon, similar to blackface.

== Brown voice ==
"Brown voice" is the use of stereotypical, often exaggerated, accents when portraying a character with a Latin American, Middle Eastern, Polynesian, Native American, or Indian background. It is most commonly found in cartoons, but it can also be used in live-action television and film. The Simpsons came under criticism in 2018 after Hari Kondabolu released The Problem with Apu, a documentary that examined the show's character Apu, voiced by Hank Azaria, who is of Sephardic Jewish descent. He addressed how several aspects of the character were racial stereotypes that are demeaning to the character as well as Indian immigrants in general. The character's thick Indian accent, voiced by a white male, and the fact that he works at a convenience store were the two main issues addressed by Kondabolu.

Speedy Gonzalez is a Mexican mouse found in Looney Tunes and other cartoons related to the Looney Tunes brand. His first appearance was in 1953. Since then, there has been debate over the racial depiction of Speedy as he is dressed in a poncho, wears a sombrero, and speaks with a thick accent. He was originally voiced by a white actor. In recent years, he has been voiced by Hispanic actors and has been embraced by the Hispanic community as he is quite the opposite of most depictions of Mexicans: lazy and slow. He is embraced for breaking the racial stereotype, despite what the initial goal of the character's creation may have been.

== Historical and economic explanations ==
There are historical and economic factors that have contributed to the success and arrival of brownface and minstrel shows in the United States. Although it is impossible to say for sure why the phenomenon of brownface occurred, United States' immigration and foreign affairs have had an impact. Ever since the Chinese Exclusion Act of 1882 efforts to limit immigration and keep a sort of native purity within the United States has been common.

These sentiments to preserve native purity usually occur out of economic competition, seen most clearly in global wars. For example, after the First World War in 1919, the United States passed a series of immigration laws that helped to restrict immigration in order to keep the nation more isolated. Actions such as these result in an increase of social racism when immigration clashes with nativist sentiments. Today, federal efforts to decrease immigration from Mexico have helped inadvertently to reinforce stereotypes about Mexicans as being lazy, criminal, and unwelcome. This is only one possible explanation as to why brownface and other racist phenomena have occurred throughout history and continue today. This and similar theories are debated and discussed to explain social events like brownface.

The Bracero Program of 1942 serves as another possible explanation for the emergence of brownface. This program was an agreement between Mexico and the United States and allowed for Mexican agricultural workers to come to the United States for seasonal work. This enabled the United States' wartime labor needs to be met. It also gave Mexican workers struggling to find work job opportunities. However, the political sentiments of the war popularized nativism, as global wars often do.

Popular opinion in the United States was generally that of preserving the sacred purity and success of democracy. Increased interaction between other nations was seen as jeopardizing to these ideals. The Bracero program let more Mexican laborers into the country, propelled the war effort, and fueled both the United States' and Mexico's economies. This social sentiment of nativism increased racism against these laborers. These laborers often overstayed their work visas as economic opportunities were better in the United States.

As brownface saw its reemergence in the next decade with Bill Dana's minstrel character, Jose Jimenez, and the Bracero program, unintentionally worsened racism against Latin American people and other people of brown color. There are social, economic, political, and cultural factors that allow for all social phenomenon like brownface to occur.

=== Minstrel shows ===
Minstrel shows have been seen within the United States since the formal institution of slavery in the early 1800s. They relied heavily on mocking the minority or the foreign, including race, class, and social standing. Their target audience was the white middle class, anyone who was seen as 'normal' or 'accepted,' and served mainly to reassure them about their own social standings and importance. Brownface, although always an element in these shows, became a much bigger part during the late 1800s and early 1900s, with a reappearance during the Civil Rights Movement during the 1960s. As economic and social factors during this time encouraged nativism and a shunning of the foreign, the increased immigration from Latin America and India led to the success of these types of shows. Immigrants and foreigners became increasingly unpopular and unwelcome, and entertainment and social norms based on degrading them became stronger. Brownface was used in these shows to reinforce stereotypes, portraying brown people as lazy, stubborn, and unable to assimilate into American life.

==== José Jiménez ====
José Jiménez was the character used by Bill Dana, an American comedian during the 1960s, to mock and humiliate Latino culture. His appearance, and the increased prominence of brownface, can be credited to the Civil Rights Movement in the United States during this time. As blackface and racism against African Americans became increasingly unpopular, it can be explained that brownface and racism against other foreigners was the next go-to. José Jiménez was portrayed as a Hispanic man incapable of meeting 'American' traditions and values, struggling to learn English, and appearing lazy and untrustworthy. He was based heavily on racial stereotypes which also propelled his success during this decade.

== Notable examples ==
Year	Film	Actor(s)
1952	Viva Zapata!	Marlon Brando playing Mexican revolutionary Emiliano Zapata
1958	Touch of Evil	Charlton Heston playing Mexican narcotics policeman Ramon Miguel "Mike" Vargas
1960	The Millionairess	Peter Sellers playing Doctor Kabir
1961	West Side Story	Natalie Wood playing Maria, George Chakiris playing Bernardo
1962	Lawrence of Arabia	Alec Guinness playing Hashemite leader of the Arab Revolt, Prince Faisal (later Faisal I; spelled "Feisal" in the film's credits).
1963	From Russia with Love	Aliza Gur and Martine Beswick as Gypsy girls Vida and Zora
1968	The Party	Peter Sellers playing Hruindi V. Bakshi
1981	Who Finds a Friend Finds a Treasure	Sal Borgese playing Anulu
1984	Indiana Jones and the Temple of Doom	British Parsi character actor Nizwar Karanj was "browned up" for his role as a sacrificial victim.
1986	Short Circuit	Fisher Stevens as Ben Jabituya (Note: Character's last name was changed from Jabituya to Jahrvi for sequel.)
1986	Aliens	Jenette Goldstein plays Vasquez
1988	Short Circuit 2	Fisher Stevens as Ben Jahrvi
1997	Austin Powers: International Man of Mystery	Will Ferrell as Mustafa
2008	The Love Guru	Mike Myers playing Pitka.
2010	Prince of Persia: The Sands of Time	Gemma Arterton playing Tamina
2013	The Lone Ranger	Johnny Depp playing Tonto
2014	Exodus: Gods and Kings	Joel Edgerton as Ramses II
2019	The Laundromat	Meryl Streep playing Elena
2019	Bala	Bhumi Pednekar, a naturally fair-skinned actor, applied dark makeup to play a dark-skinned character in this Bollywood movie.
2019	Gully Boy	Ranveer Singh, a prominent Bollywood actor, used brownface to portray a slum dweller in Mumbai in this Bollywood movie.
2019	Super 30	Hrithik Roshan, a Bollywood actor with fair skin, used brownface to portray a person from the eastern Indian state of Bihar.

=== Ben Kingsley in Gandhi ===
Ben Kingsley played Mahatma Gandhi in the 1982 film Gandhi. Although he is of Indian descent on his father's side, he is naturally fairly light-skinned. In order to appear more like Gandhi, Kingsley wore darker makeup. It has been suggested that he used brownface for the film in order to look more Indian than he is.

=== Paula Deen ===
In 2015, the American cooking television host Paula Deen posted a picture of her son in brownface to her Twitter account. The picture showed her son dressed as Ricky Ricardo from the television show I Love Lucy, with the caption "Lucyyyyyyy! You got a lot of esplainin' to do!" Her son was pictured wearing a layer of dark makeup on his face and neck in an effort to make him look like the Cuban character.

=== Rob Schneider ===
Saturday Night Live alum Rob Schneider has been criticized for playing a Middle Eastern delivery man in Big Daddy, an East Asian minister in I Now Pronounce You Chuck & Larry, an East Asian waiter in Eight Crazy Nights, a Latino in The Waterboy, a native Hawaiian in 50 First Dates, a Palestinian cab driving terrorist in You Don't Mess with the Zohan, and a Saudi prince in Click.

== Current efforts to discourage brownface ==
In recent decades, there has been a push from Latin Americans to display their culture through entertainment. This has resulted in more ethnically accurate portrayals of Latinos since Latinos are the ones creating and producing the work. Television shows like Master of None, discussed below, and others are helping to shatter racist stereotypes and other contributors to brownface and brown voice. Similarly, government efforts continue to push for racial equality through affirmative action programs. While brownface is a social phenomenon and therefore hard to combat, through efforts like these and an overall distaste for racism, these stereotypes may one day disappear.

=== Master of None ===
Aziz Ansari, an Indian American actor and director, along with Alan Yang, wrote and produced a television show called Master of None. The show follows the life of Dev, a thirty-year-old American, played by Ansari, who strives to be an actor in New York City. The show features the struggles of being an Indian American in a predominately white society, even in a city as diverse as New York City. Ansari elaborated in an interview that many of the incidents and situations that Dev faces were inspired by his own life in the United States. Master of None is worth mentioning because it is one of the first television series where Indian Americans are portrayed in a positive way, and where most of the cast is Indian. Indian Americans have typically been portrayed in media for comedic purposes, such as the character Apu in The Simpsons. The episode of Master of None, "Indians on TV", specifically focused on white actors using make up to play dark-skinned characters.

== See also ==
- Blackface – Theatrical makeup caricaturing Black people
- Jewface – Stereotypical portrayals of Jewish people
- Redface – Use of costumes to caricature Indigenous Americans
- Yellowface – Theatrical makeup caricaturing Asian people
