= List of NewsGuild-CWA Locals =

List of NewsGuild union Locals

The NewsGuild-CWA
- The NewsGuild-CWA
- Founded: 1933
- Headquarters: Washington, D.C.
- Location: United States, Canada
- Members: 26,000
- Key people: Jon Schleuss, president
- Parent organization: Communications Workers of America
- Affiliations: IFJ, AFL–CIO
- Website: www.newsguild.org

The NewsGuild-CWA is composed of 46 US trade union locals and 17 Canadian locals, based largely on geography. Some locals represent the staff of a single publication, organization or company, while others represent the employees of multiple workplaces, with each considered a "unit" within the local.

== United States ==
Albany Newspaper Guild – 31034

- Founded in 1936 as the Newspaper Guild of Albany, NY, with its first bargaining agreement with the Albany Times Union newspaper.

Bakersfield – 39202

- Represents news staff of The Bakersfield Californian.

Boston – 31245

- The Boston Newspaper Guild was founded in 1940.
- More than 300 employees of Boston Globe Media Partners, including the Boston Globe and Stat are represented by Boston News Guild, but as of July 2021 Boston Globe does not have a collective bargaining agreement with them (or the two other unions involved).

Buffalo – 31026

- Founded in 1934 as the Buffalo Newspaper Guild, representing employees of Buffalo News.

California Federation of Interpreters – 39000

- In the 1990's California Federation of Interpreters, affiliated with Locale 39521 (Pacific Media Workers). In 2015 it separated into its current Local 39000.
- In 2019, CFI president Michael Ferreira supported AB5 legislation, which would classify more interpreters as employees, not independent contractors.

Chicago – 34071

CWA (Los Angeles) – 9003

Dayton – 34157

Denver – 37074

Detroit – 34022

Erie – 38187

Eugene – 37194

Florida – 3108

Hazleton – 38216

IAPE – 1096

- The Independent Association of Publishers' Employees represents 1,300 employees of Dow Jones & Company, including the Wall Street Journal.

Indianapolis – 34070

Kenosha – 34159

Kingston – 31180

Knoxville – 33076

Lexington – 33229

Maine – 31128

Media Guild of the West – 39213

- The Arizona Republic
- Austin American-Statesman
- The Dallas Morning News/Al Día
- The Desert Sun
- Los Angeles Times
- Fort Worth Star-Telegram
- Southern California News Group
- Phoenix New Times

Memphis – 33091

Milwaukee – 34051

Minnesota – 37002

New Hampshire – 31167

NewsGuild of New York – 31003

- New York Amsterdam News
- Ars Union – Ars Technica
- BuzzFeed News Union – Buzzfeed, Inc.
- Condé Nast union – Allure, Architectural Digest, Bon Appétit, Condé Nast Traveler, Epicurious, Glamour, GQ, Self, Teen Vogue, Them, Vanity Fair, Vogue, Condé Nast Entertainment
- Consumer Reports
- Daily Beast Union – The Daily Beast
- El Diario La Prensa
- Foreign Policy
- Fortune Union – Fortune
- The Forward
- Gannett Regional Union
  - APP-MCJ Guild – Asbury Park Press, My Central Jersey
  - Hudson Valley NewsGuild – The Journal News, Poughkeepsie Journal and Times Herald-Record
  - The Record Guild – The Bergen Record, The Daily Record, and New Jersey Herald
  - Reviewed Union
  - Newspaper Guild of Rochester – Democrat and Chronicle, and Canandaigua Daily Messenger
  - Utica Guild – Observer-Dispatch and Herkimer Times Telegram
- The Hour
- Hudson News
- Insider
- Jacobin
- Jewish Telegraphic Agency
- La Opinión
- The Markup
- Dotdash Meredith
  - Entertainment Weekly
  - Martha Stewart Living
  - Shape
- Law360
- Mashable
- The Nation
- NBC Digital NewsGuild – NBCNews.com
- The New Republic Union – The New Republic
- New York Daily News
- New York Mag Union – New York
- The New York Times Guild – New York Times (unionized since 1940s)
- The New Yorker Union – The New Yorker
- PCMag
- People Magazine Union – People
- Pitchfork
- Quartz
- The Record, Daily Record, New Jersey Herald
- Reuters
- Roosevelt Institute
- S&P Global Ratings
- Sports Illustrated Union – Sports Illustrated
- TIME Union – (Time print staff have been unionized since 1940s, with digital more recently)
- Wirecutter
- WIRED Union – Wired.
- WPIX

News Media Guild – 31222

- Associated Press union goes back to 1969 when it was called Wire Service Guild
- Democracy Works
- EFE
- Guardian US
- Oxford University Press
- Pageant Media
- United Press International

Northeast Ohio – 34001

Pacific Media Workers – 39521

- San Francisco Chronicle
- Daily Kos
- East Bay Times
- The Fresno Bee
- Hawaii Tribune-Herald
- The Maui News
- Honolulu Star-Advertiser
- The Mercury News
- The Modesto Bee
- The Monterey County Herald
- The Press Democrat
- The Sacramento Bee
- International Longshore and Warehouse Union

Pacific Northwest – 37082

Philadelphia – 38010

Pittsburgh – 38061

Providence – 31041

Puerto Rico – 33225

Rochester – 31017

Scranton – 38177

Sioux City – 37123

Southern California – 9003

- City News Service
- International Documentary Association

Southern California – 9400

- Los Angeles Daily News
- Press-Telegram

Terre Haute – 34046

Toledo – 34043

United Media Guild – 36047

Utica – 31129

Washington-Baltimore – 32035

- Democratic Socialists of America

WashTech – 37083

- Washington Alliance of Technology Workers

Wilkes-Barre – 38120

== CWA/SCA Canada ==
CWA/SCA Canada

Alberta – 30400

Canadian Media Guild- 30213

Halifax – 30130

Kingston Typographical – 30204

Moncton – 30636

Montreal – 30111

New Brunswick – 30664

North Bay – 30241

Northern Ontario – 30232

Ottawa – 30205

Peterborough – 30248

Saskatchewan – 30199

Sault Ste Marie – 30746

Sydney – 30460

Thunder Bay – 30044

Victoria-Vancouver – 30223

Windsor – 30553

== Archives ==
The Walter P. Reuther Library is the official repository of The Newspaper Guild Official Archives. Walter P. Reuther Library, Wayne State University, Detroit, Michigan.

- Newspaper Guild Records, 1933–1973. 156.5 linear feet.
- St. Louis Newspaper Guild Local 47 Records, 1933–1966. 10.5 linear feet.
- Detroit Newspaper Guild Local 22 Records. 1933–2007. 67.25 linear feet.
- Pacific Northwest Newspaper Guild Local 82 Records. 1950–1976. 6.5 linear feet.
- Columbus Newspaper Guild Local 13 Records. 1934–1986. 5.5 linear feet.
- Newspaper Guild of Albany, N.Y., Local 34 Records. 1936–1989. 5.25 cubic feet.
