= List of international cricket centuries by Kumar Sangakkara =

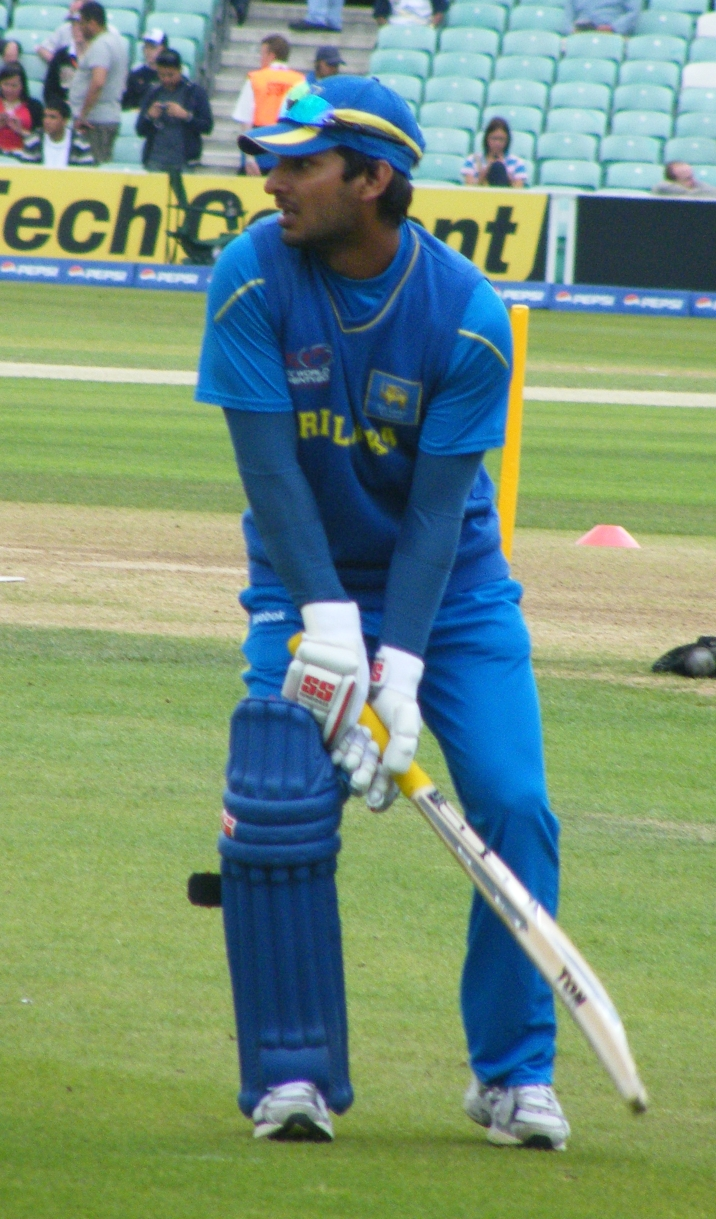
Kumar Sangakkara has scored 63 international centuries.

Kumar Sangakkara is a retired Sri Lankan cricketer and a former captain of the Sri Lanka national cricket team. He is a left-handed top-order batsman and plays as the wicket-keeper in One Day International (ODI) format of the game. Described by the English cricket writer Peter Roebuck as "among the most polished and prudent of batsmen", Sangakkara has made centuries (100 or more runs in a single innings) on 38 and 25 occasions in Test and ODI matches respectively. He has at times been top of the International Cricket Council (ICC) rankings for Test batsmen. His awards include ODI Cricketer of the Year, captain of the ICC World XI Test team, and the 2011 ICC People's Choice Award (all at the 2011 ICC Awards), and being named one of the Wisden Cricketers of the Year in 2012.

Sangakkara made his Test debut against South Africa in July 2000. He scored his maiden Test century in 2001, against India, and his first double-century during the 2002 Asian Test Championship final against Pakistan. Sangakkara's highest score in Test cricket is 319, which he scored against Bangladesh in 2014. During his innings of 287 against South Africa in 2006, he and Mahela Jayawardene set a new world record of 624 runs for the highest partnership for any wicket in Test or first-class cricket. (Note: The previous highest partnership in first-class cricket—577 runs—was by Vijay Hazare and Gul Mahomed for Baroda cricket team against Holkar in 1946.) In the following year, he scored back-to-back double-centuries against Bangladesh, the fifth instance of successive double-centuries in Test cricket. (Note: The previous players to accomplish this feat were Wally Hammond (twice), Donald Bradman and Vinod Kambli.) He has scored 200 or more runs in a Test match on eleven occasions, surpassing Brian Lara, who has scored 200 or more runs in a Test match on nine occasions; only Donald Bradman (12 double-centuries) has done so more often. He became the ninth batsman and second Sri Lankan to score centuries against all Test-playing nations in December 2007, when he scored 152 against England. (Note: Marvan Atapattu was the first Sri Lankan player to achieve this.) He was appointed captain of the Sri Lanka team in March 2009, following the resignation of Mahela Jayawardene, and the first of his seven Test centuries as captain came against Pakistan in July of the same year. Sangakkara has the second-highest batting average—69.60 per innings—for a captain who scored a minimum of 1,500 runs. (Note: When captaining Australia, Donald Bradman scored 14 centuries and averaged 101.51 per innings.)

He made his ODI debut in July 2000 against Pakistan, and his first century in this format was against the same team during the 2003 Cherry Blossom Sharjah Cup. The start of his ODI career was "fairly ordinary", according to one cricket journalist, as he only scored two centuries in four years. His highest score of 169 was made at the R. Premadasa Stadium, Colombo, against South Africa, during South African cricket team in Sri Lanka in 2013. Sangakkara's only ODI century as captain was scored against New Zealand in a group stage match in the 2011 ICC World Cup. In the sixth match of the 2011–12 Commonwealth Bank Series, Sangakkara became the third and fastest Sri Lanka batsman to reach 10,000 ODI runs. (Note: He took 296 innings to reach the 10,000 run mark; however, in 2015, Tillakaratne Dilshan broke his record when he achieved the feat in 293 innings. As of July 2024, Sangakkara remains the second-fastest Sri Lankan to score 10,000 runs.) He played 56 Twenty20 International matches (T20Is) between 2006 and 2014; his highest score in the format is 78.

== Key ==
Symbol	Meaning
*	Remained not out
†	Player of the match
‡	Captained the Sri Lanka team
Test	The number of the Test match played in that series
Pos.	Position in the batting order
Inn.	The innings of the match
S.R.	Strike rate during the innings
H/A/N	Venue was at home (Sri Lanka), away or neutral
Lost	The match was lost by Sri Lanka
Won	The match was won by Sri Lanka
Drawn	The match was drawn

== Test match centuries ==
No.	Score	Against	Pos.	Inn.	Test	Venue	H/A/N	Date	Result	Ref
1	105*	India	3	2	1/3	Galle International Stadium, Galle	Home	14 August 2001	Won	
2	140	West Indies	3	2	1/3	Galle International Stadium, Galle	Home	13 November 2001	Won	
3	128 †	Zimbabwe	3	1	1/3	Sinhalese Sports Club Ground, Colombo	Home	27 December 2001	Won	
4	230 †	Pakistan	3	2	3/3	Gaddafi Stadium, Lahore	Away	6 March 2002	Won	
5	270 †	Zimbabwe	3	2	2/3	Queens Sports Club, Bulawayo	Away	14 May 2004	Won	
6	232 †	South Africa	3	1	2/3	Sinhalese Sports Club Ground, Colombo	Home	11 August 2004	Won	
7	138	Pakistan	3	3	2/2	National Stadium, Karachi	Away	28 October 2004	Lost	
8	157* †	West Indies	3	3	2/2	Asgiriya Stadium, Kandy	Home	22 July 2005	Won	
9	185 †	Pakistan	3	3	1/2	Sinhalese Sports Club Ground, Colombo	Home	26 March 2006	Drawn	
10	287	South Africa	3	2	1/2	Sinhalese Sports Club Ground, Colombo	Home	27 July 2006	Won	
11	100*	New Zealand	3	3	1/2	Lancaster Park, Christchurch	Away	7 December 2006	Lost	
12	156*	New Zealand	3	1	2/2	Basin Reserve, Wellington	Away	15 December 2006	Won	
13	200* †	Bangladesh	3	2	2/3	Paikiasothy Saravanamuttu Stadium, Colombo	Home	3 July 2007	Won	
14	222*	Bangladesh	3	2	3/3	Asgiriya Stadium, Kandy	Home	11 July 2007	Won	
15	192	Australia	3	4	2/2	Bellerive Oval, Hobart	Away	16 November 2007	Lost	
16	152 †	England	3	3	1/3	Asgiriya Stadium, Kandy	Home	1 December 2007	Won	
17	144 †	India	4	2	3/3	Paikiasothy Saravanamuttu Stadium, Colombo	Home	8 August 2008	Won	
18	104	Pakistan	3	1	2/2	Gaddafi Stadium, Lahore	Away	1 March 2009	Drawn (Note: This match was abandoned because of an attack on the bus carrying the Sri Lanka cricket team before the start of the third day's play.)	
19	130* † ‡	Pakistan	3	4	3/3	Sinhalese Sports Club Ground, Colombo	Home	20 July 2009	Drawn	
20	109 ‡	New Zealand	3	3	2/2	Sinhalese Sports Club Ground, Colombo	Home	26 August 2009	Won	
21	137 ‡	India	3	3	3/3	Brabourne Stadium, Mumbai	Away	2 December 2009	Lost	
22	103 ‡	India	3	1	1/3	Galle International Stadium, Galle	Home	18 July 2010	Won	
23	219 † ‡	India	3	1	2/3	Sinhalese Sports Club Ground, Colombo	Home	26 July 2010	Drawn	
24	150 † ‡	West Indies	3	1	2/3	R. Premadasa Stadium, Colombo	Home	23 November 2010	Drawn	
25	119 ‡	England	3	3	3/3	Rose Bowl, Southampton	Away	16 June 2011	Drawn	
26	211 †	Pakistan	3	3	1/3	Sheikh Zayed Stadium, Abu Dhabi	Neutral	18 October 2011	Drawn	
27	144 †	Pakistan	3	1	3/3	Sharjah Cricket Association Stadium, Sharjah	Neutral	3 November 2011	Drawn	
28	108	South Africa	3	3	2/3	Kingsmead Cricket Ground, Durban	Away	26 December 2011	Won	
29	199* †	Pakistan	3	1	1/3	Galle International Stadium, Galle	Home	22 June 2012	Won	
30	192	Pakistan	3	2	2/3	Sinhalese Sports Club Ground, Colombo	Home	4 July 2012	Drawn	
31	142	Bangladesh	3	1	1/2	Galle International Stadium, Galle	Home	8 March 2013	Drawn	
32	105	Bangladesh	3	3	1/2	Galle International Stadium, Galle	Home	8 March 2013	Drawn	
33	139	Bangladesh	3	2	2/2	R. Premadasa Stadium, Colombo	Home	16 March 2013	Won	
34	319 †	Bangladesh	3	1	2/2	Zohur Ahmed Chowdhury Stadium, Chittagong	Away	4 February 2014	Drawn	
35	105 †	Bangladesh	3	3	2/2	Zohur Ahmed Chowdhury Stadium, Chittagong	Away	7 February 2014	Drawn	
36	147	England	3	2	1/2	Lord's, London	Away	14 June 2014	Drawn	
37	221	Pakistan	3	2	1/2	Galle International Stadium, Galle	Home	8 August 2014	Won	
38	203	New Zealand	3	2	2/2	Basin Reserve, Wellington	Away	4 January 2015	Lost	

== One Day International centuries ==
No.	Score	Against	Pos.	Inn.	SR	Venue	H/A/N	Date	Result	Ref
1	100* †	Pakistan	4	1	90.09	Sharjah Cricket Association Stadium, Sharjah	Neutral	4 April 2003	Lost	
2	103*	Kenya	4	1	95.37	Sharjah Cricket Association Stadium, Sharjah	Neutral	6 April 2003	Won	
3	101	Australia	3	2	91.81	R. Premadasa Stadium, Colombo	Home	27 February 2004	Lost	
4	138*	India	1	1	93.87	Sawai Mansingh Stadium, Jaipur	Away	31 October 2005	Lost	
5	109 †	Bangladesh	3	1	87.20	Zohur Ahmed Chowdhury Stadium, Chittagong	Away	25 February 2006	Won	
6	110 †	India	4	1	86.61	Madhavrao Scindia Cricket Ground, Rajkot	Away	11 February 2007	Won	
7	128 †	India	3	1	82.58	Adelaide Oval, Adelaide	Neutral	19 February 2008	Lost	
8	101 †	Bangladesh	2	1	110.98	Gaddafi Stadium, Lahore	Neutral	25 June 2008	Won	
9	112 †	Pakistan	2	1	101.81	National Stadium, Karachi	Away	29 June 2008	Won	
10	121	Bangladesh	2	1	94.53	National Stadium, Karachi	Neutral	30 June 2008	Won	
11	111 † ‡	New Zealand	3	1	86.71	Wankhede Stadium, Mumbai	Neutral	18 March 2011	Won	
12	102 †	South Africa	3	2	105.15	Wanderers Stadium, Johannesburg	Away	22 January 2012	Won	
13	105	India	3	1	120.68	Bellerive Oval, Hobart	Neutral	28 February 2012	Lost	
14	133	India	3	2	88.07	Mahinda Rajapaksa International Stadium, Hambantota	Home	21 July 2012	Lost	
15	134*	England	3	2	99.25	The Oval, London	Away	13 June 2013	Won	
16	169 †	South Africa	3	1	123.35	R. Premadasa Stadium, Colombo	Home	20 July 2013	Won	
17	128 †	Bangladesh	3	1	111.30	Sher-e-Bangla National Cricket Stadium, Dhaka	Away	20 February 2014	Won	
18	103 †	India	3	2	122.61	Khan Shaheb Osman Ali Stadium, Fatullah	Neutral	28 February 2014	Won	
19	112	England	3	1	107.69	Lord's, London	Away	31 May 2014	Won	
20	112 †	England	3	1	100.00	Pallekele International Cricket Stadium, Pallekele	Home	13 December 2014	Won	
21	113* †	New Zealand	3	1	107.61	Westpac Stadium, Wellington	Away	29 January 2015	Won	
22	105*	Bangladesh	3	1	138.15	Melbourne Cricket Ground, Melbourne	Neutral	26 February 2015	Won	
23	117* †	England	3	2	136.04	Westpac Stadium, Wellington	Neutral	1 March 2015	Won	
24	104	Australia	3	2	97.19	Sydney Cricket Ground, Sydney	Away	8 March 2015	Lost	
25	124 †	Scotland	3	1	130.52	Bellerive Oval, Hobart	Neutral	11 March 2015	Won	
