= Cricket Fever: Mumbai Indians =

2019 Indian documentary television series

- Genre: Sports documentary
- Starring: Rohit Sharma; Mahela Jayawardene; Shane Bond; Hardik Pandya; Krunal Pandya; Jasprit Bumrah; Kieron Pollard; Ben Cutting; Mitchell McClenaghan; Evin Lewis; Mustafizur Rahman; Ishan Kishan; Suryakumar Yadav; Aditya Tare; Mayank Markande; Siddhesh Lad; Robin Singh; Akash Ambani; Nita Ambani
- Composer: Matthew Abeysekera
- Country of origin: India
- Original language: English
- No. of seasons: 1
- No. of episodes: 8

Production
- Executive producers: Alexander Edgington; Joe LaBracio; Jeremy Finn; James Maby; Jamie Stewart
- Producers: Tom Dalzell; Rhys Dyer; Krishnendu Bose; Madhurima Sen Bose
- Cinematography: Steve Lidgerwood
- Editor: Steve Prestimon
- Running time: 40 minutes
- Production company: Condé Nast Entertainment

Original release
- Network: Netflix
- Release: 1 March 2019

Cricket Fever: Mumbai Indians is a 2019 Indian sports documentary television series that follows the 2018 season of the Indian Premier League (IPL) franchise, the Mumbai Indians, as they seek to defend their 2017 championship. The series was produced by Condé Nast Entertainment and premiered worldwide on Netflix on 1 March 2019. Cricket Fever is the first international series produced by Condé Nast Entertainment, and the first Indian sports documentary on Netflix.

== Synopsis ==
The eight-part series begins with the 2018 IPL auction and ends with Mumbai Indians final league stage match after they failed to make the playoffs of the 2018 season.

== Episodes ==
No. in season	Title
1	"Mumbai! Mumbai!"
2	"Superstars vs. Superstars"
3	"Fearless Cricket"
4	"Bad to Worse"
5	"Grudge Match"
6	"Put up a Fight"
7	"Make or Break"
8	"We Live to See Another Day"

== Production ==
Condé Nast Entertainment Executive Vice President Alexander Edgington stated that a show about cricket was viewed as an obvious option in its discussions with Netflix to create content targeting the Indian market. Edgington stated, "In India, cricket is absolutely part of everyone's DNA. The things that people are about in India are Bollywood and cricket. The challenge was to make it appeal to people who only have a little familiarity with the game, but also to appeal to Indian audiences who don't need it to be explained what a googly is." Edgington also stated that one of the reasons for selecting the Mumbai Indians as the focus of the series was because the team is owned by the Ambani family, and he felt that they would also attract interest from audiences.

On 4 February 2019, Netflix announced that the series would be released in 190 countries on 1 March 2019.

== Reception ==
Firstpost's review of the series noted, "despite a flaw or two, Netflix docu-series on Mumbai Indians has enough novelty to keep you invested". Medium wrote that the "main problem that Cricket Fever suffers from is the lack of a focused narrative" but concluded that "if you're an Indian and if you are a Mumbai Indians or IPL fan, Cricket Fever is a must watch."

The Indian Express and The Hindustan Times gave the series a rating of 3.5 stars out of 5. NDTV gave the series a rating of 3 stars out of 5.

Decider felt the series was enjoyable even for viewers who are not familiar with cricket, writing, "Listen, we know nothing about cricket; but that doesn’t mean that we found Cricket Fever boring. Quite the contrary; the show has all of the elements of a good behind-the-scenes sports docuseries along the lines of HBO's Hard Knocks. It has established its characters and storyline, and endeavors to profile a team that's out to prove something that season, even if they are the IPL's equivalent of the New England Patriots." The website concluded by recommending that readers stream the series.
