= Kumar Sangakkara =

Sri Lankan cricket commentator and former cricketer (born 1977)

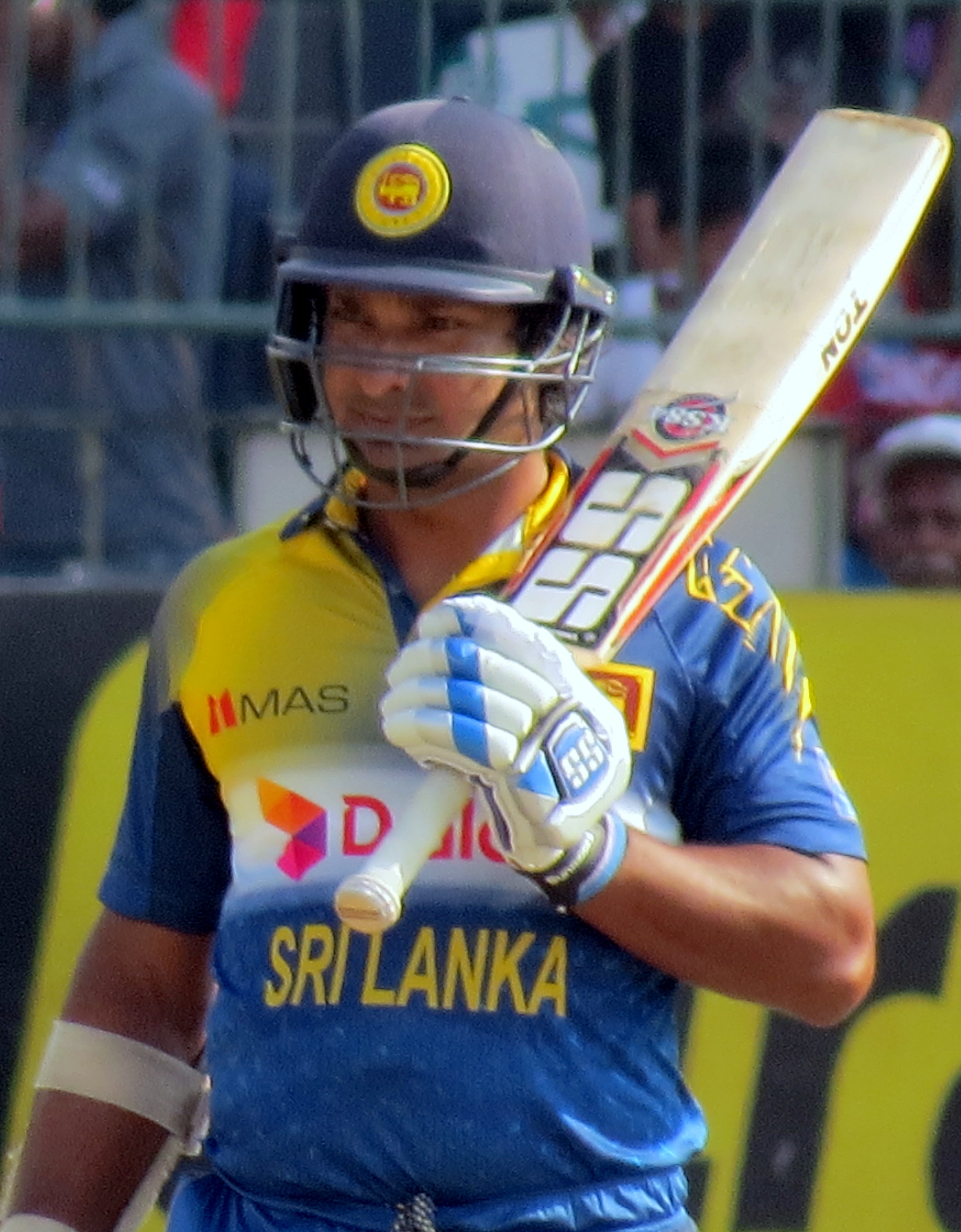

Personal information
- Full name: Kumar Chokshanada Sangakkara
- Born: 27 October 1977 (age 49); Matale, Sri Lanka
- Nickname: Sanga
- Height: 5 ft 10 in (1.78 m)
- Batting: Left-handed
- Bowling: Right-arm off break
- Role: Wicket-keeper-batter

International information
- National side: Sri Lanka (2000–2015)
- Test debut (cap 84): 20 July 2000 v South Africa
- Last Test: 20 August 2015 v India
- ODI debut (cap 105): 5 July 2000 v Pakistan
- Last ODI: 18 March 2015 v South Africa
- ODI shirt no.: 84 (2000–2007); 11 (2007–2015)
- T20I debut (cap 10): 15 June 2006 v England
- Last T20I: 6 April 2014 v India
- T20I shirt no.: 11

Domestic team information
- Years: Team
- 1998–2014: Nondescripts
- 2007–2014: Kandurata
- 2007: Warwickshire
- 2008–2010: Kings XI Punjab
- 2011–2012: Deccan Chargers
- 2013: Sunrisers Hyderabad
- 2013–2017: Jamaica Tallawahs
- 2014: Durham
- 2014: Udarata Rulers
- 2015–2017: Surrey
- 2015–2017: Dhaka Dynamites
- 2015/16-2016/17: Hobart Hurricanes
- 2016: Quetta Gladiators
- 2017: Karachi Kings
- 2018: Multan Sultans

Head coaching information
- Years: Team
- 2026–present: Rajasthan Royals

Career statistics
Competition	Test	ODI	T20I	FC
Matches	134	404	56	260
Runs scored	12,400	14,234	1,382	20,911
Batting average	57.40	41.98	31.40	52.40
100s/50s	38/52	25/93	0/8	64/86
Top score	319	169	78	319
Balls bowled	84	–	–	246
Wickets	0	–	–	1
Bowling average	–	–	–	150.00
5 wickets in innings	–	–	–	0
10 wickets in match	–	–	–	0
Best bowling	–	–	–	1/13
Catches/stumpings	182/20	403/98	25/20	373/33
Medal record
Men's Cricket
Representing Sri Lanka
ICC Cricket World Cup
Runner-up	2007 West Indies
Runner-up	2011 India–Sri Lanka–Bangladesh
Champions Trophy
Winner	2002 Sri Lanka
T20 World Cup
Winner	2014 Bangladesh
Runner-up	2009 England
Runner-up	2012 Sri Lanka
Asia Cup
Winner	2004 Sri Lanka
Winner	2008 Pakistan
Winner	2014 Bangladesh
Runner-up	2010 Sri Lanka
- Source: ESPNcricinfo, 19 April 2024

Kumar Chokshanada Sangakkara (Sinhala: කුමාර් චොක්ශනාද සංගක්කාර; born 27 October 1977) is a Sri Lankan cricket commentator and former cricketer. He represented Sri Lanka from 2000 to 2015 and captained the team in all three international formats. Born in Matale, Central Province, Sangakkara played first-class cricket for Nondescripts Cricket Club from 1997–98 to 2013–14 and for Surrey County Cricket Club from 2015 to 2017. He was a member of the Sri Lankan teams that won the 2001-02 Asian Test Championship, 2002 ICC Champions Trophy and 2014 T20 World Cup.

Sangakkara played mostly as a wicket-keeper-batter and is generally regarded as one of the greatest wicket-keeper-batters in cricket history. His 38 Test centuries and 25 in ODIs are both highest for a wicket-keeper. He batted left-handed and, although he rarely bowled, was a right-arm off spinner. Combining all three forms of international cricket, Sangakkara is the third-highest run-scorer in international cricket, having amassed a total of 28,016 including 63 centuries.

He has received four individual ICC awards. In 2012 he won Sir Garfield Sobers Trophy (ICC Cricketer of the Year) and ICC Test Cricketer of the Year. Also he won ICC ODI Cricketer of the Year twice in 2011 and 2013.

He was named Wisden Leading Men's Cricketer in the World for both 2011 and 2014.

As of July 2025, Sangakkara is one of only 15 players to have scored 10,000 or more runs in Test cricket, and has the highest average of those who have achieved this feat.

Since retirement, he has worked as a commentator for Sky Sports and served as President of the MCC from October 2019 to September 2021. In January 2021, Sangakkara also became the coach of Rajasthan Royals in the Indian Premier League from 2021-2024.He was inducted into the ICC Cricket Hall of Fame in June 2021, the second Sri Lankan player to be inducted after Muttiah Muralitharan.

== Early life ==
Kumar Sangakkara was born in Matale, Central Province, on 27 October 1977. He is the fourth and youngest child of Kshema, a civil lawyer, and Kumari Sangakkara. Kumar was brought up in the family home near Kandy. His father was very keen on sport and would daily spend hours coaching his children.

Sangakkara's childhood, youth and most of his cricket career were set against the background of the ruinous Sri Lankan Civil War (1983–2009) between the Tamil militants (mainly the Tamil Tigers) and the government of Sri Lanka. It is generally held that the war began with the Black July riots in 1983. During Black July, Sangakkara's parents offered shelter to Tamil families, whom six-year-old Kumar viewed as his friends.

He was educated at Trinity College, Kandy. Musically talented, he was a chorister and played the violin. He excelled in several sports and his mother Kumari wanted him to concentrate on his best one. The choice was between cricket and tennis. Kumari sought the advice of college principal Leonard de Alwis, who said Kumar should focus on cricket. The Sangakkaras are a sporting family and Kumar's three elder siblings all excelled in sports at Trinity. His two sisters, Thushari and Saranga, played basketball and tennis respectively, both at representative level. Saranga won a national tennis championship. Kumar's elder brother Vemindra represented the college in both cricket and badminton.

Sangakkara represented his school's Under-13, under-15, under-17, and first XI teams. In August 1994, when he was 16, he went to Kuala Lumpur with Sri Lanka's national under-19 team and played in two one-day matches against Bangladesh under-19s. Even so, he modestly described himself as a "run-of-the-mill" cricketer while he was at school, but he said facing real competition at Nondescripts Cricket Club spurred him on to improve his game and strive to reach a high standard. Academically successful, he was the school's Senior Prefect (Head Boy) and received its Trinity Lion and Ryde Gold Medal awards. He passed the Advance Level Examination and gained entry to the Faculty of Law at the University of Colombo. However, he had to indefinitely postpone his law degree due to his cricketing commitments; he said in 2011 that he would consider finishing it after his cricket career ended.

== Playing career ==
=== 1997 to 2002 ===
==== Nondescripts and the under-19s ====
After he entered the University of Colombo in 1996, Sangakkara joined Nondescripts who were one of the city's most notable clubs and he spent most of his domestic career, until 2014, with them. Having played for Sri Lanka under-19s while he was still at school, he made further appearances for the team in the 1996–97 season. In February 1997, he played in three Under-19 Tests against the touring India under-19 team, though he did not keep wicket. In the second match, he was run out for 96 in Sri Lanka's first innings. In March, he played in three Under-19 One-Day Internationals (ODIs) against India under-19s.

==== First-class and List A debuts ====
Sangakkara began his professional career in the 1997–98 season when he was 20 years old. He made his List A debut on 28 December 1997 in a 50-over match, playing for Nondescripts against Bloomfield Cricket and Athletic Club at the Sinhalese Sports Club Ground in Colombo. The match was a Hatna Trophy semi-final which Nondescripts won by 71 runs. Sangakkara scored 18 in a total of 211. Nondescripts went on to win the tournament, defeating Tamil Union by 5 wickets in the final.

Soon afterwards, on 9 January 1998, he made his first-class debut in a Saravanamuttu Trophy match, also against Bloomfield C&A, at the Nondescripts Cricket Club Ground in Colombo. This was a three-day national championship match which ended in a draw. Sangakkara kept wicket and was seventh in the Nondescripts batting order. He held three catches and, in his only innings, scored six runs. He played in six championship matches that season. Nondescripts finished third in Group A of the competition and marginally failed to gain a place in the play-offs.

In the 1998–99 season, the Saravanamuttu Trophy was rebranded as the Premier Championship and Sangakkara played in fourteen matches from January to June 1999. He had only moderate success as a batter, scoring 444 runs with a highest innings of 55; but he made his mark as a wicket-keeper by completing 33 dismissals (32 catches and one stumping). The two group system was abandoned and the championship became a straight league competition in which the sixteen teams played each other once. Nondescripts, with four wins in their fifteen matches, finished fifth. During the season, Sangakkara played in five one-day matches for Sri Lanka B in a triangular tournament with Sri Lanka A and the English team Leicestershire, who were on tour.

==== Sri Lanka A (1999–2000) ====
In November 1999, Sangakkara was selected for the Sri Lanka A team's tour of South Africa. It was at this point that he decided to abandon his degree course and leave university. On the tour, he played in three limited overs and two first-class matches against South Africa A, his best performance being an innings of 89 in one of the limited overs games. On 20 May 2000, playing in a limited overs match for Sri Lanka A against the touring Zimbabwe A at the De Soysa Stadium in Moratuwa, Sangakkara played an outstanding innings of 156 not out, which helped him to obtain a place in Sri Lanka's national team two months later.

He played in seven Premier Championship matches for Nondescripts in 1999–2000, but the team had a poor season. The two groups format was revived with Nondescripts in Group A and finishing fifth. Nondescripts played in Group B of the Premier Limited Overs Tournament but they again disappointed and did not qualify for the play-offs.

==== Test and ODI debuts (July 2000) ====
In July 2000, Sri Lanka hosted the Singer Triangular Series between themselves, Pakistan, and South Africa. The teams played each other twice in a round-robin league format and the top two, South Africa and Sri Lanka, qualified for the final which Sri Lanka won by 30 runs. Sangakkara made his One Day International (ODI) debut in the opening match when Sri Lanka played Pakistan at the Galle International Stadium on 5 July. Pakistan batted first and scored 164/8 from their 45 overs (reduced from 50 because of a delay caused by bad weather). Sangakkara kept wicket and made an important contribution when he caught Mohammad Yousuf off Nuwan Zoysa for a first-ball "duck". Sri Lanka needed only 37.3 overs to score 166/5 and win the match by five wickets with 45 balls in hand. Sangakkara was fifth in the batting order and made 35 before he was run out by Imran Nazir at 131/4. ESPN's cricket writer Charlie Austin wondered if Sangakkara had "the head for international cricket and also the technique". He was impressed enough to describe Sangakkara as "a down to earth man, both intelligent and mature, who was unfazed by the situation and was immediately off the mark with a fluid square drive".

In the second match, when Sri Lanka played South Africa at Galle on 6 July, Sangakkara was voted Man of the Match after he scored 85 before again being run out, this time by Makhaya Ntini. He shared a fifth wicket partnership of 120 with Russel Arnold (59 not out) and Sri Lanka totalled 249/7 in their 50 overs. South Africa were all out for 212, Sangakkara catching Jonty Rhodes off his first ball, and Sri Lanka won by 37 runs.

Sangakkara played in all five of Sri Lanka's matches in the tournament, dismissing seven batters (3 caught, 4 stumped) and scoring 199 runs at 66.33 to secure his place in the upcoming Test series against South Africa.

He made his Test debut at Galle on 20–23 July in the first match of the three-match series. Sri Lanka won by an innings and 15 runs. In his team's only innings, Sangakkara was fifth in the batting order and had scored 23 when he was dismissed leg before wicket (lbw) by Nicky Boje. Sri Lanka totalled 522 and then bowled South Africa out for 238 and 269 to win with a day to spare. Sangakkara kept wicket and held two catches to dismiss Gary Kirsten in the first innings and Lance Klusener in the second. Both catches were off the bowling of Muttiah Muralitharan who took 13 wickets in the match. Sangakkara also dismissed Kirsten in the second innings when he took a throw from Chaminda Vaas to complete a run out.

==== 2000–01 season ====
Nondescripts won the Premier Championship in 2000–01 but Sangakkara missed most of their matches due to international commitments. In October 2000, he travelled to Nairobi and Sharjah for two limited overs competitions. Sri Lanka reached the final of the Coca-Cola Champions Trophy in Sharjah and defeated India by 245 runs. Batting first, Sri Lanka scored 299/5 in their 50 overs. Sangakkara was bowled for 8 by Sachin Tendulkar. India collapsed and were all out for 54 in just 26 overs, Sangakkara completing two dismissals (a catch and a run out).

From November 2000 to February 2001, he was on overseas tours with Sri Lanka who visited South Africa and New Zealand. In South Africa, he played in three Tests and six ODIs as well as some matches against provincial teams; Sri Lanka were heavily beaten in both series. On the second tour, Sri Lanka played ODIs only against New Zealand and Sangakkara played in all five; Sri Lanka won the series 4–1. Returning home, he played in three Tests and three ODIs against England, who toured Sri Lanka in February and March 2001. England won the Test series 2–1 and Sri Lanka won the ODI series 3–0. The second Test, played at the Asgiriya Stadium in Kandy, was highly controversial because of incompetent umpiring by B. C. Cooray whose errors probably cost Sri Lanka the match and the series. One of the consequences was bad feeling between the players and Sangakkara became involved in a heated argument with Michael Atherton, who was seen to be wagging a finger at him. When asked about it afterwards, Atherton alleged that Sangakkara had called the England team "cheats".

The Premier Championship was re-vamped again so that the top four teams in each of Groups A and B formed a Super League. In this, the eight teams played each other once. Winning teams were awarded twelve points and there were also bonus points for achieving batting and bowling targets. Crucially for Nondescripts, the team with the highest first innings total in a drawn match was awarded eight points. Nondescripts, who had finished second in Group B, won only one Super League match while runners-up Burgher Recreation Club won three; and Burgher had a slight advantage in bonus points gained. What made the difference was that Burgher drew their other four games but led on first innings in only one of them, so their total was 44 plus bonuses. Nondescripts drew their other six games and, in all of them including the one against Burgher, were ahead on first innings for a points total of 60 plus bonuses. Sangakkara was only available for the last two matches including the decisive one against Burgher, although he made little impact. Playing as a specialist batter, he scored only 6 in his one innings. Nondescripts scored 372 and then bowled Burgher out for 125 to claim the first innings points. Burgher followed on and were 79/7 when the match ended in a draw. In the final round of matches, Nondescripts met Colombo Cricket Club while Burgher played Tamil Union. Nondescripts were eight points ahead of Burgher and knew they must gain first innings points at least. Sangakkara again made little impact. After Colombo had been dismissed for 246, he opened the innings and was out for 13. Nondescripts were dismissed for 245 and so, unable to claim first innings points, they had to win the match to remain top of the league. In the second innings, Colombo collapsed and were all out for 141 after off spinner Ruwan Kalpage took a career-best 7/27. Sangakkara scored only 14 and Nondescripts struggled, but they managed to reach 143/7 and win by three wickets. As things turned out, Nondescripts could have lost to Colombo and still won the title because Burgher drew with Tamil Union and were behind on first innings.

==== 2001–02 season ====
Nondescripts won the Premier Limited Overs Tournament in 2001–02 but, as before, Sangakkara's involvement was limited by his international commitments. The only match he played in was the final at the Sinhalese Sports Club Ground in Colombo on 19 January 2002. Nondescripts defeated Tamil Union by 44 runs. Batting third, Sangakkara scored 98 at exactly one run per ball. He shared a second wicket partnership of 153 with Aravinda de Silva (65) and Nondescripts totalled 278/8 from their 50 overs. Tamil Union were all out for 234. Seeking to defend their Premier Championship title, Nondescripts reached the play-off semi-final but lost to Colts by 2 wickets; Sangakkara scored 20 and 37.

Sri Lanka hosted three three-match Test series from August 2001 to January 2002. The visitors were India in August, West Indies in November and December, and Zimbabwe in December and January. Sri Lanka also took part in the 2001–02 Asian Test Championship.

In his first-class career to date, Sangakkara had been dismissed in the nineties three times, twice in Test matches. In the first Test against India at Galle, he scored 105 not out and helped his team to a ten-wicket victory. He scored his second century in the first Test against West Indies, also at Galle, in November. West Indies batted first and scored 448, largely due to an innings of 178 by Brian Lara which ended when Sangakkara caught him behind off the bowling of Muralitharan. Sri Lanka replied with 590/9 declared. Sangakkara made their top score of 140 before he was run out. He shared a third wicket partnership of 162 with Mahela Jayawardene (99), a forerunner of things to come. West Indies collapsed in their second innings and were all out for 144, Sri Lanka needing only six runs to win by 10 wickets.

India had withdrawn from the Asian Test Championship for political reasons but Bangladesh, Pakistan and Sri Lanka continued. The latter two contested the final at the Gaddafi Stadium in March and Sri Lanka won by 8 wickets after Sangakkara scored his first double-century with an innings of 230. Pakistan batted first, totalling 234, and Sri Lanka replied with 528. Sangakkara and Jaywardene (68) added 173 for the third wicket. Pakistan were all out for 325 in their second innings, and Sri Lanka needed only 32 to win. Sangakkara was named Player of the Match.

=== 2002 to 2006 ===
By now an established member of the international team, Sangakkara continued to play mostly for Sri Lanka and travelled worldwide during this period. He toured England in both 2002 and 2006. In between those tours, Sri Lanka played series in each of Australia (3), Bangladesh, India, New Zealand (2), Pakistan, South Africa, West Indies, and Zimbabwe. They hosted home series against Australia, Bangladesh (2), England, New Zealand, Pakistan, South Africa, and West Indies. They were in Kenya and South Africa for the 2003 Cricket World Cup, reaching the semi-finals, and hosted the 2004 Asia Cup, which they won.

In domestic cricket, Nondescripts were unable to challenge for further trophies after their successes in 2001 and 2002. In 2003–04, Sangakkara played in five Premier Championship matches and eight Premier Limited Overs Tournament matches, including the semi-final against Bloomfield, but that was the last season in which he was able to make more than a handful of appearances for them. Apart from 2016 and 2017 when he was playing regular first-class cricket in England for Surrey, 2003–04 was the only season in which Sangakkara achieved the target of a thousand runs. He played in sixteen matches and scored 1,191 runs at 44.11 per completed innings with three centuries and eight fifties. His highest score was 125. He also completed 55 dismissals, by far his highest season total, with 43 catches and 12 stumpings.

==== Twenty20 debuts (2004 and 2006) ====
Twenty20 (T20) was introduced to Sri Lanka on 17 August 2004 when the first round of the 2004 SLC Twenty20 Tournament was played. There were eight matches that day and a total of 176 players, including Sangakkara, made their T20 debuts. Sangakkara played for Nondescripts against Tamil Union at the Moors Sports Club Ground in Colombo. Batting third, he scored 39 off 21 balls as Nondescripts won by 17 runs. Nondescripts then played Colts at the R. Premadasa Stadium in the quarter-final but lost by 4 wickets; Sangakkara again scored 39.

He made his Twenty20 International (T20I) debut on 15 June 2006 when Sri Lanka played England at the Rose Bowl, near Southampton. The match was Sri Lanka's first-ever T20I but the team acquitted themselves well to win by 2 runs. They won the toss and, batting first, were all out for 163 (their last wicket fell to the final ball of the innings). Sangakkara came in fifth and hit 21 from 14 deliveries before he was caught by Andrew Strauss. He kept wicket as England replied and completed a catch and a run out. England were 161/5 when their innings closed. Sangakkara's run out of Marcus Trescothick was a key moment in the match as Trescothick had scored 72 and the match seemed to be going England's way. They needed twelve runs from eight balls after he was out and then needed nine from the 20th over bowled by Dilhara Fernando, who restricted them to six.

==== 2006 in England ====
He made a poor return in his six first-class matches on this tour with only 347 runs at 31.54.

==== Sri Lanka v South Africa, 2006 ====
Sangakkara and Jayawardene set the world record in both Test and first-class cricket for the highest partnership between two batters for any wicket. This was their stand of 624 for the third wicket in the first Test against South Africa in 2006. Sangakkara scored 287 and Jayawardene 374. The partnership is the only one to exceed 600 for any wicket in first-class history In addition, Sangakkara and Jayawardene hold the record for the highest partnership (166 for the 2nd wicket) for any wicket in ICC World T20 history.

=== 2007 to 2017 ===
==== English county cricket ====
Sangakkara played English county cricket with Warwickshire in the 2007 County Championship. In 2010, Sangakkara was contracted to represent Lancashire in the 2010 County Championship, but never represented the club because of international commitments. For the 2015 and 2016 seasons, Sangakkara was contracted to play for Surrey. After his international retirement, Sangakkara continued to play for Surrey and in 2017 scored his 100th century in all formats of the game combined on 13 June 2017.

=== Sri Lanka vice-captain (2006–2009) ===
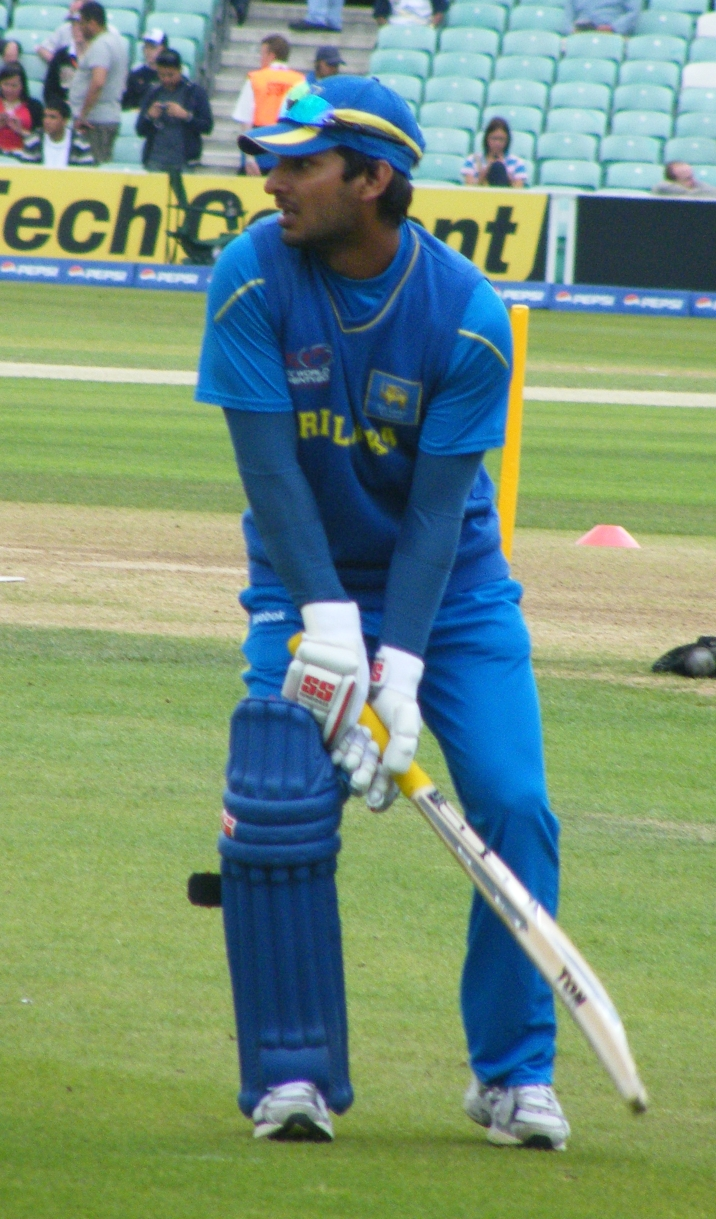
Sangakkara in 2009

When Sri Lanka toured Bangladesh in February 2006 regular captain Marvan Atapattu was injured and Mahela Jayawardene became captain while Sangakkara was made vice-captain. Pakistan toured Sri Lanka for two Test and three ODIs in March 2006, and with Atapattu still injured Jayawardene and Sangakkara remained captain and vice-captain respectively. The pair had only expected to hold the positions on an interim basis, but extended into a third series as Atapattu failed to recover in time to tour England in April and ended up filling the roles full-time. In July 2006, Sangakkara made his second-highest Test score to-date (287) against South Africa. In a record-breaking partnership with Mahela Jayawardene, he set up the world record for the highest partnership in Test cricket—624 runs—in this match.

By this time, Sangakkara was effectively playing as a specialist batter in Test cricket, his wicket-keeping duties having been handed over to Prasanna Jayawardene. Sangakkara continued to play as a wicket-keeper-batter in the limited overs forms.

On 6 December 2007 he made it to the top spot of ICC Test player rankings with a rating of 938, the highest rating ever achieved by a Sri Lankan player, and became the first batsman ever to score in excess of 150 in four consecutive tests. His skill was recognised worldwide when he earned selection for the ICC World XI One-Day International team that competed against Australia in the Johnnie Walker Series in October 2005. Despite the World XI losing all of the one-day games by considerable margins, Sangakkara left the series with some credit, averaging 46. He was one of the winners of the 2008 inaugural ESPN cricinfo awards for outstanding batting in Test cricket. He was once again named in the World Test XI by the ICC in 2010.

Sangakkara holds the record for being the fastest man to 8,000, 9,000, 10,000 (jointly held), 11,000 and 12,000 runs in Test cricket. During Sri Lanka's tour to England in May 2006, he was named the vice-captain of the team. On 3 March 2009, a terrorist attack on the Sri Lankan team convoy in Pakistan injured 6 Sri Lankan players including Sangakkara. Sangakkara suffered shrapnel wounds in his shoulder. In November 2006, Sangakkara was included in the ICC World XI Test team. Next year, he signed an agreement to join Warwickshire County Cricket Club. That year, he scored back-to-back double centuries in Tests and became only the fifth cricketer in the history to do so.

Sangakkara was in the Sri Lanka teams which reached the finals of the 2007 Cricket World Cup, the 2011 Cricket World Cup, the 2009 ICC World Twenty20 and the 2012 ICC World Twenty20. He won several awards including:

- ICC ODI Player of the Year: 2011, 2013
- Wisden Leading Cricketer in the World: 2011, 2014
- Wisden Cricketer of the Year: 2012
- ICC Cricketer of the Year: 2012
- ICC Test Player of the Year: 2012
- Wisden India Cricketer of the Year: 2013
- Surrey cap: 2015

=== Indian Premier League ===
Sangakkara has played in five seasons of the Indian Premier League (IPL). Winning bids for him in 2008 and 2011 were US$700,000 by Kings XI Punjab and US$300,000 by Deccan Chargers, respectively. He was the captain of the Sunrisers Hyderabad team. Sangakkara has scored 1567 runs with 10 half-centuries in 62 matches in IPL.

In January 2021, Sangakkara was named the director of cricket of Rajasthan Royals ahead of the IPL 2021, and subsequently the team's head coach. With Rajasthan, he played a crucial role in leading them to the 2022 Indian Premier League final.

=== Sri Lanka Premier League ===
In the Sri Lanka Premier League which officially started in 2012, Sangakkara was named the captain and icon player of the Kandurata Warriors franchise. Unfortunately, he couldn't participate as a player in the inaugural edition in 2012 as he suffered a finger injury weeks before the tournament during a One Day International against India. However, he appeared as a television commentator during some matches.

=== Caribbean Premier League ===
On 18 August 2013, Sangakkarra joined the Jamaica Tallawahs of the Caribbean Premier League.

=== Sri Lanka captaincy ===
Sangakkara's record as captain
	Matches	Won	Lost	Drawn	No result
Test	15	5	3	7	–
ODI	45	27	14	–	4
T20I	21	12	9	–	–

In February 2009, the then captain of the Sri Lankan team, Mahela Jayawardene announced that he would step down from the captaincy "in the best interests of the Sri Lankan team". He said he believed that it would give his successor around two years to build up to the 2011 Cricket World Cup. Therefore, at the age of 31 and with the experience of 80 Tests and 246 ODIs, Sangakkara succeeded Jayawardene as Sri Lanka's captain in all formats of the game. His first engagement in the role was the 2009 ICC World Twenty20 hosted by England in June. Sri Lanka became runners-up in the series after winning all the game in group and knock-out stages and being defeated by Pakistan in the final. Sangakkara made 64 not-out in the final, but was unable to take Sri Lanka for the championship. He was named in the 'Team of the Tournament' by ESPNcricinfo for the 2009 T20I World Cup.

Sri Lanka failed to reach to the knock-out stage of the ICC Champions Trophy in September 2009. The next Indian tour proved to be disastrous for the team, with Sri Lanka being beaten by India in Test series 2–0 and ODI series 3–1.

Sri Lankan team under the captaincy of Sangakkara gained momentum and won the next Tri-series in Bangladesh, Zimbabwe and Sri Lanka, beating India as well. The Sri Lankans' tour of Australia proved to be very successful, in winning both the T20 and ODI series. This was Sri Lanka's first ever series victory in Australia.

A month in advance of the 2011 World Cup in March, Sangakkara decided that he would resign the captaincy after the tournament. Sri Lanka reached the final of the tournament. Throughout the tournament Sangakkara was in prolific form with the bat scoring 465 runs from 9 matches and was the third highest run-scorer behind teammate Tillakaratne Dilshan and India's Sachin Tendulkar. He was named as captain and wicket-keeper of the 'Team of the Tournament' for the 2011 World Cup by the ICC. He was also named in the 'Team of the Tournament' by ESPNcricinfo. During the final, loud crowd noise prevented match referee Jeff Crowe from hearing Sri Lankan captain Sangakkara's call as the coin was tossed by Indian captain Dhoni. The toss had to be redone – an extremely unusual event, especially at as prominent an event as the World Cup final. He also criticised the decision of ICC in its attempt to tweak and alter the 2.5-metre rule while a tournament was in progress.

Days after guiding Sri Lanka to the finals of the World Cup, Sangakkara announced to the public he was stepping down as captain of the T20 and ODI teams. He offered to continue as Test captain if deemed necessary for transition to new skipper, but Dilshan was appointed captain across all formats. Reflecting on the decision afterwards, he said that "captaining Sri Lanka is a job that ages you very quickly ... It's rarely a job you will last long in ... I also had a two-year stint, and I enjoyed it at times, certainly on the field where our results showed we were one of the top two sides in the world for one-and-a-half years, especially in the shorter form of the game."

The same year, he was named the ODI Cricketer of the Year at the ICC awards ceremony. In 2012, he was honoured as one of the Wisden Cricketers of the Year.

=== Internationals (2011–2014) ===
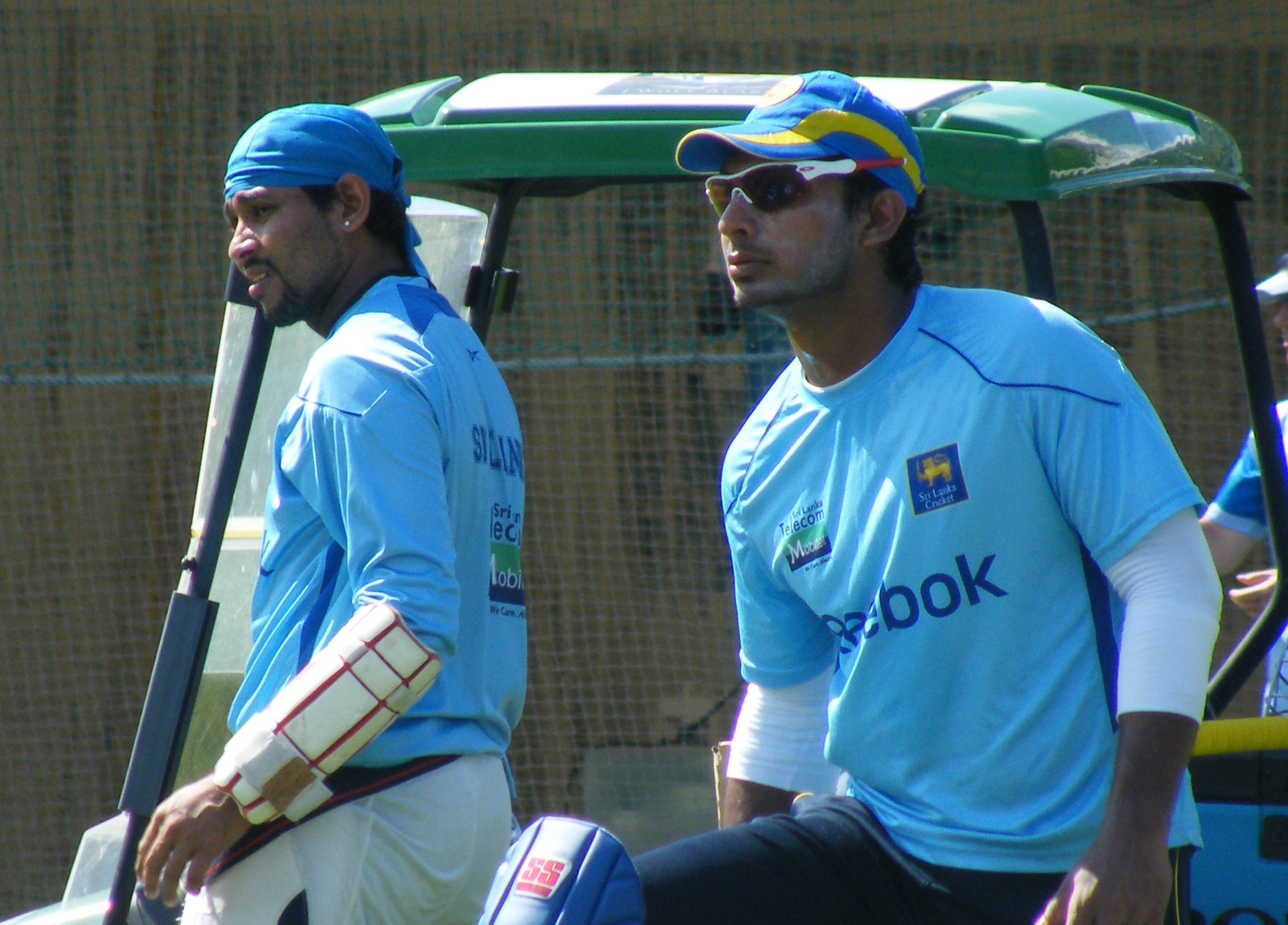
Sangakkara (right) resigned from the captaincy after the 2011 World Cup and was succeeded by Tillakaratne Dilshan (left).

Sri Lanka's first fixture after the World Cup was a Sri Lanka tour of England in 2011 beginning in May. During the second match of a three Test series Tillakaratne Dilshan, Sangakkara's successor as captain, suffered a broken thumb. Sangakkara filled in while Dilshan was off the pitch and formally assumed the captaincy for the final Test. The match ended in a draw and the series ended in a 1–0 victory for England; Sangakarra scored a century in the match, his first against England in nine Tests.

Sangakkara was named the man of the series in Test series with Pakistan in 2011/12—his first man of the series award in Test cricket. He made 516 runs in the 3 match series which was won by Pakistan 1–0. On August in 2013, he was named the ODI Cricketer of the Year, wicket-keeper-captain of the ICC World XI Test team, and won the ICC People's Choice Award in the 2011 ICC Awards. In 2012, he was named one of the Wisden's five Cricketers of the Year. He was also named as captain and wicket-keeper of the 2011 World Test XI by the ICC and named in the 2012 World Test XI and ODI XI.

In 2012, Sangakkara received the Sir Garfield Sobers Trophy having been elected ICC Cricketer of the Year. For his achievements in 2011, he was one of the five Wisden Cricketers of the Year in the 2012 edition of Wisden Cricketers' Almanack. In the same edition, he was named the 2011 Wisden Leading Cricketer in the World and he won this award again in the 2015 edition for his achievements in 2014, the first player to win the award twice (subsequently, Virat Kohli and Ben Stokes have won it three times each).

Sangakkara struggled with his form when England toured Sri Lanka in 2012. He failed to score a half century during The Two Test match series. But he regained his form in the ODI series against Pakistan where his batting score reached the 90s. In the Test series that followed, Sangakkara continued his form with a 199, the scoreboard originally said he had scored the double century but it turned out to be a mistake. Sri Lanka later won the Test match. He followed this up with 192 in the same game, again missing out on the double century. The next two matches were drawn, which meant Sri Lanka won the series 1–0. This was their first time winning a Test series since the retirement of Muttiah Muralitharan.

Sangakkara's results in international matches
	Matches	Won	Lost	Drawn	Tied	No result
Test	134*	54	42	37	0	–
ODI	404	217	167	–	2	17
T20I	56	34	20	–	1	1

On the Sri Lankan tour of Bangladesh in 2014, Sangakkara hit his highest test score to date with 319 in the first innings of the second test. Making him only the third Sri Lankan player to hit a triple century after Sanath Jayasuriya and Mahela Jayawardene. He followed his triple century with a knock of 105 in the 2nd innings and the game finished as a draw. He continued his good batting run with another century in the 2nd ODI.

Along with teammate Mahela Jayawardene, he recorded the most partnership runs for the 3rd wicket in Test history, scoring 5890 runs surpassing the 5826 runs of Rahul Dravid and Sachin Tendulkar, during the first Test match against Pakistan at Galle International Stadium. The two also hold the record for the highest partnership for any wicket in Test matches, scoring 624 runs for the 3rd wicket against South Africa in July 2006. This still stands as the largest partnership for any wicket in first-class cricket, anywhere.

His impressive form with the bat continued at the 2014 Asia Cup where he amassed a total of 245 runs in five innings. He started the tournament with a 63 against Pakistan before hitting a match winning 103 against India. He then added scores of 77 and 2 against Afghanistan and Bangladesh before being dismissed for a golden duck in the final against Pakistan. Sri Lanka went on to win the game and the tournament.

=== Bangladesh Premier League ===
In 2015, he was signed by Dhaka Dynamites for the 2015–16 Bangladesh Premier League. He was the leading run scorer of that season, scoring 349 runs in 10 matches. He was retained by Dhaka Dynamites for the 2016–17 Bangladesh Premier League.

=== Pakistan Super League ===
In 2015, Sangakkara joined the Quetta Gladiators of the Pakistan Super League. He was later released by the franchise and was picked by Karachi Kings as captain for the 2017 edition. Under his captaincy team reached play-offs. The following year, in the 3rd edition of PSL, Sangakkara was picked by Multan Sultans.

=== Return to county cricket ===
Before Sri Lanka's Test series against England in 2014, Sangakkara returned to county cricket, playing two matches for Durham, which included 159 against Sussex in his final innings. On 16 January 2015, it was announced that he would be joining Surrey on a two-year contract. Sangakkara scored a brilliant century against Glamorgan, where he scored 149 runs, which was his maiden century for Surrey in this county season. After the match, he said that he was willing to see the comeback of English batsman Kevin Pietersen to international cricket.

Sangakkara represented Surrey from 2015 till 2017, helping them win Division Two of LV= 2015 County Championship and gaining promotion to Division One for the Specsavers 2016 County Championship season. Surrey also reached the finals of 2015 Royal London One-Day Cup before losing by six runs to Gloucestershire.

=== Final season (2017) ===
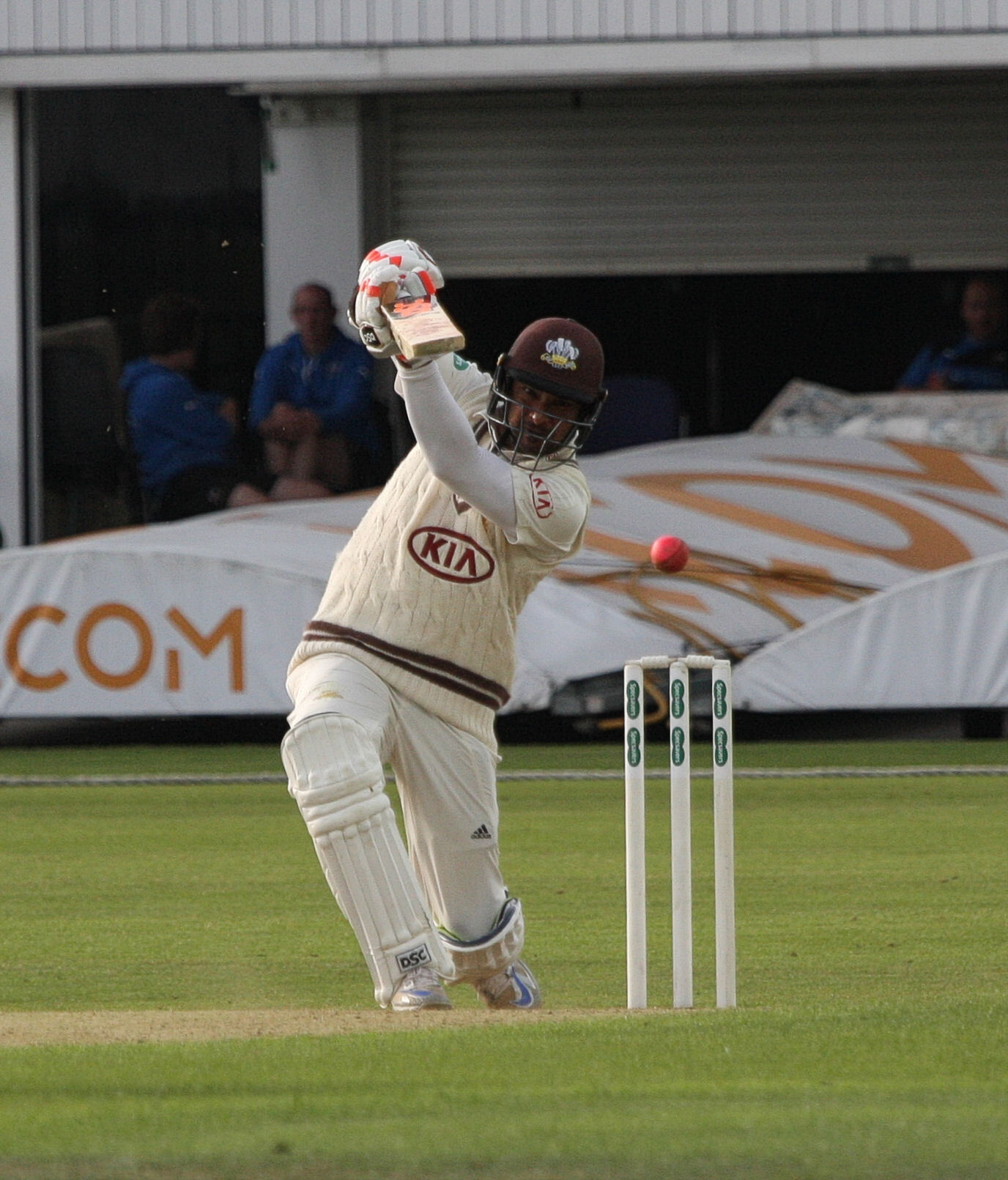
Sangakkara batting for Surrey in 2017.

On 22 May 2017, Sangakkara announced that the following season would be his last in first-class cricket. He made the announcement after scoring four consecutive centuries becoming the fourth Surrey batsman to achieve this feat (Ian Ward was the last to do it in 2002), pass 20,000 first-class and having scored 592 runs in the said four games. He scored the fifth consecutive century on 26 May against Essex at the County Cricket Ground, Chelmsford. becoming only the eighth player to achieve this feat. In the quarter-final of the Royal London One-Day Cup against Yorkshire, he scored 121 from as many balls, which became his 100th century in all formats of the game combined, that now included 61 in first-class and 39 in List A games. Sangakkara became the first batsman to reach 1,000 runs for the season when he brought up his sixth century for the season against Yorkshire.

=== MCC ===
On the 2020 MCC tour of Pakistan, with all matches played in Lahore, Sangakkara played in all matches, registering 25 runs in the first T20 match with 1 catch behind the stumps, 3 runs in the only LA game (where he did not keep wicket), 1 catch behind the stumps and 10 with the bat in the second T20, and 52 and 1 catch keeping wicket in the third and tour-ending T20, giving him a total of 3 dismissals credited to his name and 90 runs in total on the tour, giving him a T20 average of 30 and a tour average of 22.5.

=== Cricket All-Stars Series ===
Sangakkara, though retired from international cricket, participated in the 2015 Cricket All-Stars Series for Warne's Warriors under Shane Warne's captaincy. In the three T20 matches, he scored 153 runs, more than any other cricketer in the series, and included one fifty. His average in the series was 51.00. He also hit the most fours and sixes, 12 apiece. For his overall performance, Sangakkara was judged player of the series.

=== Masters Champions League ===
Sangakkara also played for Gemini Arabians in the first edition of Masters Champions League T20 tournament which took place in the UAE. In the first match against Gemini and Libra Legends, Sangakkara scored 86 runs from just 43 balls and helped the team post a huge total of 234 runs in their allotted 20 overs. Libra Legends only scored 156 in their 20 overs and thus Gemini Arabians won the match courtesy of Sangakkara's knock. Sangakkara was also awarded man of the match. Sangakkara scored four consecutive fifties (65, 51, 51, 62) in the other matches played during the series, this secured a place in the final for the Arabians. In the final against Leo Lions, he scored 30 runs to become top run scorer of the series. His team won the series and remained undefeated throughout the tournament. Sangakkara won player of the series for his 386 runs with 5 fifties.

=== 2014 ICC World Twenty20 ===
Sangakkara won the Man of the Match award in the 2014 ICC World Twenty20 Final and was part of the Sri Lankan team who won the 2014 ICC World Twenty20. He decided to retire from T20 internationals after playing in that tournament and, afterwards, Jayawardene followed him into retirement. Sangakkara under-performed in the World T20 until, in the final against India, he scored 52 not out off 33 balls and help his team win their second ICC trophy since 1996.

=== Later international matches ===
Sri Lanka played their first 7-match ODI series at home, against England, from 26 November to 16 December 2014. On 3 December 2014 Sangakkara reached 13,000 runs in One-day internationals in the third match of the series at the Mahinda Rajapaksa International Stadium, Hambantota, and became the fourth player in One-day history to achieve the feat after Sachin Tendulkar, Ricky Ponting, and Sanath Jayasuriya. He also became the second most prolific half-century maker in One-day internationals during this match. He scored 4 consecutive half-centuries followed by a century. On 13 December 2014, he scored his 20th ODI century, becoming the second Sri Lankan to score 20 ODI centuries, after 28 by Sanath Jayasuriya, and 9th overall to do so. He also took 4 catches as a wicket-keeper in this match taking the player of the match award. This match was his last match in his hometown due to his retirement from the ODI arena after the 2015 Cricket World Cup.

His last One-day innings in Sri Lanka was played on 13 December 2014 in the last match of the England ODI series. He was caught while on 33 in his last innings on home soil.

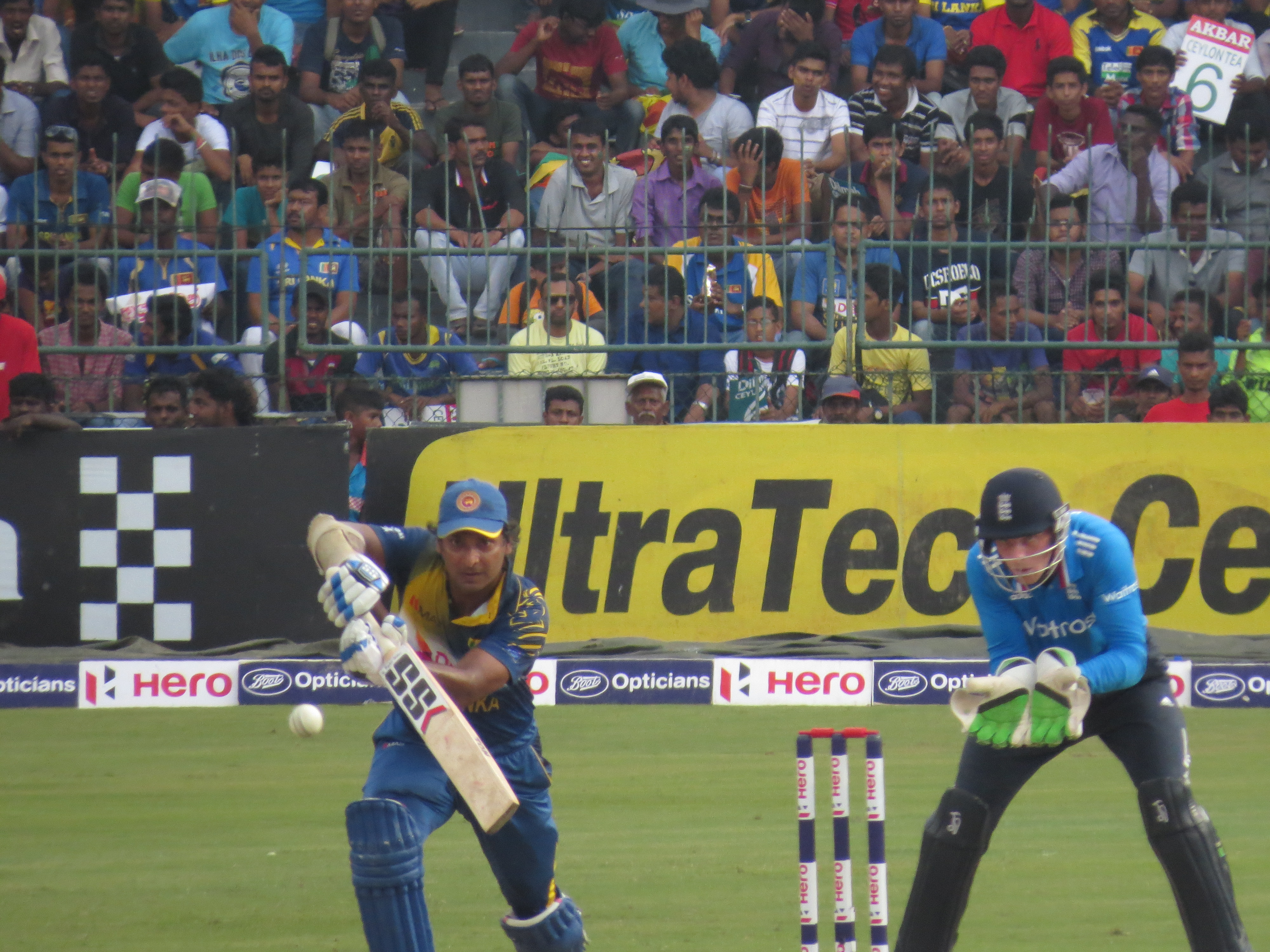
Kumara Sangakkara batting against England in 2014 at the R.Premadasa Stadium in Colombo

On 4 January 2015, Sangakkara scored his 38th test century by making 203 against New Zealand during the second match of the 2 Test match series. With this feat, he is only one short to become the highest double-century maker in test history. He has 11 test double centuries, only one short of 12 double centuries by Don Bradman. He also surpassed 12,000 runs in Test cricket, becoming the first Sri Lankan and 5th overall cricketer to achieve that mark.

On 14 February 2015, Sangakkara became the second highest run scorer in One-Day International history, by surpassing Australian Ricky Ponting. He achieved this milestone during the first match of the 2015 ICC Cricket World Cup against New Zealand, but Sri Lanka lost the match.

On 26 February 2015 in the 2015 ICC Cricket World Cup against Bangladesh, Sangakkara scored his 22nd ODI century in his 400th appearance in One-Day Internationals. The 210* second wicket partnership between Sangakkara and Tillakaratne Dilshan on that day was broken again on 1 March 2015, in the next group match in World Cup against England, where Sangakkara joined Lahiru Thirimanne with 212* for the second wicket. Sangakkara scored his 23rd century in this match and this 70-ball century was his fastest century overall and the fastest century by a Sri Lankan in World Cup history.

During the same World Cup, against Australia, when chasing a massive score of 377, Sangakkara passed 14,000 ODI runs, becoming the first Sri Lankan and second overall cricketer to pass it. He scored 124 runs in the next match against Scotland, becoming first batsman in World Cup history to score 4 consecutive hundreds.

Sangakkara's last ODI innings were disappointing from him and his teams' point of view, where Sri Lanka lost the quarter-final against South Africa on 18 March 2015. He only scored 45 runs, it was Sri Lanka's first World Cup defeat in a quarter final after 1999. His teammate Mahela also retired from ODI career with this match. He was named in the 'Team of the Tournament' for the 2015 World Cup by the ICC.

He retired from T20Is in April 2014 and from ODIs on 18 March 2015. On 27 June 2015, he officially announced his retirement from Test cricket, to be effective following the second Test against India that year. He scored 32 and 18 in his last Test match and was dismissed by Ravichandran Ashwin in both innings.

=== Statistical summary ===
Sangakkara averaged 57.40 in Test cricket and 42 in ODIs.

At the time of his retirement, Sangakkara was the second-highest ODI run-scorer after Sachin Tendulkar, and the sixth-highest Test run-scorer.

He scored 38 centuries in Test cricket, more than any other Sri Lankan batter. In addition, he scored 25 centuries in ODIs.

Sangakkara holds the record for the most wicket-keeping dismissals (482) in ODI cricket, with 383 catches and 99 stumpings. His 13,262 runs in ODIs is the record by a wicket-keeper-batter. In the history of the Cricket World Cup, Sangakkara has completed the highest number of dismissals by a wicketkeeper – 54 in 37 matches. He was the second wicket-keeper after Adam Gilchrist to complete fifty dismissals in World Cups.

== Playing style and personality ==
=== Batting ===
As a left hand batter, Sangakkara tended to play off his front foot, using the cover drive as one of his regular scoring shots. He also liked to hit the ball square of the stumps on the offside, using the cut shot. The pull to leg or onside was another natural stroke for him.

=== Wicket-keeping ===
As a wicket-keeper, Sangakkara was noted for his energy and athleticism.

=== Approach to controversy ===
Sangakkara is noted for his willingness to speak openly about controversial topics and he was chosen by Marylebone Cricket Club (MCC) to deliver the 2011 Spirit of Cricket Cowdrey Lecture at Lord's. He was both the youngest person and the first active international player to do so. His speech was widely praised by the cricketing community which welcomed Sangakkara's frank statements and outspoken style.

The one-hour-long speech focused on corruption within cricket administration in Sri Lanka. Sangakkara said:

Accountability and transparency in administration and credibility of conduct were lost in a mad power struggle that would leave Sri Lankan cricket with no clear, consistent administration.

He observed that the problems had arisen only after Sri Lanka's 1996 Cricket World Cup victory and blamed "a handful of well-meaning individuals" who control the game, wasting the finances and resources of Sri Lanka Cricket. Immediately after the lecture, the Sri Lankan sports minister Mahindananda Aluthgamage ordered an investigation into Sangakkara's allegations. Despite critical comments by officials in the Sri Lankan government, it has been described as "the most important speech in cricket history."

One of cricket's most controversial issues is so-called "sledging" and Sangakkara has won some admiration for being willing to talk about it openly. In an interview in 2004 he explained his approach to it:

The public perception of sledging is to go out there and abuse someone in obscene language, questioning their parentage or sexual preferences. That kind of abuse does not belong on the field of play. Sledging, as coined and pioneered by the Australians, is a measured comment designed to get a reaction out of a player. It could be any reaction: a bit of anger, a show of arrogance, a comment, a shake of the head, or a slump of the shoulders.

— Kumara Sangakkara in 2004

=== Tributes ===
When Sangakkara retired from international cricket, he received praise from many sources which confirmed his popularity in the sport and underlined the respect his fellow professionals have always held for him. India's captain Virat Kohli, for example, spoke of Sangakkara as "a lovely human being" who had been "a wonderful player for Sri Lanka" and someone whom "a lot of left-handers really look up to, for the way he plays". Kohli emphasised: "His technique and the way he has scored runs all over the world, his numbers speak for themselves". Angelo Mathews, Sri Lanka's captain at the time, said Sangakkara was "the 'backbone' of their team". Cricket Australia said that, his batting feats aside, Sangakkara "holds a reputation as one of the game's true gentlemen".

Matches between Nalanda College, Colombo, and Trinity College, Kandy, have been part of Sri Lanka's schools cricket calendar since 1978. Mahela Jayawardene was a student of the former and Kumar Sangakkara of the latter. In January 2019, the colleges created the Mahela-Sanga Challenge Trophy as the prize for their future matches against each other. The trophy is dedicated to "two cricketing gentlemen who have shown their willingness to contribute to society on countless occasions".

== Post-retirement ==
=== Committee work for Sri Lanka Cricket ===
Sangakkara joined Sri Lanka's international selection committee on 7 March 2016, working with chairman Aravinda de Silva and fellow selectors Romesh Kaluwitharana, Ranjith Madurasinghe, and Lalith Kaluperuma. In 2021, Sangakkara was appointed to Sri Lanka Cricket's four-man technical advisory committee panel, again working with de Silva; the other two members were Muttiah Muralitharan and Roshan Mahanama.

=== Broadcasting ===
Sangakkara has worked for Sky Sports since 2018 as a cricket commentatator. He has received much praise for the analytical aspect of his comments, which have been described as insightful.

=== MCC President ===
In January 2019, Sangakkara accepted an invitation from the incumbent President of Marylebone Cricket Club, Anthony Wreford, to be his successor. The decision was announced on 1 May 2019, at which time Sangakkara became the President-Designate. His one-year term began on 1 October 2019 and Sangakkara was the first non-British MCC President since the club was founded in 1787. He described MCC as "the greatest cricket club in the world" and said being named as its president was a "huge honour". He had been awarded honorary life membership of MCC in 2012 and had joined its World Cricket Committee the same year. He was succeeded by Clare Connor, who became MCC's first female president.

=== Coaching ===
Sangakkara is the current Director of Cricket for Rajasthan Royals in the IPL, appointed since January 2021. Under his direction, the Royals reached the 2022 IPL Final but lost by 7 wickets to Gujarat Titans. In IPL 2023, Royals finished fifth in the points table.

=== ICC Hall of Fame ===
In June 2021, Sangakkara was elected to the ICC Cricket Hall of Fame, the second Sri Lankan player after Muttiah Muralitharan to receive the honour.

=== Club cricket ===
In 2024, Sangakkara came out of retirement to play for Dorset Division 3 team Shillingstone CC. He bats at 5 after claiming he is "untested at this level".

== Personal life ==
Sangakkara met his wife, Yehali, when they were at school together; they have twin children who were born in 2009 soon after he assumed the Sri Lanka captaincy. Yehali has accompanied him on tour including nearly two months in the West Indies for the 2007 Cricket World Cup, in which Sri Lanka were the runners-up. In December 2011, Sangakkara collaborated with Mahela Jayawardene and veteran chef Dharshan Munidasa to open the Ministry of Crab which has developed into one of Colombo's most successful restaurants.

Sangakkara is a devout Buddhist. He is involved with Sri Lankan charities, mainly those which help children. He is a member of the Think Wise Initiative, which was launched by the ICC in co-operation with UNICEF and the Joint United Nations Programme on HIV/AIDS. It is aimed at raising awareness of HIV prevention and eliminating discrimination against people living with HIV and AIDS. Sangakkara is also a partner in the Foundation of Goodness, a children's charity launched by Muttiah Muralitharan in Galle.

On 19 August 2015, just after the 2015 Sri Lankan parliamentary election, President Maithripala Sirisena appointed Sangakkara as Ambassador of Anti-narcotics, a program which aims to promote awareness of and reduce dependency on dangerous drugs.

== See also ==
- List of international cricket centuries by Kumar Sangakkara

Awards and achievements
Preceded by Sachin Tendulkar	Wisden Leading Cricketer in the World; 2011	Succeeded by Michael Clarke
Sporting positions
Preceded by Mahela Jayawardene	Sri Lankan national cricket captain 2009–2011	Succeeded by Tillakaratne Dilshan
