= News Media Guild =

- News Media Guild, local 31222
- Founded: 1958
- Headquarters: New York City
- Location: United States
- Key people: Vin A. Cherwoo, president Tony Winton, administrator
- Parent organization: The NewsGuild
- Website: www.newsmediaguild.org

The News Media Guild, formerly known as the Wire Service Guild, is Local union 31222 of The NewsGuild, which is a sector of the Communications Workers of America.

Most of its members are employees of the Associated Press, where the union represents reporters, editors, photographers, broadcast staff, payroll clerks and computer technicians. It also represents employees of United Press International and the EFE news agency in the United States.

Staffers at The Guardian US joined the News Media Guild in 2015. US-based staff of British financial publisher Pageant Media joined the News Media Guild in 2020. Staff of civic tech nonprofit Democracy Works and US-based staff of Oxford University Press joined the News Media Guild in 2021.

== History ==
The national local was founded in 1958, but its roots extend back to the 1940s. Organizing workers at AP was the subject of a case before the U.S. Supreme Court in Associated Press v. Labor Board, 301 U.S. 103 (1937) which held that the First Amendment did not give media employers immunity from labor laws. That case involved an editorial worker who edited and rewrote news copy.

== See also ==
- List of NewsGuild-CWA Locals
