= Mahela-Sanga Challenge Trophy =

Nalanda College, Colombo has been playing first XI cricket with Trinity College, Kandy since 1978.

Wisden Cricketers of the Year recipients in the caliber of Mahela Jayawardene and Kumar Sangakkara were educated namely at Nalanda College, Colombo and Trinity College, Kandy. Also both Mahela and Kumar are the current holders for Test cricket partnerships (for any wicket) 624.

As a token of appreciation to those two cricketers the annual encounter between Nalanda and Trinity is played for Mahela-Sanga Trophy (Sinhala: මහේල සංගා කුසලානය) since 2019 with the theme “Spirit of Cricket Legacy for Future Generations”.

== See also ==
- මහේල සංගා කුසලානය
