= Condé Nast Entertainment =

Book-to-film media company

- Type: Division
- Founded: October 2011; 15 years ago Manhattan, New York City, United States
- Headquarters: One World Trade Center, New York City
- Number of locations: 2
- Parent: Condé Nast
- Website: Conde Nast Entertainment

Condé Nast Entertainment (CNE) is a production and distribution studio with film, television, social and online video, and virtual reality content. It is a division of Condé Nast.

CNE is headquartered at 1 World Trade Center.

== Background ==
Previously, Condé Nast (CN) magazines were represented in Hollywood by agents and received production credit and fees for films made on their work. Brokeback Mountain, A Beautiful Mind, and Eat, Pray, Love, based on an Allure article, were all films based on CN content. Also, the "Whale War" show on Animal Planet originated with a Condé Nast magazine article. On the other hand, Conde Nast's Vogue refused in 2003 to partner on Project Runway for fear of tarnishing its image. With print growth slowing, CN indicated that the company would seek other revenue in licensing, e-commerce, video, and higher circulation prices.

== History ==
Brand channel	Launched
GQ	March 2013
Glamour	March 2013
Vogue	May 2013
Wired	May 2013
Vanity Fair	July 2013
Allure	April 2014

Conde Nast Entertainment was started by magazine publisher Condé Nast in October 2011 with the hiring of Dawn Ostroff.

Online video channels for GQ and Glamour were launched in March 2013 with four original video series for each brand with Procter & Gamble, Microsoft and snack-food company Mondelēz International sponsoring those shows. Each series would have some episodes available at launch then additional episodes would be added weekly. The episodes would last from two to seven minutes and be featured on the magazines' websites and YouTube. On May 1, CNE announced at the 2nd annual Digital Content NewFronts event, an adverting selling event, two new channels for Vogue and Wired for its digital network and 30 new programs. Also, CNE agreed to syndicate their content with AOL, Yahoo, Twitter, Dailymotion, and Grab Media. Production firms Radical Media, Hud:sun Media and Magical Elves agreed to co-produce the programs. CNE's two existing channels were slated for three additional programs each. Additional channels were expected to be launched later in the year: Vanity Fair, Teen Vogue, Epicurious and Style.com.

CNE's first scripted series, Codefellas, was launched on its Wired channel. The 12 episode short-form animated series is a comedy featuring National Security Agency agents as "literally cartoonish figures engaged in ludicrous acts of domestic spying."

In July 2013, CNE made two deals: one with Discovery Communications for a Vanity Fair Confidential crime and mystery documentary series to air on Investigation Discovery channel, and the other with Ovation cable network for the Fashion Fund design contest show, a show already being shown online.

The Vanity Fair channel launched four series with ad sponsors, who were American Express, luxury brand Salvatore Ferragamo and Acura. The channel was launched in July 2013 with four programs: Vanity Code, @VFHollywood with Krista Smith, The Snob's Dictionary, and Eminent Domains.

In early April 2014, CNE launched another digital channel based on Allure. On April 29, the company announced the launch of "The Scene", a new online video platform for digital-first content, to be launched in July 2014 with content partners including ABC News, BuzzFeed, Major League Soccer, and the Weather Channel. CNE channels to be featured on The Scene would be those of The New Yorker, Lucky and Bon Appetit.

CNE agreed to its initial first-look deal in June 2014 with 20th Century Fox Television (2CFT) for its scripted television projects while 2CFT's cable arm, Fox21, would work with them for cable projects. In November 2014, the company began its move to One World Trade Center from 4 Times Square.

In January 2017, Vanity Fair's Hive business news and Condé Nast Entertainment partnered with Cheddar to create a live weekly series called VF Hive on Cheddar. Graydon Carter, a Vanity Fair editor, called the series a "representation of how people are consuming more voraciously than ever."

At the company's fifth annual Digital Content NewFronts presentation in New York in May 2017, CNE announced the return of 65 original short-form digital series and the premiere of 40 new shows. In August 2017, CNE announced its participation in Facebook's new original video programing platform, Watch, by introducing "Virtually Dating," a show where blind dates take place in a virtual reality world. Ostroff identifies Facebook Watch as "a new opportunity, new type of content."

In December 2017, CNE announced a new first-look deal that gives Paramount and Anonymous Content an opportunity to partner with CNE on production for scripted TV projects in advance of other potential collaborators.

On February 22, 2018, Condé Nast announced the launch of Iris, a video and social-led brand for socially-conscious millennial women, that was developed from the original programming on The Scene. Programming on Iris will include the series " Broken," showcasing couples confronting each other about infidelity, and "Affirmations", featuring children receiving affirmations from their parents.

In July 2018, Dawn Ostroff stepped down as President to join Spotify, and COO Sahar Elhabashi was appointed interim head.

In November 2018, Oren Katzeff joined as President.

CNE employees unionized in 2022.

== Television series ==
Name	Description
"Fastest Car" (Netflix)	Netflix dropped Condé Nast Entertainment and Large Eye's new 8 hour-long episode series "Fastest Car" on April 6, 2018. In each episode, three souped-up "sleeper" cars, tinkered with and lovingly labored on, go head to head with one of the world's most sought-after supercars. The show was renewed for a second season August 14, 2018.
"True Crime/Uncovered" (Snapchat)	On March 12, 2018, Condé Nast Entertainment premiered a new, original nonfiction series titled "True Crime/Uncovered" for Snapchat. The six-episode crime series is hosted by actress Samantha Grace Miller and utilizes diverse media sources and pieces of evidence to explore the crimes. Half of season 2 of the series was released in September 2018.
"Last Chance U" (Netflix)	Originally based on a 2014 GQ feature, "Last Chance U" unearths the unfamiliar, yet vast difference between Division I and community college football teams. This behind-the-scenes look features the 2015 season of the East Mississippi Community College football team and its tumultuous road to winning its third straight National Junior College Athletic Association championship. The third season of CNE's docuseries "Last Chance U" was released on Netflix on July 21, 2018 and the streamer quickly picked up the fourth season on August 8, 2018. The new season moves to Independence Community College in Kansas from East Mississippi Community College, where the show filmed for the first two years.
"Most Expensivest" (Viceland)	The GQ video series, "Most Expensivest," features 2 Chainz sampling the most expensivest this world can offer. This CNE digital short was picked up by Viceland as a full-length series and premiered on the cable network on November 15, 2017. The series' second season aired on July 10, 2018 and was renewed for a third season on August 20, 2018.
"The Fashion Fund" (Amazon)	Vogue and CNE's "Fashion Fund" is an annual competition show on Ovation that grooms the next generation of emerging design talent. Winners of the "Fashion Fund" are awarded a monetary prize and business mentoring.
"Vanity Fair Confidential" (Investigation Discovery)	The true-crime docuseries chronicles different unsolved cases featured in Vanity Fair. "Vanity Fair Confidential" produced the third season of this investigative show in early 2017. Season four of the series premiered on February 5, 2018, on Investigation Discovery.
"The New Yorker Presents" (Amazon)	This series brings The New Yorker to life with diverse content including animation, cartoons, scripted short films and documentaries. Available on Amazon Prime, the TV series was produced and directed by Alex Gibney.
"Gentlemen Lobsters" (Amazon)	"Gentlemen Lobsters" is an animated GQ comedy series that follows the adventures of crustaceans Garrett and Quinn. The CNE produced series won a Webby in 2016 in the "Online Film & Video: Weird" category.
"Geeks Who Drink" (Amazon)	CNE transformed the common trivia contest for pub patrons into "Geeks Who Drink," a Syfy weekly game show hosted by Zachary Levi.
"Cricket Fever: Mumbai Indians" (Netflix)	On April 7, 2018, Condé Nast Entertainment announced its new unscripted docu-series in production with Netflix that will feature the Indian Premier League champion Mumbai Indians. The eight-part series will spend time with players in the 2018 season, both on and off the field, and go deep into the cricketing values and traditions, all leading up to the IPL18 Final.

== Filmography ==
Name	Description
"Army of One" (2016)	As CNE's first feature film, "Army of One" chronicles the adventure of one man, Gary Faulkner (played by Nicolas Cage), promising to single-handedly hunt down and capture Osama bin Laden. The real-life story is based on a 2010 GQ feature of the ex-con's tumultuous journey to Pakistan in hopes of capturing Osama bin Laden.
"First Monday in May" (2016)	This fashion documentary follows Met curator Andrew Bolton and Vogue editor-in-chief Anna Wintour as they foster the creation of the 2015 Chinese-inspired Western fashion exhibit, "China: Through the Looking Glass." The film's opening night was featured in TriBeCa's 2016 festival.
"Only the Brave" (2017)	This film features the true story of the 19 firefighters, known as the Granite Mountain Hotshots, who lost their lives trying to control one of the deadliest wildfires in U.S. history near Yarnell, Arizona. "Only the Brave" moved from Lionsgate to Sony has an October 20 release date. The film is based on a 2013 GQ article.
"The Old Man & The Gun"	"The Old Man & The Gun" tells the unconventional tale of Forrest Tucker, played by Robert Redford, who at 70 escaped from San Quentin State Prison and committed a series of crimes. Casey Affleck plays the captivated detective who is obsessed with catching Tucker. The film is based on a 2003 New Yorker short story by David Grann. The film will be released by Fox Searchlight on September 28, 2018.
"The Great Chinese Art Heist"	On February 25, 2021, Jon M. Chu was set to direct and produce the film adaptation of The Great Chinese Art Heist, about a slew of museum art robberies that occurred in Europe, in which Chinese antiquities were stolen, chiefly those that came from the country’s old Summer Palace which was raided in 1860 by French soldiers, with Chu’s Electric Somewhere producing the film with Lance Johnson, Agnes Chu, Will Welch, & GQ’s Geneva Waserman for Warner Bros. Pictures to distribute. "The Great Chinese Art Heist" is based on a true story first published in Condé Nast's GQ by Alex W. Palmer.
"King of the Jungle"	At Cannes 2017, CNE and its partners announced that Johnny Depp is set to star in "King of the Jungle," a dark comedy to be directed by Glenn Ficarra and John Requa from a script by Golden Globe® and Emmy Award® winners Scott Alexander and Larry Karaszewski. "King of the Jungle" is based on a true story first published in Condé Nast's WIRED by Joshua Davis. The film is expected to go into production in 2018.
"This Above All"	"This Above All" is based on the true-life story of Megan Phelps-Roper, a former member of the Westboro Baptist Church. The film is adapted from both an article written by Adrian Chen for Condé Nast's The New Yorker and from Phelps-Roper's soon-to-be-published autobiography. Marc Webb will direct and Nick Hornby will write the upcoming feature film. In addition to CNE, Reese Witherspoon and Bruna Papandrea from Made Up Stories will produce the film.
"Relive Box"	CNE is developing the feature film "Relive Box," based on a fictionalized short story in The New Yorker about a tech device that allows you to relive your past.
Untitled	CNE acquired the life rights from photographer David Slater to make a film related to the monkey selfie copyright dispute.

== Acquisitions ==
Name	Description
"Knife Skills" (2018)	In February 2018, CNE acquired Oscar-nominated short documentary "Knife Skills" for The New Yorker's "The Screening Room," which features award-winning short films. The film is directed by Thomas Lennon ("The Blood of Yingzhou District") and follows the launch of an haute cuisine restaurant in Cleveland staffed by men and women recently released from prison.
"House of Z" (2017)	"House of Z" recounts the exponential rise of fashion designer Zac Posen at the young age of 21and the sudden fall of his brand years later. The documentary then chronicles Posen's challenging journey of rebuilding his company in the critical fashion industry. This is Condé Nast Entertainment's first full-length feature film acquisition.
"The New Yorker: 5 Films about Technology" (2017)	This compilation of short stories features five relatable anecdotes commenting on modern-day's social relationship with technology. Peter Huang, the director, claims that he "really want[ed] to talk about" this "very strange time in human history".
"Joe's Violin" (2016)	In partnership with brand The New Yorker, Condé Nast Entertainment acquired "Joe's Violin", a documentary about an unconventional pair brought together through a donated violin. 91-year-old Holocaust survivor Joe Feingold's beloved instrument ends up in the hands of 12-year-old Brianna Perez, who quickly find solace in making music. "Joe's Violin" was nominated for a Documentary Short Subject Academy Award in 2017.
"Bacon & God's Wrath" (2016)	This documentary created by Sol Friedman chronicles the journey of a 90-year-old woman named Razie, who recently became atheist and reflects on her religious upbringing. "Bacon & God's Wrath" was the winner of the Short Film Jury Award at the 2016 Sundance Film Festival.
"Dollhouse" (2016)	The documentary is directed by Terri Timely and profiles Kate Charles, who creates lifelike dolls by specializing in "reborns." The short film received Special Jury Recognition at the 2016 SXSW conference.
"Pink Boy" (2016)	CNE and Vanity Fair acquired "Pink Boy," a short documentary about a sensitive and endearing gender non-conforming boy and his lesbian mother who loves and protects him. "Pink Boy" won a 2017 People's Voice Webby for "Documentary: Individual Episode."
"{The And}" 2015	This interactive documentary explores the intimate spaces of modern-day relationships, and won an Emmy in 2015. This series is created by The Skin Deep, a creative studio that specializes on human connection in the digital age.

== Incubators ==
CNE is a production and distribution partner of three incubators.

"The Big Script" incubator was formed by "Hunger Games" star Josh Hutcherson and it produced five short films from young filmmakers via Black List submitted scripts. It is in partnership with Indigenous Media and The Scene houses the five "The Big Script" episodes.

CNE and Indigenous Media also produced "Project: HER," a mentoring initiative for female writers and directors. The incubator officially launched on March 28, 2018 and showcased 6 films by diverse female filmmakers mentored by "Homeland" director Lesli Linka Glatter, "The Affair" showrunner Sarah Treem, "Eves Bayou" director Kasi Lemmons, "Private Parts" director Betty Thomas and Indigenous Media co-founder Rodrigo Garcia. The films are housed on CNE's The Scene and d the Project HER Facebook show page.

"Creators in Residence" is a program designed to support millennial filmmakers.

== Awards ==
CNE has won several awards. The company received an Academy Award® nomination for the short documentary "Joe's Violin," as well as nominations for a Critics' Choice Award and a Peabody Award in the Documentary category for the Netflix series "Last Chance U." In 2018, CNE also received 3 News & Documentary Emmy nominations for Glamour's "Angelique" and The New Yorker's "The Black Athlete in America" with The RetroReport and "We Are Witnesses" with The Marshall Project.

Previously, CNE won a BAFTA for Live Action Short for "Boogaloo and Graham," an Emmy for Glamour's "Screw Cancer," and a Producers Guild Award for Outstanding Digital Series for Wired's "What's Inside."
