= Condé Nast union =

Labor union formed in 2022

Condé Nast Union represents employees of the mass media company Condé Nast, who organized as a labor union in 2022.

== History ==
Several publications owned by Condé Nast had organized into unions starting in 2018: Ars Technica (March 2019), The New Yorker (June 2018), Pitchfork (March 2019), and Wired (April 2020). Employees at other Condé Nast publications announced their union drive in March 2022 with a letter to management requesting voluntary recognition.

After a card check in which approximately 80% of eligible employees submitted union cards, indicating their interest in organizing as a union, Condé Nast voluntarily recognized the union in September 2022 without requiring an election held by the National Labor Relations Board (NLRB). The union covers editorial, production, and video employees at Condé Nast publications which had not previously unionized, including Vanity Fair, Allure, Architectural Digest, Bon Appétit, and the in-house production team of Condé Nast Entertainment. The four publications owned by Condé Nast which had organized prior to the recognition of Condé Nast Union retained their separate unions.

On November 1, 2023, Condé Nast CEO Roger Lynch announced 5% of its workforce, estimated at 270 to more than 300 employees, would be laid off, amid negotiations for its first contract with Condé Nast Union. Since 94 unionized employees were targeted as part of those layoff plans, the terms of their layoffs were subject to collective bargaining. The union filed two complaints with the NLRB regarding unfair practices during subsequent negotiations: one in December, alleging surveillance and intimidation after union representatives attempted to get more information regarding layoffs; and another in January, claiming that Condé Nast was acting in bad faith as the company halved its initial severance package after a union counteroffer. As a result, the union announced a 24-hour walk out, which took place on January 23, 2024, the day when Oscar Award nominations were announced. In solidarity, SAG-AFTRA member Anne Hathaway walked out of a scheduled photo shoot with Vanity Fair that day.

On May 6, 2024, Condé Nast Union announced they had reached a tentative agreement with management hours before the union was set to go on strike; the union had been planning to picket the Met Gala later that day.

== List of organizations represented ==
- Allure
- Architectural Digest
- Bon Appétit
- Condé Nast Traveler
- Epicurious
- Glamour
- GQ
- Self
- Teen Vogue
- Them
- Vanity Fair
- Vogue
- Condé Nast Entertainment

== See also ==
- The New Yorker Union
