= The New Yorker Union =

Labor union

The New Yorker Union formed in 2018 as the first labor union in the magazine's history. Its bargaining unit includes editorial workers, such as copy editors and fact checkers, but not staff writers.

Condé Nast and the union produced an agreement in June 2021 after two years of bargaining. The agreement increased the lowest base salaries from $42,000 to $60,000. Wages for many employees will increase 10% or more. Worker protections include health care cost limits, clear working hours, and requires documentation for firing employees. The agreement also covered Condé Nast's Ars Technica and Pitchfork publications. In the weeks before the final agreement, workers protested at Condé Nast figure Anna Wintour's home and the union had threatened a strike.

The New Yorker Union remains distinct from the company-wide Condé Nast union recognized in mid-2022.
