= Mahela Jayawardene =

Sri Lankan cricketer

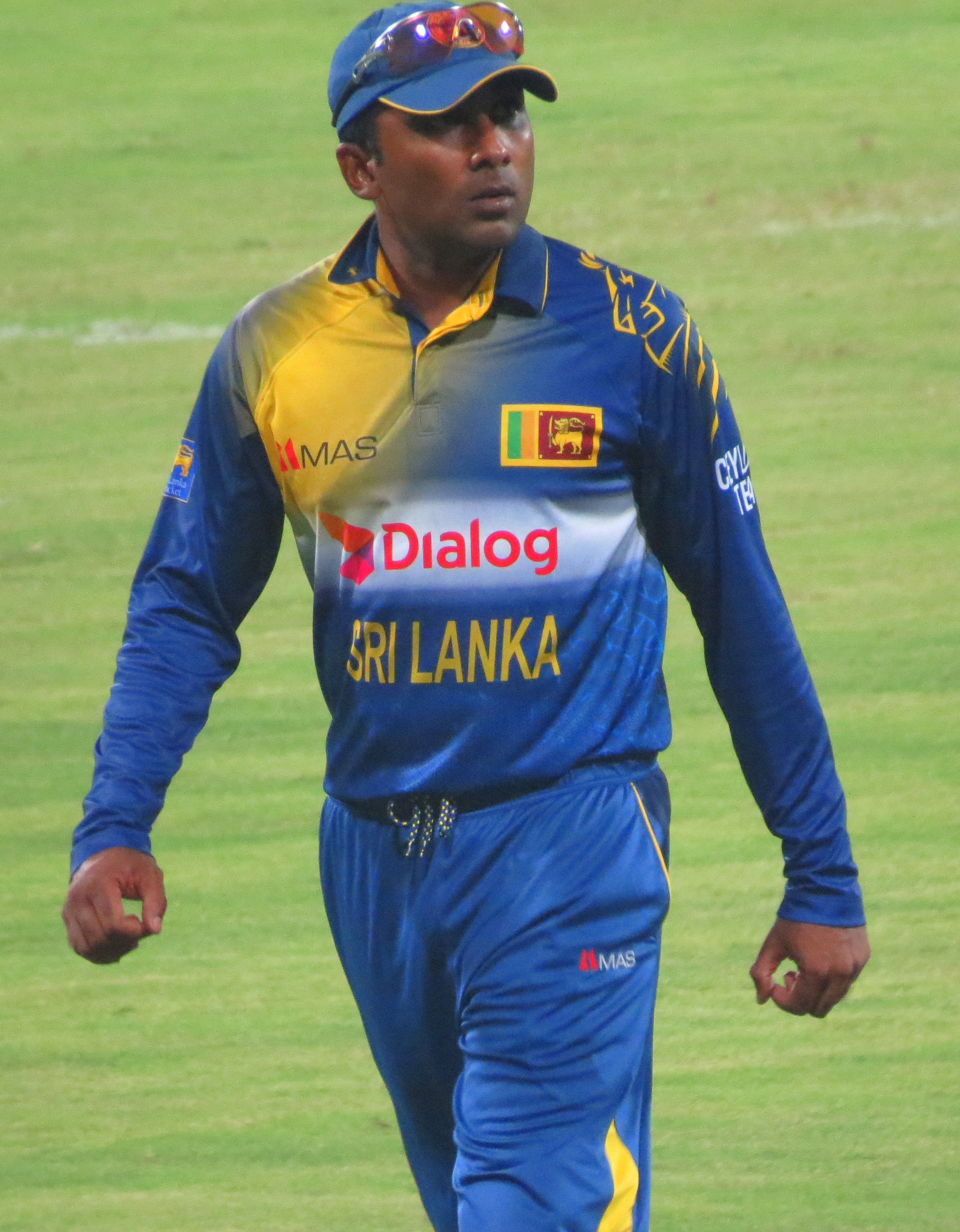
- Jayawardene playing for Sri Lanka in 2014

Personal information
- Full name: Denagamage Proboth Mahela de Silva Jayawardene
- Born: 27 May 1977 (age 49); Colombo, Sri Lanka
- Nickname: Maiya, Master Mind
- Height: 5 ft 6 in (1.68 m)
- Batting: Right-handed
- Bowling: Right-arm medium
- Role: Batsman

International information
- National side: Sri Lanka (1997–2015)
- Test debut (cap 69): 2 August 1997 v India
- Last Test: 14 August 2014 v Pakistan
- ODI debut (cap 92): 24 January 1998 v Zimbabwe
- Last ODI: 18 March 2015 v South Africa
- ODI shirt no.: 27
- T20I debut (cap 5): 15 June 2006 v England
- Last T20I: 6 April 2014 v India
- T20I shirt no.: 27

Domestic team information
- Years: Team
- 1996/97–2014/15: Sinhalese Sports Club
- 2007/08–2012: Wayamba Elevens
- 2008–2010: Kings XI Punjab (squad no. 27)
- 2011: Kochi Tuskers Kerala (squad no. 27)
- 2012–2013: Delhi Daredevils (squad no. 27)
- 2013: Trinidad and Tobago Red Steel
- 2015: Sussex
- 2015: Jamaica Tallawahs
- 2015/16–2016/17: Central Districts
- 2015/16: Adelaide Strikers
- 2016: Somerset
- 2016/17: Dhaka Dynamites
- 2017: Karachi Kings

Head coaching information
- Years: Team
- 2025–2026: Mumbai Indians

Career statistics
Competition	Test	ODI	FC	LA
Matches	149	448	237	546
Runs scored	11,814	12,650	17,838	15,421
Batting average	49.84	33.37	49.68	33.67
100s/50s	34/50	19/77	51/80	21/95
Top score	374	144	374	163*
Balls bowled	589	593	3,001	1,280
Wickets	6	8	52	24
Bowling average	51.66	70.37	31.32	47.75
5 wickets in innings	0	0	1	0
10 wickets in match	0	0	0	0
Best bowling	2/32	2/56	5/72	3/25
Catches/stumpings	205/–	218/–	305/–	265/–
Medal record
Men's Cricket
Representing Sri Lanka
ICC Cricket World Cup
Runner-up	2007 West Indies
Runner-up	2011 India–Bangladesh–Sri Lanka
ICC T20 World Cup
Winner	2014 Bangladesh
Runner-up	2009 England
Runner-up	2012 Sri Lanka
ICC Champions Trophy
Winner	2002 Sri Lanka
Asia Cup
Winner	2014 Asia Cup
Winner	2008 Asia Cup
Winner	2004 Asia Cup
Runner-up	2010 Asia Cup
Runner-up	2000 Asia Cup
- Source: ESPNcricinfo, 17 August 2016

Denagamage Praboth Mahela de Silva Jayawardene (Sinhala: දෙනගමගේ ප්‍රබෝත් මහේල ද සිල්වා ජයවර්ධන; born 27 May 1977) is a Sri Lankan former professional cricketer, captain, and batsman of the Sri Lankan national cricket team.

During the time of his captaincy Jayawardene led his national team to be the winners of the 2008 Asia Cup. Jayawardene was the first Sri Lankan in the history of the ICC Men's T20 World Cup to score a century which he did with his 100 runs against Zimbabwe in the 2010 tournament.

He made his Test cricket debut in August 1997 and his One Day International (ODI) debut the following season in January 1998. In 2006 along with his teammate Kumar Sangakkara, Jayawardene made the highest ever partnership in First-class cricket, scoring 624 runs for the third wicket in the first test match of Sri Lanka's home series against South Africa. He appeared in 652 international matches representing Sri Lanka in a career spanning for about 18 years. During his international career, he also formed a friendship and healthy rivalry with Sangakkara.

Mahela is the first player in the history of Sri Lankan cricket to score over 10,000 Test runs and is also the second Sri Lankan player to score more than 10,000 runs in ODIs after Sanath Jayasuriya. Mahela Jayawardene currently serves as the Chairman of Sri Lanka National Sports Council.

Jayawardene's highest test score, 374 against South Africa, is the highest score by a right-handed batsman in the history of Test cricket. Along with teammate Sangakkara, he has the most career partnership runs for the 3rd wicket in Tests, scoring 5890 runs surpassing the 5826 run record of Rahul Dravid and Sachin Tendulkar.

Jayawardene was a key member of the team that won the 2014 ICC World Twenty20, the 2002 ICC Champions Trophy, and was part of the team that made to the final of 2007 Cricket World Cup, 2011 Cricket World Cup, 2009 ICC World Twenty20 and 2012 ICC World Twenty20.

In 2006, Jayawardene was named by the International Cricket Council as the best International captain of the year and was nominated in 2007 as the best Test cricket player of the year. He is also known for his fielding skills in the inner ring, with a report prepared by ESPNcricinfo in late 2005 showing that since the 1999 Cricket World Cup, he had effected the most run-outs in ODI cricket of any fielder, with the fifth highest run-out/match ratio in ODI's.

Jayawardene also worked as an international TV commentator in the first test at Headingley on 19 May 2016 between England and Sri Lanka.

He also serves as a board member in several unlisted public limited companies in Sri Lanka. He has been a vocal critic of Sri Lanka Cricket over the years especially after 2015 where the national team has suffered a significant decline.

In November 2021, he was inducted to the ICC Cricket Hall of Fame. He became only the third Sri Lankan to be inducted to the ICC Cricket Hall of Fame after Muttiah Muralitharan and Kumar Sangakkara.

== Career ==
=== Early and domestic career ===
Jayawardene was educated at Nalanda College Colombo. At an early age Mahela's father, Senerath Jayawardene, introduced him to the Lionel Coaching Clinic run by Nondescripts Cricket Club in Cinnamon Gardens. It was there that he learned to play cricket. He was a fast bowler initially during his school days and later transformed as a top order batsman. Jayawardene captained Nalanda College Colombo first XI cricket team in 1994. He developed his talents through the school cricket team, eventually becoming captain. He was runner-up for the best schoolboy cricketer award during the 1994 cricketing season.

Domestically he has played for Sinhalese Sports Club since 1995. He made his Twenty20 debut on 17 August 2004, for Sinhalese Sports Club in the 2004 SLC Twenty20 Tournament. He was signed to play as an overseas player for Derbyshire for the first half of the 2008 English cricket season. However, his commitments to Sri Lanka and involvement in the Indian Premier League prevented him from playing any part in the 2008 county season.

== International career ==
=== Career in the 1990s ===
Mahela Jayawardene is the 69th Sri Lanka Test Cap, having made his debut against India at Colombo in 1997. Jayawardene made his Test debut in the record breaking Test in 1997 against India at R.P.S., Colombo. Jayawardene added 66 to Sri Lanka's first innings score of 952/6, the highest Test score ever. He was at the crease when the previous highest Test score was surpassed. Early in his career he scored 167 against New Zealand and 242 against India.

Jayawardene's One Day International debut was against Zimbabwe at Premadasa in January 1998. Sri Lanka won the match, with Jayawardene hitting the winning run. In the next game Jayawardene scored 74. It took only 11 matches before he scored his first century, which was against England in the Carlton and United World Series game at Adelaide. Jayawardene entered a pressure situation, with Sri Lanka struggling at 134/4 in the run chase, but made an innings of 120 runs to win the match. The match is notable for Ross Emerson's no-balling of Muttiah Muralitharan for throwing, which led the Sri Lankan captain Arjuna Ranatunga to lead his team to the edge of the field and consider walking out of the match, as well as physical shoulder-barging by some players.

=== Captaincy ===
Jayawardene was the captain of the Sri Lankan national team during the England tour in 2006 in the absence of Marvan Atapattu. He led his team to 1–1 draw in the Test series and an emphatic 5–0 whitewash in the ODI series.

Jayawardene's results in international matches
	Matches	Won	Lost	Drawn	Tied	No result
Test	149	58	46	45	0	–
ODI	448	241	186	–	3	17
T20I	55	37	17	–	1	–

In the first Test of the 2006 Test series against South Africa, Jayawardene shared a world record partnership of 624 runs alongside Kumar Sangakkara. This partnership, the highest for any wicket in first-class cricket history, and the first instance of a stand of 600 or more in a first-class or Test match innings, smashed the previous third wicket stand for Sri Lanka, surpassing 262 which involved himself along with Thilan Samaraweera. It also broke the previous record for the third wicket partnership for all Test playing nations surpassing the 467 run partnership made by the New Zealanders Martin Crowe and Andrew Jones. During this innings, Jayawardene became the first Sri Lankan captain to score a Test triple-century, making 374 off 572 deliveries with 43 fours and 1 six, the fourth highest individual innings score in Test match cricket and the highest by a right-hander. He is also the first batsman to pass 350 in a Test without going on to break the world record. He also surpassed the highest score by a Sri Lankan in a Test match, previously held by Sanath Jayasuriya's 340 in 1997 against India, coincidentally also produced in a world record partnership.

For his performances in 2006, he was named as captain of the World ODI XI by the ICC. He was also named in the World ODI XI by ESPNcricinfo for 2007.

He was also chosen as a Wisden Cricketer of the Year in 2007. In the 2007 Cricket World Cup, Jayawardene scored one century and four half-centuries and was the second highest run-scorer of the tournament, which was topped by Australia's Matthew Hayden. The century he scored against New Zealand helped Sri Lanka win the Semi-Final. Sri Lanka finished runners-up in the World Cup losing to Australia in the final. His knock was named as the third-best ODI Batting Performance of the year by ESPNcricinfo. He is the only batsman in World Cup ODI history to score hundreds in both a semi final and a final of the tournament. He achieved this feat, by scoring a century in 2007 Cricket World Cup semi final against New Zealand, and a century in 2011 Cricket World Cup final against India. He was named in the 'Team of the Tournament' by ESPNcricinfo for the 2007 World Cup.

He has scored centuries against all Test-playing nations. He achieved this feat on 21 February 2009 by scoring his maiden Test century against Pakistan at the National Stadium in Karachi, Pakistan.

Jayawardene is the recipient of International Cricket Council's "Captain of the Year 2006", Captain of the "World One-Day International Team of the Year 2006", Wisden Cricketer of the Year 2007, and the record holder for the highest score (374 runs) by a Sri Lankan in Test cricket. He also led Sri Lanka when the team won the "Spirit of Cricket Award" in 2007 and 2008. For his performances in 2008, he was named in the World Test XI by ICC.

Jayawardene led Sri Lanka to Pakistan for a Test series in March–April 2009. The series was conducted after the Indian team withdrew from playing in Pakistan, following the 2008 Mumbai attacks. The first Test ended in a draw, even though he scored a double century in the first Test. Sri Lanka was in a good position in the Test with Thilan Samaraweera hitting his second successive double hundred of the series and Tillakaratne Dilshan scoring a century.

On their way to the Gaddafi Stadium for the third day's play, the bus that carried the Sri Lankan players was fired at by 12 masked gunmen. Jayawardene, along with six other Sri Lankan cricketers, sustained injuries. Six policemen who guarded the bus and two civilians were killed in the attack.

Jayawardene was appointed vice-captain of the Sri Lankan team once again under Kumar Sangakkara after Muttiah Muralitharan retired from Test cricket, but resigned after the team's World Cup defeat. He was appointed as captain again after Tillakaratne Dilshan resigned from the captaincy in 2012. He was the captain of Kochi Tuskers Kerala in the Indian Premier League and the Delhi Daredevils. He won the Spirit of Cricket Award 2013.

=== Post-captaincy ===
However, he regained some form during the IPL 2010. Before starting their chase of 201 runs against Kolkata Knight Riders, Jayawardene expressed his desire to open the innings to captain Kumar Sangakkara. Sangakkara agreed to his fellow countrymate and Jayawardene scored a blazing 110* off just 59 balls winning them the match in the second last over. Sangakkara, impressed by his teammate set him as opener for the Kings XI Punjab. He scored a few more entertaining knocks in vain including 44 against the Rajasthan Royals and 93* against the Deccan Chargers. He ended the tournament with a batting average of 43.90. He was the 6th highest run scorer for the tournament and highest for the Kings XI Punjab.

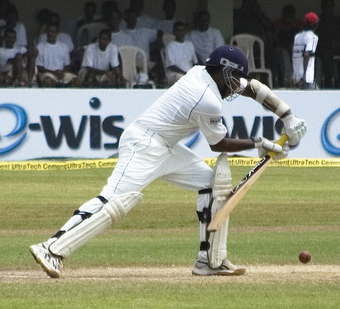
Jayawardene batting in a Test match for Sri Lanka in 2008

With Kumar Sangakkara as the Sri Lankan captain too, Jaywardene was sent as opener for the 2010 ICC World Twenty20. In the first match against New Zealand, he scored 81 off just 51 balls. However, this knock went in vain due to the collapse in the Sri Lankan batting line-up after his wicket fell which resulted in a total of only 135 on board batting first. However, in his very next match against Zimbabwe, he scored 100 off just 64 balls helping them win the match helping them win the match defending a total of 173. He thus became the 4th player to score a century in an Twenty20 International match and the first Sri Lankan to do so. Sri Lanka won the match by D/L method. In the very next match against West Indies, he scored 98* off just 56 balls narrowly missing his second century in a row. This became his third consecutive score above 80.

He was named in the 'Team of the Tournament' for the 2011 World Cup by the ICC.

His knock of 103* against India in the 2011 World Cup Final at Mumbai was nominated to be one of the best ODI batting performance of the year by ESPNcricinfo. For his performances in 2011, he was named in the World ODI XI by the ESPNcricinfo.

During the second Test of Sri Lanka's tour of South Africa in 2011–12, Jayawardene became the ninth player in cricket history, and the first Sri Lankan, to score 10,000 Test runs. At the end of the tour he was reappointed as Sri Lanka's captain, following the resignation of Tillakaratne Dilshan.

His knock of 180 against England at Galle was also nominated to be one of the best Test batting performance of the year 2012 by ESPNcricinfo.

Jayawardene led Sri Lanka to the final of the 2012 ICC World Twenty20 against the West Indies on home turf. Having restricted the West Indies to 137/6, Sri Lanka were steadily making progress in chasing down the target with Jayawardene well set. Halfway through their innings, captain Jayawardene noticed that the West Indies were slightly ahead on Duckworth/Lewis with a hint of rain in the air. He subsequently decided to accelerate the innings, but this only triggered a collapse. The rain never came and Sri Lanka fell a long way short of the target. He resigned as Sri Lanka's T20 captain after the match and in 2014 also announced his retirement from T20 cricket. He was selected in the 2nd XI of the 2014 ICC World T20 Cup by ESPNcricinfo.

He was named as captain of the 'Team of the Tournament' for the 2012 T20 World Cup by the ICC.

He holds the record for the most catches in ODIs, taking 218 catches in 448 matches.

He also holds the record for the most runs in Twenty20 World Cups having scored 858 runs in 25 innings, at an average of 40.8 runs per inning, in the four ICC World Twenty20 tournaments held to date (2007, 2009, 2010 and 2012).

On 31 March 2016, it was announced that Jayawaradene has signed for Somerset County Cricket to represent them in the English T20 league.

=== Retirement ===
On 14 July 2014, Jayawardene announced his retirement from Test cricket after the 2014 Pakistan series. He played his final Test at his favourite ground, the Sinhalese Sports Club, where he scored 54 runs in his last test innings. The ground was replete with thousands of tributes. Russell Arnold quipped that Legends never retire.

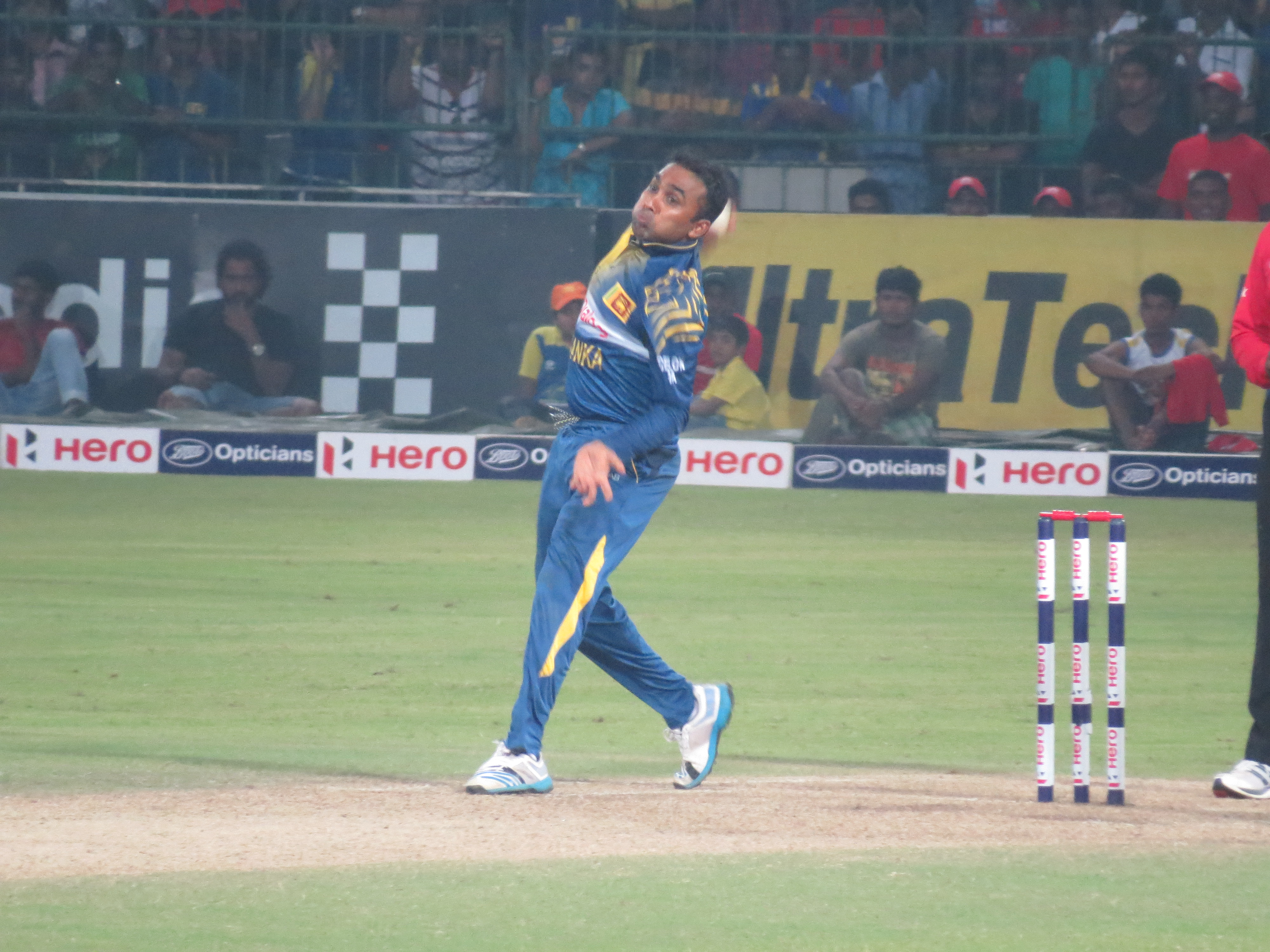
Jayawardene bowling vs England in his final ODI in Sri Lanka

His last One-Day innings in Sri Lanka was played on 13 December 2014 in the last match of England ODI series. He was caught on 28 in his last innings on home soil. Sri Lankan skipper Angelo Mathews gave him the ball to take the final wicket. He got his 8th ODI wicket by dismissing James Tredwell through a stumping, with Sangakkara behind the stumps. He along with Sangakkara announced that they would retire from T20I cricket after the 2014 ICC T20 World Cup and was eventually part of Sri Lanka's triumph at the 2014 T20 World Cup which was also Sri Lanka's first ICC World Twenty20 title.

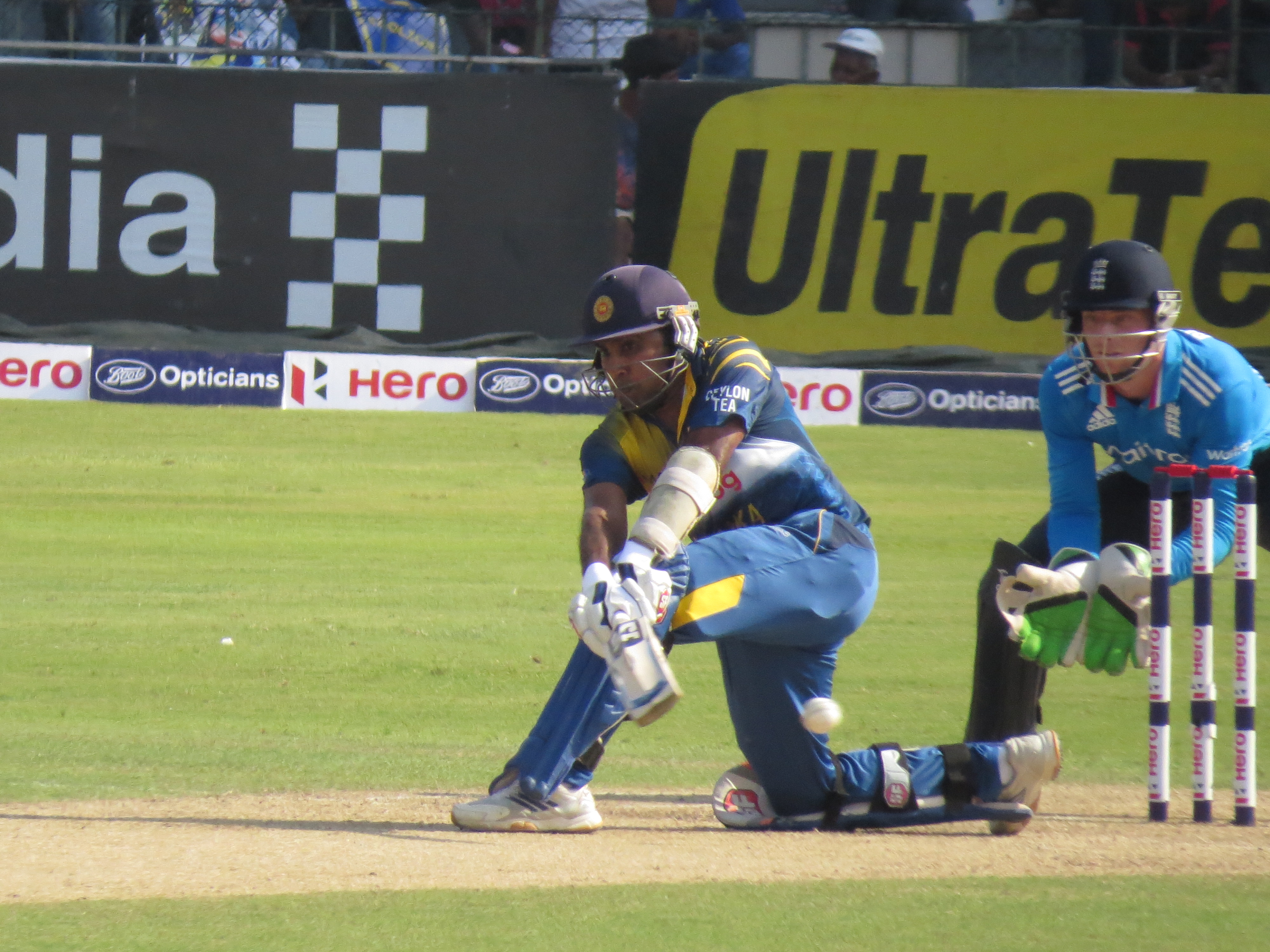
Jayawardene batting vs England in his final ODI in Sri Lanka

On 11 January 2015, he scored his 18th ODI century against New Zealand. This was his first ODI century in New Zealand in his 17-year-long ODI career.

During a match against Australia at the 2015 ICC Cricket World Cup, Jayawardene became the most capped player for Sri Lanka in ODIs, passing Jayasuriya's 445 ODI matches.

Jayawardene's last ODI was the quarter final of the 2015 World Cup, played against South Africa. He only scored 4 runs and Sri Lanka failed to qualify for the semi-finals for the first time since 1999.

== Personal life ==
Jayawardene was born to Sunila and Senerath Jayawardene at Colombo in 1977. He had one younger brother, Dhishal, who died of a brain tumour, aged 16. This affected Jayawardene psychologically, halting his cricket career for some time. Eventually he was persuaded to go on and set about rebuilding his career by his parents and teammates.

Jayawardene was married to Christina Mallika Sirisena, a travel consultant. They have one daughter, Sansa Arya Jayawardene. They divorced in 2018. Jayawardena later married Natasha Makalanda in 2021.

== Charity works ==
Off the field, he has earned praise for his personal contribution to the HOPE cancer project. With memories of his deceased brother in mind, he became the leading campaigner of HOPE. With the support of his teammates, he aims to build a new 750-bed cancer unit at Maharagama, the country's only dedicated cancer hospital.

The first cancer Trail was walked in 2011, but due to cricket tours, he couldn't participate to the walk. The walk began in the South and ended in the North with US$2.6 million, with the contribution of 30,000 people walked in the Trail. With the money, government build a 120-bed Tellippalai Trail Cancer Hospital in Jaffna.

In 2016, Jayawardene accompany with Sangakkara started a charity walkathon called Trail as One for raising money for a cancer hospital, which was the second trail after 2011. The walk started on 6 October 2016 from Point Pedro and finished at Dondra Head on 2 November 2016, which was 28-days 670 kilometres walk. Many other former and current Sri Lankan cricketers joined by each destination to the walk and the walk ended successfully with around US$5 million of money from all over the country. The money was given to expand the Karapitiya Teaching Hospital oncology unit in Galle.

== Coaching career ==
In August 2015, the England Cricket Board signed Jayawardene as batting consultant for the England team. He accepted the role and he was a part of the England coaching team travelling to the UAE for the series against Pakistan in October, up to the World Twenty20 in India.

Mahela Jayawardene was appointed as the coach of the Mumbai Indians team replacing Ricky Ponting for the 10th edition of the Indian Premier League in 2017. Mumbai Indians won the 2017 Indian Premier League on 21 May 2017 beating Rising Pune Supergiant at Rajiv Gandhi International Cricket Stadium, Hyderabad. He helped Mumbai Indians repeat the feat in 2019 and 2020, becoming only the second team ever to defend the trophy.

On 26 May 2017, he was appointed as the head coach of Bangladesh Premier League franchise Khulna Titans on a two-year contract replacing Stuart Law who took up duties as the head coach of West Indies cricket team. In 2019, he was appointed as the head coach of Southampton team for the inaugural edition of The Hundred.

In July 2021, he was appointed as the consultant of Sri Lanka national under-19 cricket team as a part of the 2022 Under-19 Cricket World Cup preparations and he insisted that he would be working as consultant for free of charge.

In October 2021, he served as a consultant coach of Sri Lankan national team and was part of the support staff during the first round of the 2021 ICC Men's T20 World Cup. However, he opted to stay only for the first round of the ICC Men's T20 World Cup in the UAE mainly due to the bio-bubble fatigue and for personal reasons. He admitted that it was difficult as a father to not see his daughter for 135 days due to staying in quarantines and bubbles since June 2021. During his brief stint with the team during the World Cup, he was understood to have raised the standards of the players as well as the level of data analysis utilized by the team.

He was appointed by Sri Lanka Cricket as the consultant coach of Sri Lanka men's national cricket team, Sri Lanka national U19 cricket team as well as the Sri Lanka A cricket team starting with immediate effect from 1 January 2022 for a time period of one year. His coaching stint would be split in order to make room for his coaching stints in franchise cricket for Mumbai Indians in the IPL and for Southern Brave in The Hundred. During his one-year deal as consultant coach of Sri Lanka national team, he would provide strategic support for players and management teams at SLC's high performance centre.

== Business ==
In July 2021, he joined the board of Janashakthi Insurance PLC after accepting an invitation and it also marked the first instance for Mahela to have joined a listed company. He was appointed as the non executive/independent director of Janashakthi Insurance.

== Product and brand endorsements ==
- Mobitel (Sri Lanka)
- DSI holdings Ltd.
- Reebok -

== Credits ==
=== Television ===
Year	Title	Role	Notes
2019	Cricket Fever: Mumbai Indians	Himself	Netflix documentary

== Player statistics ==
=== Career performance ===
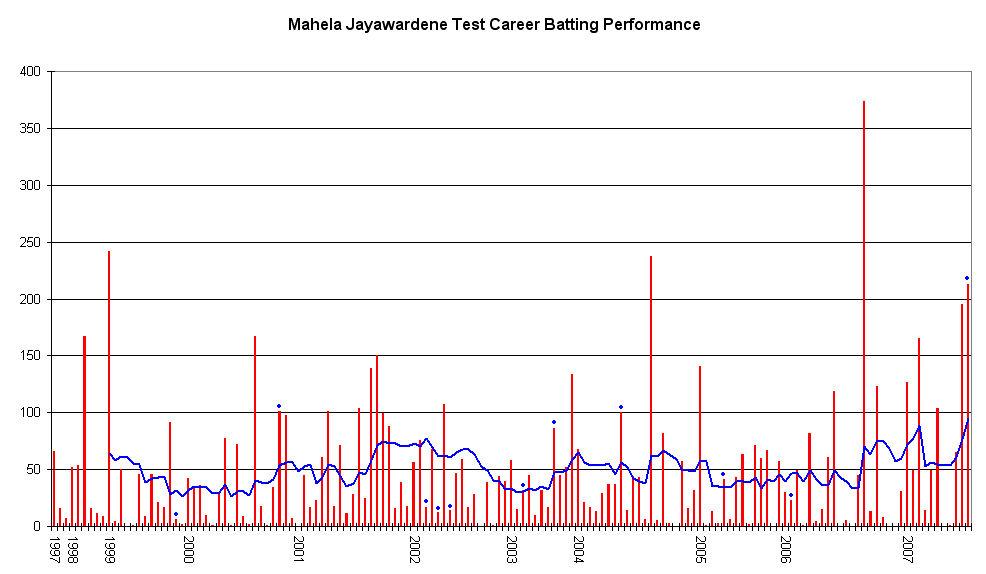
An innings-by-innings breakdown of Jayawardene's Test match batting career, showing runs scored (red bars) and the average of the last ten innings (blue line)

=== Centuries ===
Jayawardene has 34 test, 19 ODI and 1 T20I centuries. He is the first Sri Lankan and third overall to score hundreds in all forms of the game.

== Honours ==
- ICC Captain of the Year 2006
- Wisden Cricketer of the Year 2007
- ICC Spirit of Cricket Award 2013
- ICC Hall of Fame 2021

== International records ==
Tests

- Highest partnership for any wicket – 624 for the third wicket with Kumar Sangakkara against South Africa in 2006.
- Highest partnership for the fourth wicket – 437 with Thilan Samaraweera against Pakistan in 2009. Second highest for the fourth wicket of all time.
- Highest partnership for the sixth wicket – 351 with Prasanna Jayawardene
- Highest partnership for the eighth wicket – 170 with Chaminda Vaas against South Africa in 2004.
- "c Jayawardene b Muralitharan" is the most common bowler-fielder combination in the history of Test cricket (77).
- Highest individual score in Tests by a Sri Lankan – 374 runs against South Africa in 2006.
- Highest test score by a visiting batsman in India - 275 runs at Ahmedabad in 2009.
- Most test catches for Sri Lanka. 205 - Second most for any fielder in test history.

One-Day Internationals

- Most number of ODI matches for Sri Lanka – 448 matches
- Most number of catches – 218 catches in 448 matches. The only fielder in ODI history to take 200 ODI catches.
- Highest partnership for third wicket – 226 with Marvan Atapattu India in 2000.
- Highest partnership for seventh wicket – 126 with Upul Chandana against India in 2005.
- Only batsman to score centuries both in a world cup final and a world cup semifinal.

Twenty20 Internationals

- The first Sri Lankan to score a T20 international century.
- Only Sri Lankan to have scored a century in T20 World Cups.

== See also ==
- Mahela-Sanga Challenge Trophy

Preceded by Tillakaratne Dilshan	Sri Lankan national cricket captain 2012–2013	Succeeded by Angelo Mathews
Preceded by Marvan Atapattu	Sri Lankan national cricket captain 2006–2009	Succeeded by Kumar Sangakkara
