= Wine cocktail =

Mixed drink made predominantly with wine

A wine cocktail is a mixed drink, similar to a true cocktail. It is made predominantly with wine (including Champagne and Prosecco), into which distilled alcohol or other drink mixer is combined. A spritz is a drink that has Prosecco added to it.

The distinction between a wine cocktail and a cocktail with wine is the relative amounts of the various alcohols. In a wine cocktail, the wine product is the primary alcohol by volume compared to the distilled alcohol or mixer.

== List of wine cocktails ==
=== Wine variation cocktails ===
The following drinks are not technically cocktails unless wine is secondary by volume to a distilled beverage, since wine is a fermented beverage not a distilled one.

- Agua de Valencia
- Black Velvet
- Death in the Afternoon
- Flirtini
- Prince of Wales
- Sangria
- Mulled wine (Glögg)
- Wine cooler
- One-Balled Dictator — 5 parts German Liebfraumilch, 1 part French Champagne, briefly but violently shaken, then poured into a rocks glass containing one candy cinnamon ball. This produces a very white drink, to which much symbolism was applied by British WWII veterans as related in the lyrics of a crude song "Hitler Has Only Got One Ball"

=== Sparkling wine cocktails ===
- BelliniIBA
- Hugo
- SpritzIBA

==== Champagne cocktails ====
- Buck's FizzIBA
- MimosaIBA
- Kir RoyalIBA
- Ruby Dutchess
- Chicago Cocktail
- French 75IBA
- Golden Doublet
- Savoy Affair

=== Red wine cocktails ===
- Kalimotxo or Calimocho or Rioja Libre
- Tinto de Verano
- Zurracapote
- Borgoña
- "Gatorwine"

==== Port cocktails ====
- Cheeky Vimto

=== White wine cocktails ===
- Kir IBA
- Spritzer
- Rocky Mountain Railway — 1 part tomato juice, 1 part lemon soft drink, 1 part white wine

== See also ==
- List of cocktails
- Drinkware
- Port wine
