= Gatorwine =

Viral cocktail made up of red wine and Gatorade

- Type: Wine cocktail

Gatorwine is a viral cocktail made up of red wine and Gatorade. The original recipe specifies using equal parts light blue (either Glacier Freeze or Cool Blue) gatorade and red wine "cheap, under 12 dollars", served from a chilled glass or on the rocks.

Created by user GoatsNowhere, it was submitted to the YouTube channel Binging with Babish for the video titled Ranking Your STRANGEST Recipes | Best with Babish on Jul 30, 2024 where it was made with one part Gatorade Zero Cool Blue and a Barefoot pinot noir. The host Andrew Rea quipped about its "versatility" and addition of electrolytes, noting it was similar to a sangria and in his words “In a very disgusting, perverse way, I like it.”. He continued to remake and drink the cocktail throughout the episode, often stopping to sing song parodies and opine how the gatorwine helped him get through some of the less palatable recipes. The video quickly received over 3 million views and soon became memetic throughout the Babish fandom before trending on TikTok and Reddit, eventually making it to various news outlets. Rea would later follow-up with a dedicated gatorwine video.

Popular variations on the cocktail include mixing different varieties of gatorade and wine. Mixologist content-creator Prescott Vanmeyer III suggested the idea could be used to stretch one's red wine supply, insisting that "Glacier Freeze" was the optimal pairing. The sports drink's sugar and sodium is noted to balance out acidity and bitterness at the cost of complexity, but may make wine more approachable for those not used to drinking it. Speculation that the addition of Gatorade may reduce the risk of hangover however is perhaps exaggerated. Phoebe Miles, daughter of James Cade, the creator of Gatorade; said he would have gotten a laugh from the mixture.

== See also ==
- List of cocktails
