= Schorle =

Mixed drink

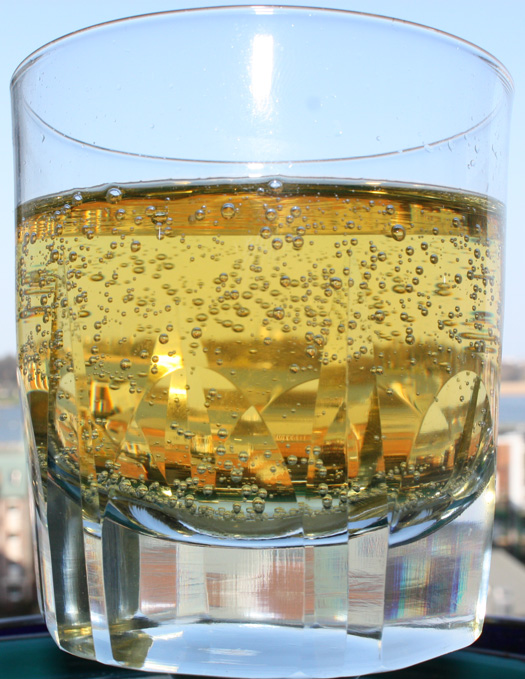
Apfelschorle

Schorle (German: [ˈʃɔʁlə]) is a German beverage made by diluting juice or wine with carbonated water or lemonade (lemon-lime soda). The most common variety is Apfelschorle (made from apple juice and sparkling mineral water). Bottled Schorle can often be found alongside soft drinks at restaurants and grocery stores. Due to its dilution it is less sweet or alcoholic than the original beverage, making it better suited as a refreshment on hot summer days or as an alternative to beer at the biergarten or weinstube.

Typical proportions are half seltzer in a high glass and half juice or wine. In the Palatinate, in Germany, a wine schorle may be almost all wine, with water considerably less than 1/4 of the total.

== Varieties ==
There is no specific word for Schorle in the English language. However, Spritzer is very similar with the slight difference of Schorle typically being a freshly mixed drink and not usually sold in cans or bottles as spritzers sometimes are.

Schorle, Spritzer and Gespritzter are all expressions for similar variations of Schorle:

- Wine with mineral water
1. sour Schorle (“Schorle sauer”), sour spritzed Schorle (“Sauergespritzter”)
2. in Austria: white/red spritzed or simply spritzer (“Gespritzter” or “G’spritzter”)
- Wine with lemonade
1. sweet Schorle which is also known as the “Arbeitersekt” which can be translated as “worker’s sparkling wine”
- Wine with Cola
1. ”Cola-Schoppen”
2. in Austria: red Cola or white Cola
- Juice with mineral water
1. ”Saftschorle”, “Fruchtschorle or “Fruchtsaftschorle”
2. in Austria: spritzed apple juice, spritzed orange juice etc.

Schorle (usually with the female German article “die”, but in Baden-Württemberg typically with the neutral German article “das” or male German article “der” and in the Palatinate area with the male German article “der” as well) is very popular as a refreshment especially in summer. The mixing proportions are mostly approximately 1:1 but in case of Schorle with juice the proportions are usually unbalanced and there is often far more mineral water in the drink.

== Origin of the term Schorle ==
According to the Duden dictionary of etymology, the word Schorlemorle, which occurred first as Schurlemurle in Lower Bavaria, is since the 18th century a designation for a mixed drink consisting of wine and sparkling mineral water. The origin of the word is uncertain; perhaps it is due to a play on words, similar to that in the 16th century, where the designations for beer, scormorrium in Münster and Murlepuff in Strasbourg, could be ascertained. The Southern German word Schurimuri, which dates from the 16th century and means “excited, hectic”, and the older Low German word Schurrmurr, which means “mishmash”, might be related to it.

According to Kluge, the word Schorlemorle, however, is probably based upon the vernacular Southern German word schuren, which means "to bubble" or "to fizz".

In an article of the Südwest Presse, Henning Petershagen lists also other attempts to interpret the origin of this word, for example a linguistic relationship to the Dutch term schorriemorrie, which means "ragtag" or "rabble".

The digitale bibliotheek voor de Nederlandse letteren provides evidence that the word originates from the Persian-Turkish schurmur which means "confusion, turmoil" and is similarly present in Albanian, Serbian, Slovenian and Russian, up to the Spanish churriburri. The latter can be found in the dictionary of the royal-Spanish Academy as zurriburri ("muddle", "base subject", "plebs"). Schorle is said to have formed thus; the oriental schurimuri came to Europe with its original meaning "muddle" where it was established as a character denotation (also as family name) and as a term to refer to the beverage-muddle.

== Mixing with wine ==
=== Germany ===
Schorle made with fruit juice is subject to the order on the regulation of fruit and soft drinks (cf. Fruchtsaft- und Erfrischungsgetränkeverordnung).

==== Weinschorle (wine spritzer) ====
Wine is the basis of wine schorle or wine spritzer. Preferred wine varieties are Riesling (Riesling schorle / Riesling spritzer), Blauer Portugieser, vin gris, Müller-Thurgau, Silvaner or other red wine. Depending on what the wine is mixed with, a wine schorle can be called "sour" when it is prepared with carbonated water, "sweet" when prepared with carbonated lemonade, or "sweet and sour" when made with some of both.

In the Palatinate, the ratio of wine is often much larger; depending on the waiting staff, the glass is filled almost completely with wine and diluted with only a spritzer of water, especially in wine bars and at wine festivals. In the Palatinate, schorle is traditionally served in a special glass that holds 0.5 liters, a Palatinate pint glass. A regional term for this glass is “Dubbeglas”.

Similarly to schorle, wine is sometimes mixed with cola: "red cola" and "white cola" are served, meaning cola mixed with red or white wine respectively.

==== Gespritzter ====
Schorle is also called Gespritzter in some areas of Germany but this doesn't always mean the same thing:

In Hesse, 'Gespritzter' stands for a 2:1, sometimes even a 3:1 mixture of apple wine and sparkling water. At traditional apple wine pubs, this mixture is only served in corrugated apple wine glasses. Today it is also known as Sauergespritzter, so that it can be differentiated from 'Süßgespritzten', which is made with lemonade.

In Rheinhessen a 'Gespritzter' or 'sauer Gespritzter' is a mixture made out of white wine or red wine together with sparkling water. In addition, there are also mixtures with cola or lemonade.

In Bavaria and Austria 'Gespritzter' basically refers to the same drink.

=== Austria ===
According to §3 of the German Weinbezeichnungsverordnung, which is a decree for the labelling of wine, a G'spritzter (also Gespritzter, Spritzer) is a mixed drink with at least 50% wine and up to 50% soda or mineral water. The drink is required to contain at least 4.5% by volume of alcohol after mixing. The name Schorle is unusual in Austria.

Colloquially the expression Sommerspritzer or Sommergespritzter is used for a mixture with less wine and Winterspritzer for a mixture with more wine.

There are red as well as white Gespritzter, though until the 1980s only the white wine mixtures were served in rural areas. Normally no special grape variety is specified; in practice only table wines are used. Most often Grüner Veltliner (white grape variety) or Zweigelt (red grape variety) is used.

Customarily, Gespritzter is served in 0.25-litre stemware or mug-like glass. If a large Gespritzter is ordered, one gets 0.4 or 0.5 litre, generally in a beer mug.

Sweet Gespritzter is made with herbal lemonade (for example Almdudler); other terms are Almweiß, Liftler oder Tiroler. A Kaiserspritzer or Kaisergespritzter (emperor spritz) is Gespritzter with a shot of elderflower syrup.

In Vienna on rare occasions a Gespritzter is also called "Sprüher" or "Sprühwein". In some areas of Lower Austria it is also called "Siphon". In Styria it is called "Mischung" (mixture).

In the state of Vorarlberg the names "white-sweet", "white-sour", "red-sour", and "red-sweet" are common. These are Gespritze served in 0.25 litre stemware or glasses with a handle. The mixing ratio is about 50% white or red wine with 50% sparkling water (sour) or lemonade (sweet). The name Gespritzter is universally understood but rarely used. The Styrian name "Mischung" is largely unknown here.

A "Gespritzter" (or "die Gespritzte" for females) is also often used as a derogatory term for a person in Eastern Austria.

=== Switzerland ===
In Switzerland, a Gespritzter is white wine mixed with either mineral water (a Sauergespritzter, or sour spritzer) or with lemonade (a Süßgespritzter, or sweet spritzer).

=== Hungary ===
The various mixtures of (generally dry) wine and sparkling mineral water also have a long tradition and are very popular in Hungary. They are generally called fröccs (spritzers) but the numerous variations (with wine and water in differing ratios) have various imaginative names in Hungarian.

=== Other Countries ===
Derived from Austrian Gespritzten, Spritz (or Spriz, Spriss or Sprisseto) is also drunk in Italy.

In the former Yugoslavian area, wine with mineral water is commonly called špricer or gemišt (spritzer or mixed). The combination of red wine with cola or lemonade is however called (especially in Croatia) Bambus.

In Spain, the combination of red wine and lemonade is known as Tinto de verano.

In the Basque country, a popular drink is kalimotxo, a combination of red wine and cola.

In Great Britain, red or white wine mixed with lemonade or carbonated water has been well known since the 1980s as a spritzer. In the United States, similar drinks are known as wine coolers.

== Mixing with juice ==
Schorle with juice, also known as "fruit schorle" or "fruit juice schorle", is a mixture of, in most cases, carbonated water and fruit juice. Because of its massive popularity, drink manufacturers offer bottled fruit schorle. The proportion of water to juice can vary considerably, however it is typically under 50%, usually 40% to 60%. "Apfelschorle" is particularly popular but sourer or bitterer varieties of fruit also work quite well; for example using grapefruit, which has juice that, when undiluted, is otherwise less palatable. It is also good for diluting particularly sweet varieties of fruit, such as cherry juice schorle. Fruit juice schorle contains fewer calories than pure fruit juice.

=== Apfelschorle (apple juice spritzer) ===
Apple schorle is often drunk as a sports drink since it contains both minerals and carbohydrates and is almost isotonic.

Commercially available apple schorlen have a fruit juice content between 55% and 60% and contain 5 to 6 grams of fructose. Sometimes synthetic apple flavouring is added, which can give the drink an unnatural and strange taste.
