= Fuentebella, Spain =

Fuentebella Village
- Ghost village
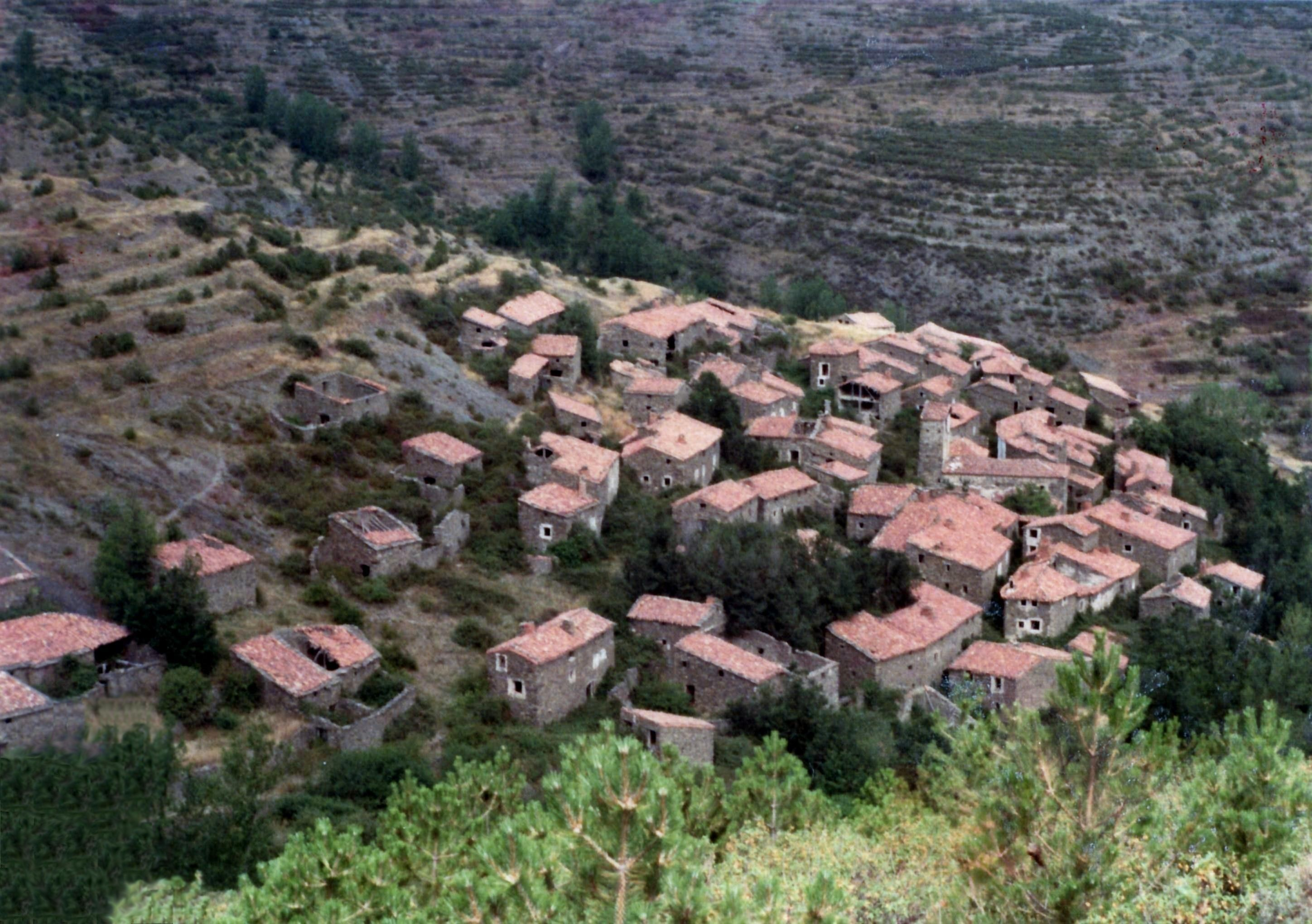
- Fuentebella Village
- Nickname: Village of Two Lies
- Location in Spain
- Coordinates: 42°1′59″N 2°09′18″W
- Country: Spain
- Autonomous community: Castile and León
- Province: Soria

Population (1970s)
  - Total: 0

Fuentebella Village (also known as the Village of Two Lies) is a ghost village located in Sierra de Alcatama, Soria Province, Spain.

== History ==
The village was nicknamed “Village of Two Lies”, as it neither had a fountain or was it beautiful. It can only be accessed by dirt routes. After the fall of the Old Regime, the town became a constitutional municipality in the region of Old Castile, district of Ágreda. In a census of 1842, Fuentebella had 40 homes and 158 residents. By the early 20th century, the village had around 200 residents, mainly shepherds who raised goats and sheep. The Church of Santiago Apóstol, which featured interior arches, a tower, and bell, was decided to James the Great. Fuentebella celebrated its patron Saint, Santiago Apóstal. Every July 25, and also in September, the village held a Thanksgiving festival with a Virgin of the Rosary procession. The residents would share a meal, often a sheep, while the visitors drank zurracapote, which is a traditional drink made from wine, sugar, cinnamon, and lemon. Local cuisine included game meats such as quail, rabbit, partridge, and also homemade bread and cheese. The village's population declined, due to the harsh weather, lack of vehicular access, and remote location. At the end of the 20th century the village had 135 inhabitants and only 34 houses. In the 1960s, the Spanish government, through the ICONA program, purchased the land to focus on reforestation efforts. Finally, in the 1970s, the last villagers left, leaving the whole town abandoned. In 1978, following the administrative restructuring in Spain, the village became a part of the municipality of San Pedro Manrique.

=== Present Day ===
Since then, the former municipality has been removed from maps. Currently, the old village is overgrown with thick pine trees and bushes, with many houses still remaining. Many of the houses have been demolished, or even have no roof. It can be publicly accessed by hikers.
