= La Casera =

Spanish brand of soda

- Type: Soda
- Manufacturer: Suntory Beverage & Food Spain
- Origin: Madrid, Spain
- Introduced: 1949
- Colour: Clear
- Variants: La Casera Limón, La Casera Naranja, La Casera Cola, Tinto de La Casera
- Website: www.lacasera.es

La Casera is a traditional Spanish brand of soda. It is one of the most popular soft drinks in Spain.

It is a sweet fizzy drink known in Spain as gaseosa. It can be served as a regular soda, although it is also customary to mix it with wine, receiving the name of tinto de verano, or beer, called a clara or rubia. La Casera may also be used to prepare sangria.

The origin of the company dates back to Francisco Duffo Foix, born in Saint-Laurent-de-Neste, France, in 1873. On a trip to San Sebastián, Spain, he met his future wife, Victoria González, with whom he eventually had five children. From that moment on, his life was connected to Spain.

The company was founded in 1949 by the Duffo family in Madrid, and its successful advertising campaigns soon made La Casera one of the leading beverage brands in the country. In Spain, the popularity of the product has led to the use of its name to refer to any citrus soda, regardless of the brand.

It was acquired in 2001 by the Cadbury-Schweppes group, and is currently owned by Suntory.
