= Ernst Mittag =

German Bauhaus-trained architect (1906–1991)

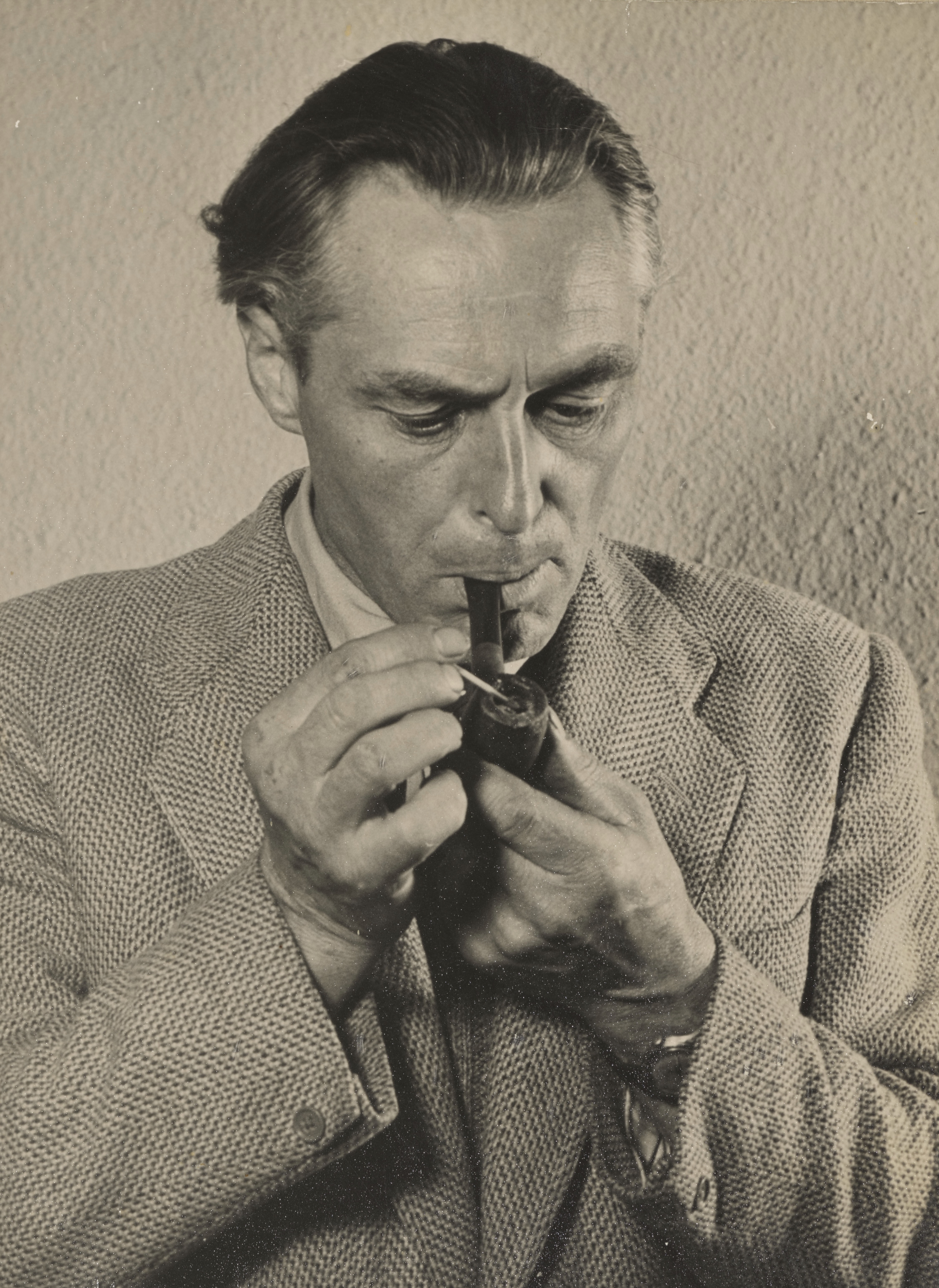
Ernst Mittag, Sweet Valley 1949

Ernst Mittag (also Gerhardt Ernst Mittag) (born April 4, 1906, in Riesa, Germany; died May 15, 1991, in Cape Town, South Africa) was a German Bauhaus-trained architect and husband to the Hungarian photographer and graphic designer, Etel Fodor-Mittag. They were married in Berlin in 1930.

== Life ==
Ernst Mittag was christened on 17 June 1906 in Riesa and confirmed on 20 March 1921 in Coswig. From 1925 to 15 July 1927 Ernst Mittag studied at the Department for Furniture and Interior Design and from 1927 to 29 February 1928 at the Staatliche Akademie für Kunstgewerbe in Dresden (State Academy of Fine Arts in Dresden).

== Studies at the Bauhaus ==
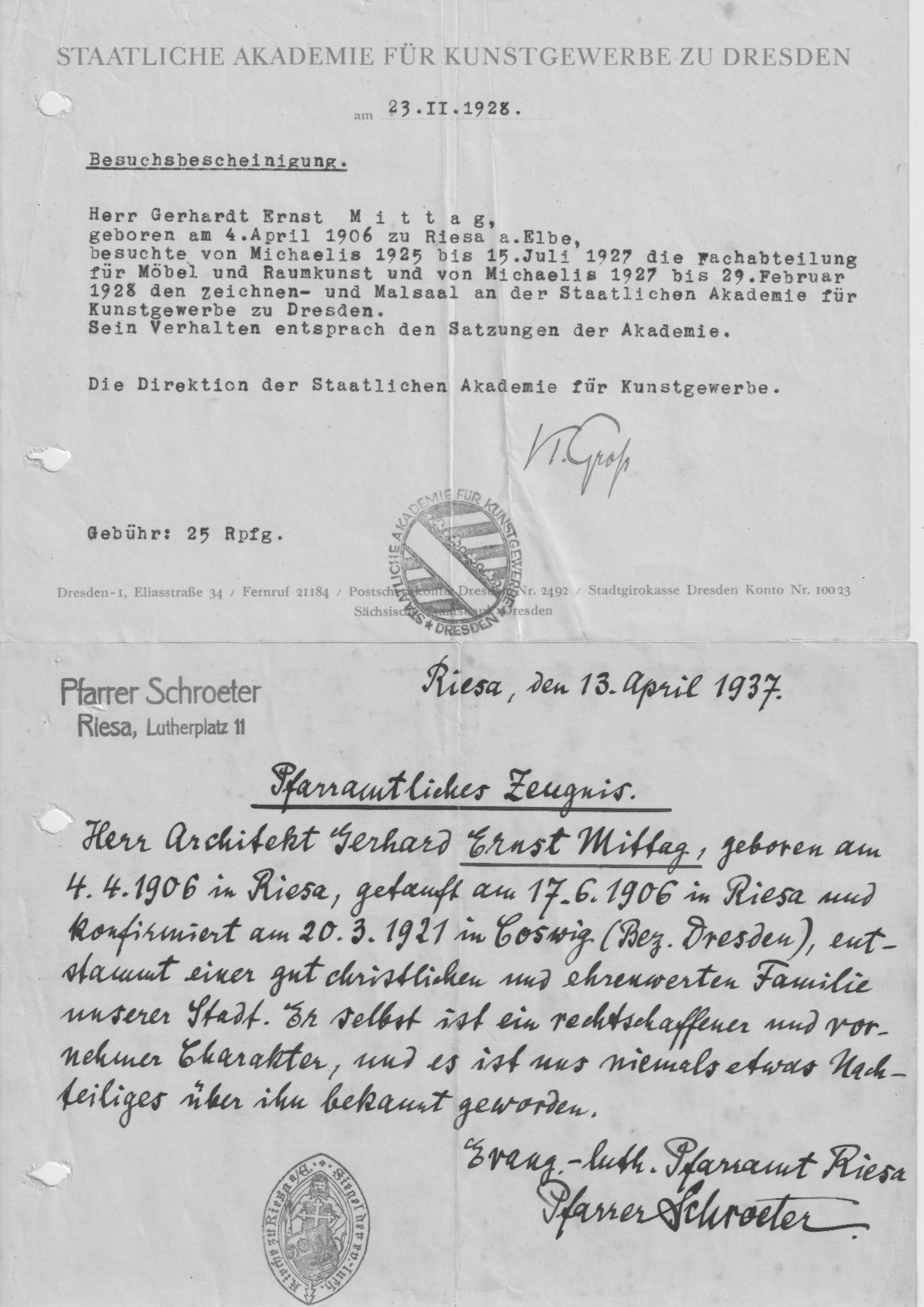
Attendance certificate Gerhardt Ernst Mittag at Staatliche Akademie für Kunstgewerbe zu Dresden, dated 23 February 1928

At the Bauhaus, he was under the influence of leading figures such as Hannes Meyer and participated in the school's architecture program, combining craftsmanship with avant-garde ideas. He met his wife, Etel Fodor, also a Bauhaus student, during this period. Ernst Mittag studied at the Bauhaus in the building department with Ludwig Mies van der Rohe and Ludwig Hilberseimer. He was friends with Lotte Rothschild and Heinz and Ricarda Schwerin. Waldemar Alder and Willi Jungmittag were also close friends of the Mittags; Jungmittag even lived with them in Berlin and was their best man when they got married in 1930 in Berlin. The friends often only survived on Etel Fodor-Mittag's care packages that she received from her parents in Hungary.

On 11 October 1932 Mittag obtained his Bauhaus diploma for architecture from the building department in Dessau. His son, Michael, believes that his diploma thesis was the design of a portion of a hospital in Czechoslovakia.

Mittag was deeply impacted by the Bauhaus's interdisciplinary approach and its social-political awakening in the late 1920s and early 1930s. As a committed left-winger and member of the Communist Party, the rise of Nazism forced him and his wife to flee Germany in 1938 to South Africa, where they continued their creative and political engagement.

== Work after the Bauhaus in Berlin ==
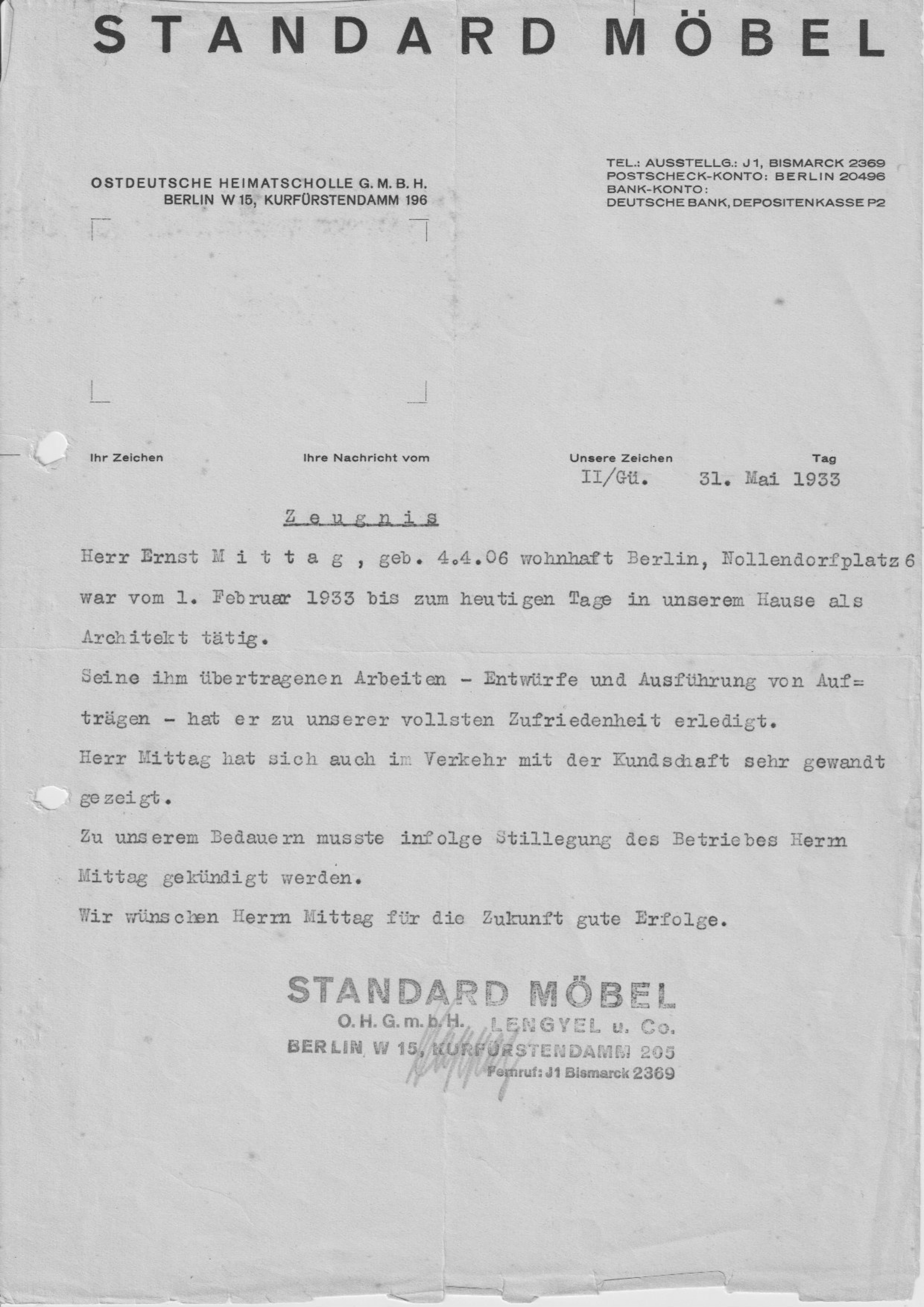
Work reference Standard Möbel O.H.G.m.b.H. Lengyel u. Co., dated 31 May 1933

After his studies at the Bauhaus, Ernst Mittag then went on to work in Berlin for the Hungarian architect Fred Fórbat, who had taught at the Staatliche Bauhaus in Weimar from 1920 to 1922. In his work reference from Fórbat (dated 15 May 1931), Mittag was certified to have worked there for the past two years and to have been involved actively in the construction of the Siemens housing estate in Berlin Haselhorst, in particular in the preparation of the detailed drawings and the supervision of the construction.

From August until November 1932 Ernst Mittag was involved in planning a brick factory for the Beociner Zementfabriks AG. From 1 February until 31 May 1933, Mittag worked for Standard Möbel in Berlin. Standard Möbel was originally founded by the Bauhaus master Marcel Breuer and the Hungarian architect and designer Kálman Lengyel in 1926/27 to produce and sell tubular steel furniture. It was soon sold to the furniture manufacturer Thonet in 1929. Lengyel subsequently founded his own company called Standard Möbel Lengyel & Co. at Kurfürstendamm 205 in Berlin, which is the company that Mittag worked for. In his work reference it is stated that Ernst Mittag “designed and produced orders” and that “he has proven to be very adept at dealing with customers.” This work reference also states that Ernst Mittag lived at that time at Nollendorfplatz 6 in Berlin.

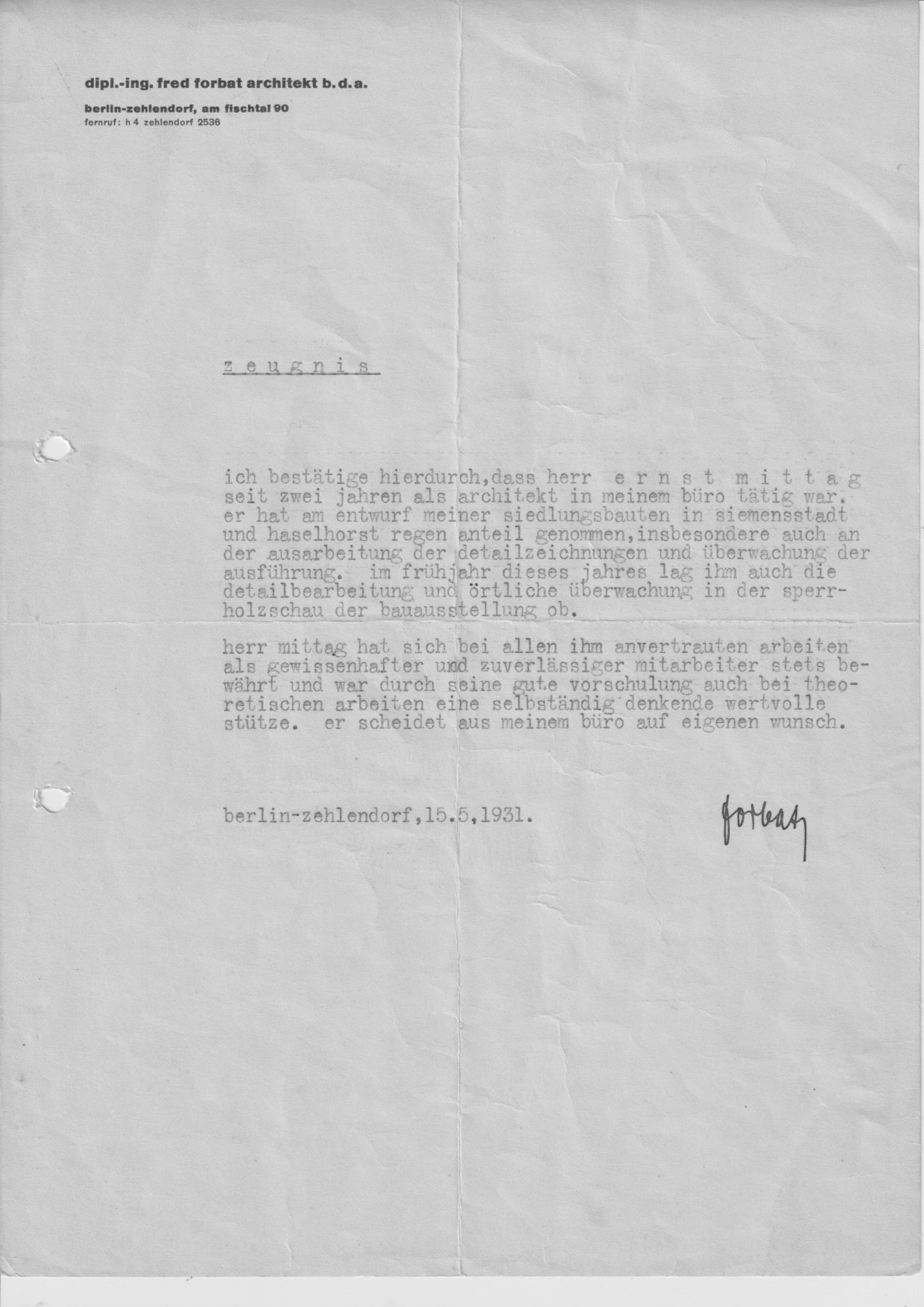
Work reference for Ernst Mittag by Fred Fórbat

From September 1935 until February 1937 Ernst Mittag worked for the architectural office Dietrich & Liebsch that designed for example a residential complex at Andernacher Straße and Königswinterstraße in Berlin in 1929, which is today listed as a historic monument. Here again, as in Fred Forbát's office, Mittag was in charge of housing and settlement projects.

== Political work and emigration ==
At the Bauhaus, Ernst and Etel Mittag got in touch with communism. They held secret political meetings in their apartment in Berlin and were active members of the KPD. In Berlin, they ran a clandestine Communist newspaper with their friends. Once the 1936 Summer Olympics in Berlin were over, they decided that Etel should go back to Hungary to live with her parents. She was Jewish and was not safe anymore in Germany. Ernst Mittag stayed in Berlin and went to Budapest whenever he had the chance to visit his wife. When the authorities found out about the newspaper, he was arrested and spent a few months in jail circa 1937. When he was released, the Mittags decided to emigrate. Etel Fodor's uncle Theodore Felbert, who had already immigrated to South Africa and was wealthy and influential, offered to arrange and pay for their emigration.

In March 1938 Ernst Mittag arrived at Cape Town on a ship from Genoa. Traveling from Berlin to Genoa mostly on foot and hitch hiking to avoid official border crossings. Etel Fodor and their 18-months-old son Thomas arrived in November 1938 via the same route, although they had taken the train from Budapest to Genoa.

Arriving in South Africa was a big shock for both Ernst Mittag and Etel Fodor-Mittag. As convinced Communists, everything that Apartheid stood for was against their beliefs. They soon became active in the South African Communist Party. Almost all left wing, anti-government organizations were banned and their members movements restricted in many ways. In Ernst Mittag's case he was not permitted to leave South Africa for a period of 16 years because of his party membership.

== Career in South Africa ==
In South Africa, Ernst Mittag pursued his profession as an architect. During World War II, he worked for the architect Norman Lubynski in Cape Town. Mittag soon practiced as an architect in his own office. He most notably designed the Appletiser factory on Applethwaite Farm in the Elgin valley, Western Cape for Edmond Lombardi. This factory design included some innovative features for pressing and bottling in a bacteria free environment and also stands as a rare documented architectural work attributed to Mittag. Edmond Lombardi, Applethwaite Farm and Appletiser became Mittag's most important client for whom he designed and supervised the construction of a high velocity apple packing facility, a village for farm workers, a crèche, a medical clinic, expansion of the original farmhouse, and supervised the construction of the Applethwaite Cold Storage Facility.

Mittag also designed an Anglican church for the farm, which was consecrated by the Archbishop of Cape Town Joost de Blank. The story is that he was introduced to the Archbishop by Edmond Lombardi as "Ernst Mittag the architect and atheist!" This did not phase the archbishop.

Prior to his work for Appletiser and Applethwaite Farm, Mittag did design work for another Edmond Lombardi enterprise, Brick and Clay Products Ltd. Mittag's experience in planning a brick factory for the Beociner Zementfabriks AG is likely the reason he was hired by Lombardi and Brick and Clay Products. Not much is known about his work there but Michael Mittag recalls that he designed a linear kiln there.

For some of his clients, Mittag also designed the furniture.

Despite professional challenges related to his political stance in apartheid-era South Africa, Mittag remained committed to social ideals.

In the bauhaus faces podcast Ernst Mittag's younger son, Michael Mittag, explained that his father took to South Africa what he had learned at the Bauhaus in Dessau and Berlin, e.g. adapting his designs for houses to the typography and climate of South Africa. Mittag developed his own style in South Africa unless he was commissioned to restore older buildings.

In 1947 Ernst Mittag and Etel Fodor bought a piece of land and established their own farm to grow table grapes. They went to an agricultural college to learn everything about Viticulture. This farm became a powerful family undertaking with the addition of a Jersey cow stud and dairy. Ernst, Etel and their two sons, Thomas and Michael did much of the farmwork themselves with the help of two permanent staff. This work was in addition to their regular jobs and studies and the G.E Mittag architectural practice.

Once both sons had left South Africa by 1967, the Mittags sold the farm.

Ernst Mittag continued to work as an architect until he was 85 years old and died in 1991.

== Passion for sailing and wood working ==
Ernst Mittag was a passionate sailor. Before his studies in Dresden and Dessau, he attended a Yachting School and built himself a yacht in the back of his parents’ house in Riesa. He eventually sailed to the Bauhaus on the river Elbe with a friend.

During his first years in South Africa, Ernst Mittag went on regular sailing trips with his first employer, Norman Lubynski. His passion for boats and sailing culminated when he and Etel Fodor competed in the 1976 race from Cape Town to Rio de Janeiro. They were both in their seventies by then.

Working with wood was Mittag's first love and interest and remained so throughout his life, from the time that he built that wooden sailing boat in his parents' backyard in Riesa to his qualifying as a cabinet maker at the Bauhaus in Dessau. His furniture designs were often integral parts of the homes he designed. He was very likely influenced by Marcel Breuer who had been the master of the Bauhaus carpentry workshop until 1928. His woodworking skills were later also applied to the design and construction of the interiors of his ocean-going yachts.

== Further references ==
Gerhard Ernst Mittag on Bauhaus Community website

Bauhaus students – Wikimedia Commons
