= Zurracapote =

Alcoholic beverage

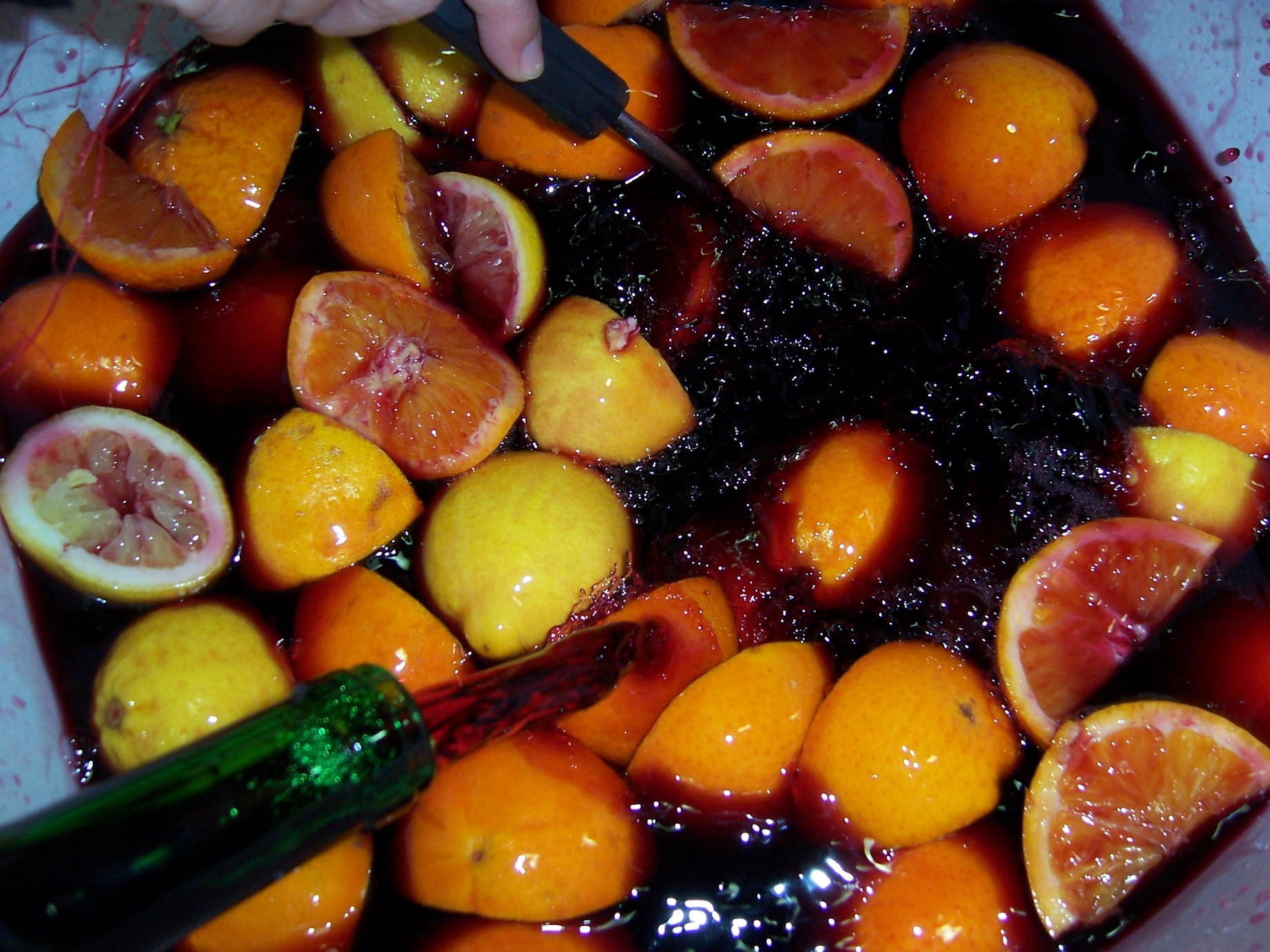
- Preparing Zurracapote
- Type: Wine cocktail
- Ingredients: red wine; fruit (peaches, lemons); sugar; cinnamon
- Standard drinkware: Goblet

Zurracapote (sometimes abbreviated as zurra) is a popular Spanish alcoholic mixed drink, similar to sangría. It consists of red wine mixed with fruit such as peaches and lemons, sugar, and cinnamon. The concoction is then traditionally left to steep for several days, though some recipes call for the addition of other alcoholic beverages, juices, and fruit extracts. The result is a mild-to-medium alcoholic drink, similar to sangría.

The drink is normally prepared in large receptacles during local festivals with many local variations in recipe. It was first drunk in Calahorra, where "Peña Phillips" developed the recipe through several competitions. It is the typical drink of the La Rioja area and nearby areas such as northern Burgos, Soria, Ribera Navarra, and the Basque Country. It is also prepared in other Spanish provinces, such as Albacete, northern Granada, Ciudad Real, Cuenca, and Guadalajara.

== See also ==
- Kalimotxo
- Sangría
