= Binging with Babish =

American online cooking series

Binging With Babish
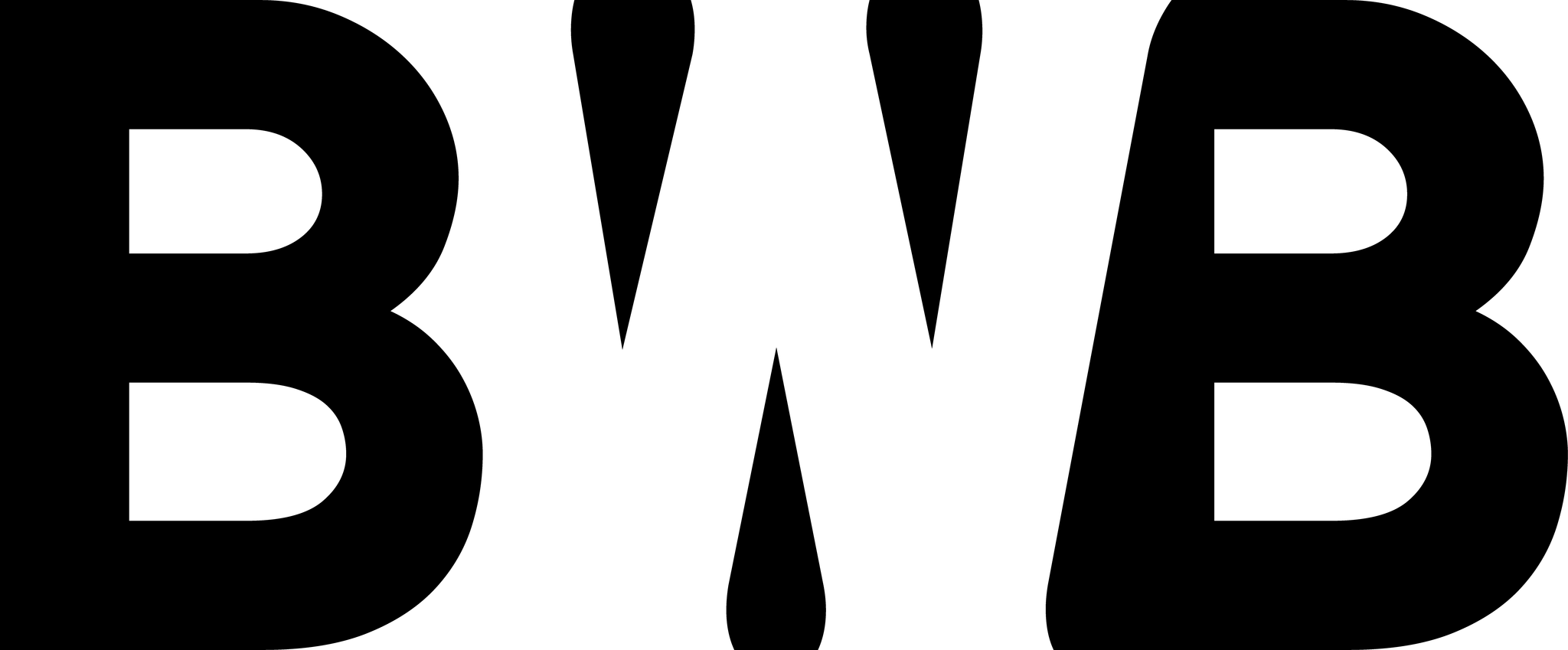

YouTube information
- Channel: Binging with Babish
- Genres: Cooking; educational; travel
- Subscribers: 10.5 million
- Views: 3.05 billion
- Last updated: January 20, 2025
- Website: babi.sh

Binging with Babish (/ˈbæbɪʃ/ BAB-ish), formerly Babish Culinary Universe, is a YouTube cooking channel created by American cook and filmmaker Andrew Rea (alias Babish) that recreates recipes featured in film, television, and video games in the Binging with Babish series, as well as more traditional recipes in the Basics with Babish series. The first video in the series was uploaded on February 10, 2016.

== History ==
The YouTube channel was created by Rea as Binging with Babish on August 21, 2006; his name was inspired by The West Wing character Oliver Babish. Three videos unrelated to Binging with Babish were uploaded to the account, two in 2007 and one in 2010. The first episode of Binging with Babish aired on February 10, 2016, which is about a Parks and Recreation burger cook-off.

Its first video to be widely circulated aired on November 14, 2016, making the "Moistmaker" sandwich from Friends. The channel's growth has been driven by fans promoting its videos on Reddit and other social media platforms. Rea created a Patreon account to earn an income, and after reaching a monthly $10,000 goal, quit his day job to work full-time on Binging with Babish, which is released weekly on Tuesdays. He spent $6,000 on a Sony digital camera, lights and editing software, and does the production, editing and narration for the videos. The cost of each episode, according to Rea, "varies wildly" because of the ever-changing variety of food and ingredients used.

Rea posts recipes for the dishes on his website and on October 3, 2017, he published a cookbook titled Eat What You Watch: A Cookbook for Movie Lovers, containing 40 recipes featured in film. He started the series Basics with Babish on October 12, 2017, teaching preparation of basic recipes, stocking up on and using essential tools and equipment for cooking, as well as a variety of cooking techniques. On October 22, 2019, Rea published his second cookbook titled Binging with Babish: 100 Recipes Recreated from Your Favorite Movies and TV Shows, containing 100 pop-culture recipes from his series.

== Shows ==
=== Binging with Babish ===
During each episode, Rea prepares step-by-step instructions on the preparation of pop culture-inspired meals. When Binging with Babish premiered on February 10, 2016, it was filmed at the kitchen of Rea's New York City apartment. Beginning with the "Meat Tornado from Parks & Rec" in August 2020, the show moved to his home studio in Brooklyn, with a voiceover added in post-production. Each episode contains dry humor and is paced at a fast speed. After creating the dish as it originally appeared, some episodes include Rea's interpretation of the recipe.

=== Others ===
The first of Rea's side-shows was Basics with Babish; as many of the movie-accurate food dishes required expensive equipment and ingredients to make them accurate, this series is instead focused on making various dishes as simple as possible, often with multiple variations. This series is also notable for featuring guest star chefs from different cultures and ethnic groups when tackling dishes from those regions, most notably the late chef Floyd Cardoz for several Indian-centric episodes.

Another show, Botched by Babish, focuses on Rea correcting food dishes that he received backlash for in the past due to his methodology, such as the pumpkin pasties from Harry Potter (as British fans pointed out how since they're pasties, they're implied to be savoury and not sweet), or the episode on poutine (due to Rea lacking access to cheese curds - an integral ingredient to the authentic version of the dish.). The series is more comedy-driven, with much of the humour derived from the dichotomy between Rea's normal personality and his more off-kilter side, as well as the interactions between him and his crew. In addition to the original format, newer episodes examine basic recipes and tackle what mistakes can be made, how they affect the final product and how to avoid them.

A third show, What's in the Fridge is an impromptu show that occurs when Rea and his crew are either out of video ideas or they have too many leftovers in the show's fridge that are close to expiration. Rea then does his best to come up with a dish that incorporates as many ingredients as he can.

In 2024, Rea began to produce other shows: Can Babish Beat?, where he compares two versions of the same dish from prestigious New York restaurants and tries to create a better version, and Best with Babish (formally Ranked with Babish), where he compares different products in the same category and ranks them on a tier list (such as ranking Trader Joe's homebrand frozen pasta or ranking different types of instant ramen.)

On February 18, 2025, Rea started a new show, "Cookalongs" where he cooks a recipe from start to finish at normal speed. These long form videos last from 1 to 2 hours. While cooking, Rea discusses his life and thoughts.

The final Rea-centric series on the channel is Being with Babish, which focuses on Rea giving back to the community and his fans, as well as other miscellaneous subjects such as his weight loss journey.

In addition to these series, there are other series posted on the channel that are run by different chefs, cooking content-creators, behind-the-scenes staff and Rea's personal friends. These projects include:

- Stump Sohla, featuring Sohla El-Waylly, which featured Sohla making dishes in a randomly chosen format or theme.
- Pruébalo, hosted by chef Rick Martinez, follows him exploring Mexico and its authentic, regional cuisine.
- Alvin Zhou, a senior manager for Buzzfeed's food channel, Tasty, hosts Anime with Alvin Zhou and Arcade with Alvin Zhou -which are focused on food from anime and video games respectively. The latest addition, Anything with Alvin Zhou generally focuses on recreating dishes seen in viral food videos.
- The FundaKendalls and Kendall Combines are hosted by Kendall Beach, Rea's Kitchen Producer. The former follows a similar format to Basics with Babish albeit with a focus on technique, and the latter challenges Kendall in creating dishes that combine two ingredients that normally don't pair well together, such as kimchi and cottage cheese.
- Street Foods with Senpai Kai is hosted by food YouTuber Senpai Kai, where he attempts to recreate absurd, yet viral, street food.
- Soy Boys, hosted by Rea's frequent cameraman and editor Brad Cash, focuses on vegan dishes that are designed to help his friend, Chris Creasy, lose weight.
- Football Fusion is hosted by Sawyer, Rea's close friend as well both the general counsel and business manager for the Babish company, who lacks experience with cooking. The series is centered on creating dishes that are fusions between two dishes from regions with prominent NFL teams, such as Skyline Chili Cakes, based on Cincinnati's skyline chili and Baltimore's crab cakes.

== Episodes ==
Series	Season	Episodes	Originally released	
Series	Season	Episodes	First released	Last released
Main series
Binging with Babish	1	82	February 12, 2016	May 15, 2018
Binging with Babish	2	65	May 22, 2018	January 21, 2020
Binging with Babish	3	78	January 28, 2020	TBA
Spin-offs
Basics with Babish	1	16	October 12, 2017	May 30, 2018
Basics with Babish	2	31	June 14, 2018	February 27, 2020
Basics with Babish	3	130	March 11, 2020	TBA
Being with Babish	1	9	March 22, 2019	February 21, 2020
Stump Sohla	1	11	September 24, 2020	January 9, 2021
Anime with Alvin	1	59	April 1, 2021	TBA
Botched By Babish	1	18	May 18, 2021	TBA
Pruébalo ft. Rick Martinez	1	9	July 10, 2021	July 30, 2023
The FundaKendalls	1	3	November 11, 2021	May 21, 2022
Soy Boys	1	6	March 24, 2022	November 13, 2022
Kendall Combines	1	5	August 16, 2022	November 26, 2023
Arcade with Alvin Zhou	1	27	August 23, 2022	TBA
Football Fusion with Sawyer	1	9	September 4, 2022	January 18, 2024
Street Food with Senpai Kai	1	8	February 2, 2023	October 29, 2023
Anything with Alvin Zhou	1	25	December 15, 2023	TBA
Best with Babish	1	41	January 11, 2024	TBA
Babish Beats	1	3	May 28, 2024	TBA
Cook-Along	1	5	February 18, 2025	TBA

== Awards and nominations ==
Year	Title	Award	Result
2017	7th Streamy Awards	Food	Nominated
2017	7th Streamy Awards	Breakout Creator	Nominated
2018	10th Shorty Awards	Best in Food	Nominated
2019	9th Streamy Awards	Food	Won
2020	10th Streamy Awards	Show of the Year	Nominated
2020	10th Streamy Awards	Food	Nominated
2021	11th Streamy Awards	Show of the Year	Nominated
2021	11th Streamy Awards	Food	Nominated

== See also ==
- List of YouTubers
- Gatorwine
