= Kir royal =

French cocktail

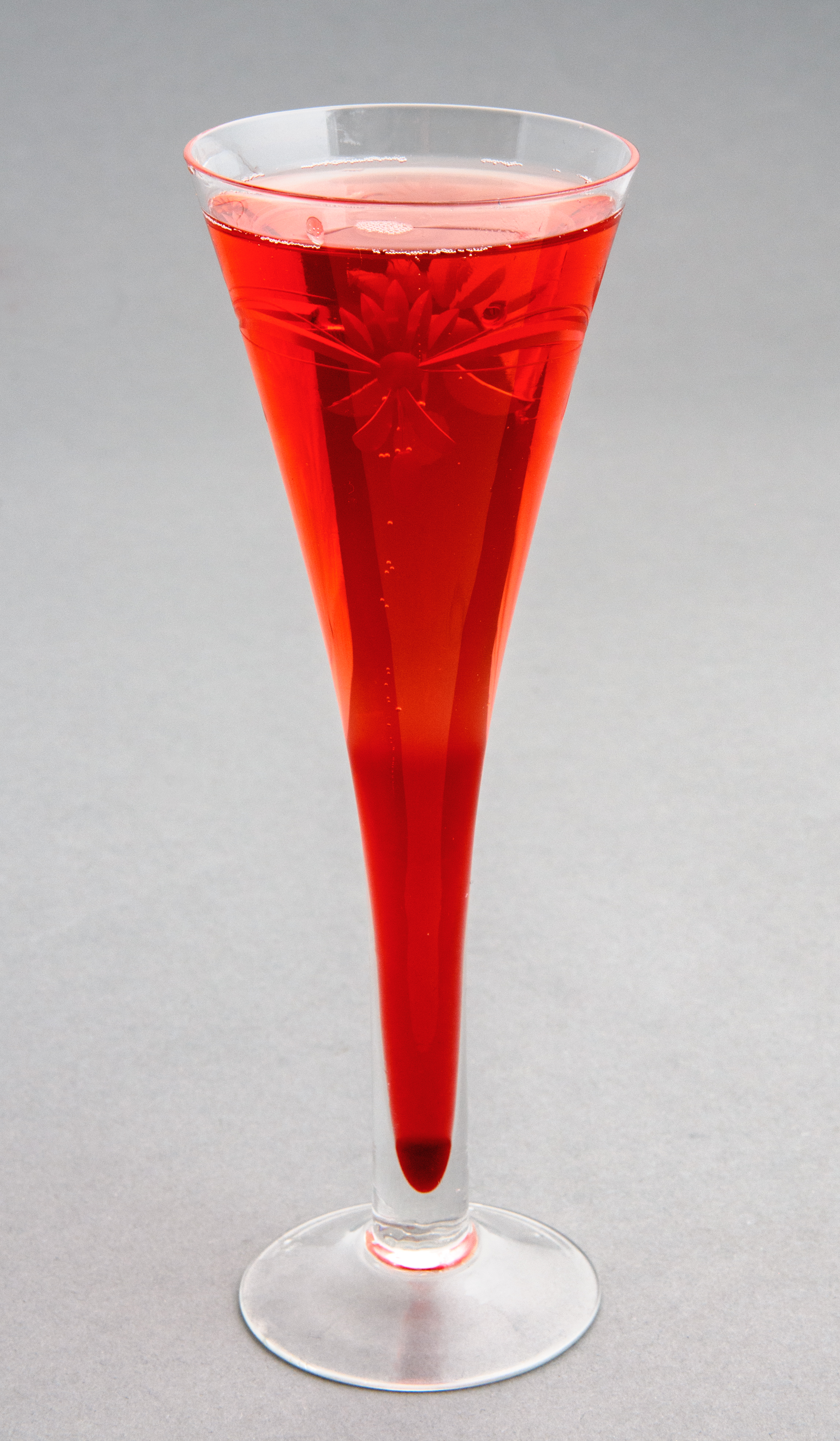
- Type: Wine cocktail
- Ingredients: 9 cl (3 ounces) (9 parts) champagne; 1 cl (0.33 ounce) (1 part) crème de cassis
- Base spirit: Champagne
- Standard drinkware: Champagne flute
- Preparation: Add the crème de cassis to the bottom of the glass, then top up champagne.

The Kir royal (French pronunciation: [kiʁ ʁwa.jal]), also known as Kir royale, is a French cocktail, a variation on the Kir. It consists of crème de cassis topped with champagne, rather than the white wine used in traditional Kir. This apéritif is typically served in a flute glass.
