= Crème de cassis =

Liqueur made from blackcurrants

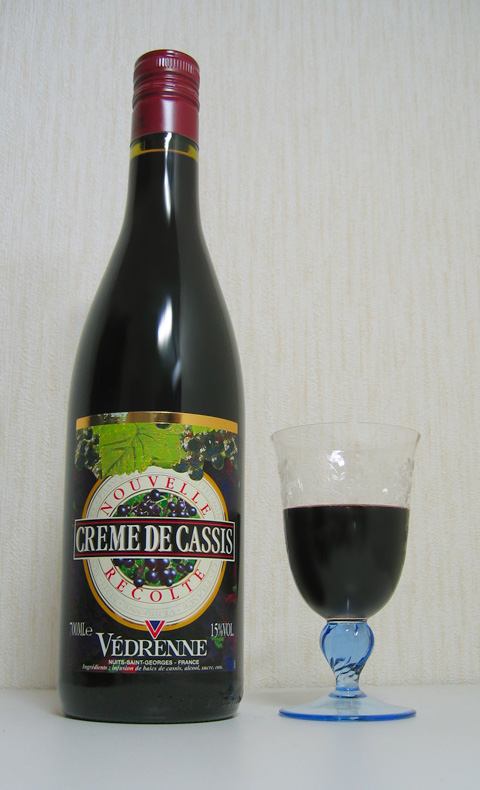
- Crème de cassis bottled at 15% ABV
- Type: Liqueur
- Origin: France (Burgundy)
- Introduced: 1841
- Alcohol by volume: 15%
- Colour: Dark red
- Flavour: Sweet
- Ingredients: Blackcurrant

Crème de cassis (French pronunciation: [kʁɛm də kasis]) (also known as cassis liqueur) is a sweet, dark red liqueur made from blackcurrants.

Several cocktails are made with crème de cassis, notably the popular wine cocktail kir and its sparkling variant, the kir royal. Other cocktails that use it include the original tequila sunrise and the El Diablo, a tequila buck.

It may also be served as an after-dinner liqueur or as a frappé.

== Ingredients ==
It is made from blackcurrants crushed and soaked in alcohol, with sugar added afterward.

The quality of crème de cassis depends upon the variety of fruit used, the content of the berries, and the production process.

== Origin and production ==
The modern version of the beverage first appeared in 1841, when it displaced "ratafia de cassis", which had been produced in prior centuries.

While crème de cassis is a specialty of Burgundy, it is also made in Anjou, England, Luxembourg, Alberta, Quebec, Vermont and Tasmania.

In 1979, Germany attempted to restrict the import based on the alcohol content being too low. The European Court of Justice found this to be a breach of trade, in Rewe-Zentral AG v Bundesmonopolverwaltung für Branntwein.

In 2015, the new protected geographical indication (PGI) "Crème de Cassis de Bourgogne" was approved. Promoted by a syndicate of fruit producers and liqueur companies from Burgundy, this "Crème de Cassis de Bourgogne" guarantees Burgundian origin and the minimum quantity of berries used in its production, essentially the Noir de Bourgogne variety. If the berries come specifically from Dijon, the capital of Burgundy, the label may say "Crème de Cassis de Dijon" instead.

== Sales ==
Nearly 16 million litres (4.2 million US gallons) of crème de cassis are produced annually in France. It is consumed mostly in France but is also exported.
