= Apfelschorle =

Apple and carbonated water drink

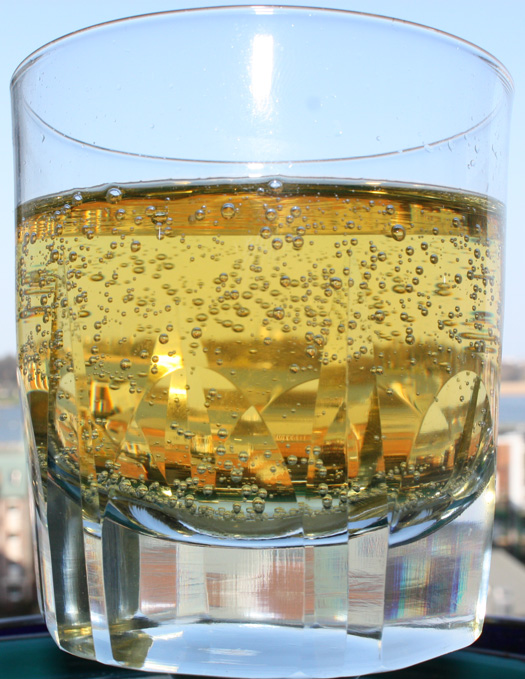
A glass of Apfelschorle.

Apfelschorle (pronounced [ˈapfəlʃɔɐ̯lə]) (apple spritzer), also Apfelsaftschorle (apple juice spritzer) or Apfelsaft gespritzt (splashed apple juice, more widely used in Hessen, Bavaria, and Austria) in German, is a popular soft drink in Switzerland, Germany, and Austria. It consists of carbonated mineral water and apple juice. The broader category Fruchtschorle consists of any fruit juice mixed with carbonated water, but Apfelschorle is by far the most common. Spritzer (that is, wine mixed with carbonated water) is called Weinschorle.

== Nutrition ==
Apfelschorle contains fewer calories and is less sweet than pure apple juice. It is also nearly isotonic. This makes it popular in summer and among athletes.

== Content ==
Commercially available Apfelschorle generally contains between 50% and 60% juice. Often, lemon juice concentrate is added.

== Production ==
Brands of Apfelschorle in Germany include Spreequell, Gerolsteiner (which also sells mineral water), Rhodius, Bizzl, and many other local brands. The most famous brand in Switzerland is Ramseier. However, domestically and in most bars and restaurants Apfelschorle is usually mixed ad hoc from apple juice and carbonated water.

== See also ==
- Schorle
- Appletiser
