= Kir (cocktail) =

French cocktail with crème de cassis and white wine

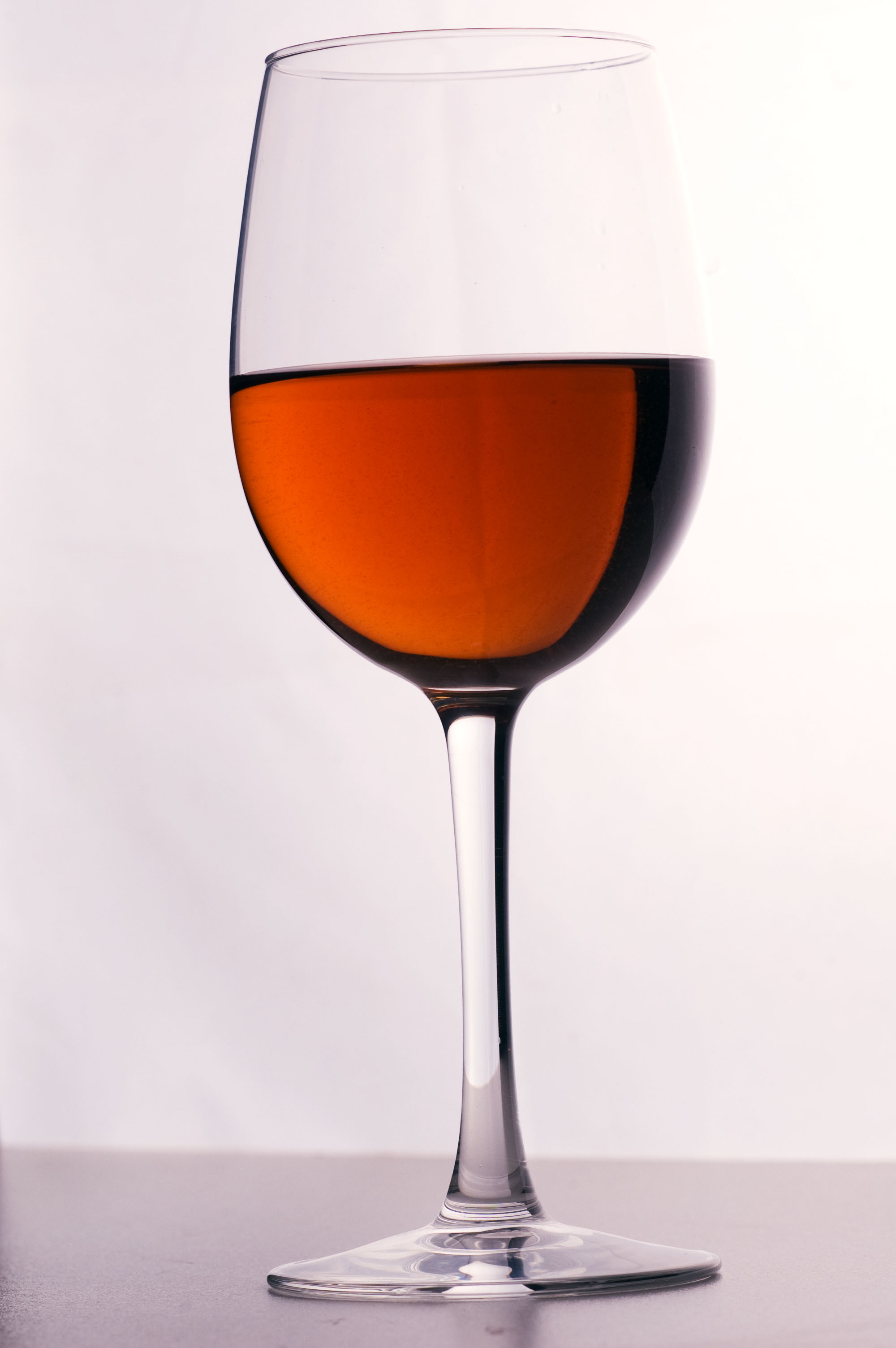
- Type: Wine cocktail
- Ingredients: 9 cl (9 parts) white wine; 1 cl (1 part) crème de cassis
- Base spirit: Wine
- Standard drinkware: Wine glass (white)
- Served: Straight up: chilled, without ice
- Preparation: Add the crème de cassis to the bottom of the glass, then top up with wine.

Kir is a French cocktail made with a measure of crème de cassis (blackcurrant liqueur) topped up with white wine.

In France it is usually drunk as an apéritif before a meal or snack. Originally made with Bourgogne Aligoté, a Burgundy white wine, today it is made with various white wines throughout France, according to the region and the barkeeper. Many prefer a white Chardonnay-based Burgundy, such as Chablis.

== History ==
Formerly known as blanc-cassis, the beverage is now named after Félix Kir (1876–1968), mayor of Dijon in Burgundy. Kir was a pioneer of the twinning movement in the aftermath of the Second World War, and popularized the drink by offering it at receptions to visiting delegations. Besides treating his international guests well, he was also promoting two economic products of the region. Kir allowed one of Dijon's producers of crème de cassis to use his name, then extended the right to their competitors as well. According to Rolland (2004), the reinvention of blanc-cassis (post-1945) was necessitated by the German Army's confiscation of all the local red Burgundy during the war. Faced with an excess of white wine, Kir renovated a drink that used to be made primarily with red.

Following the commercial development of crème de cassis in 1841, the cocktail became popular in regional cafés, but has since become inextricably linked internationally with the name of Mayor Kir. When ordering a Kir, waiters in France sometimes ask whether the customer wants it made with crème de cassis, de mûre (blackberry), de pêche (peach), or framboise (raspberry).

The International Bartenders Association gives a recipe using 1/10 crème de cassis, though French sources typically specify about 1/5. Meanwhile, 19th-century recipes for blanc-cassis recommended 1/3 crème de cassis, which modern tastes would find cloyingly sweet. Replacing the crème de cassis with blackcurrant syrup is discouraged.

== Variations ==
Besides the basic Kir, a number of variations exist:

- Cidre royal – made with cider instead of wine, with a measure of Calvados added
- Communard, or cardinal – made with red wine instead of white
- Hibiscus royal – made with sparkling wine, peach liqueur, raspberry liqueur, and an edible hibiscus flower
- Kir Berrichon – from the Berry region of France. Made with red wine and blackberry liqueur (crème de mûre)
- Kir bianco – made with sweet white vermouth instead of wine.
- Kir Breton – made with Breton cider instead of wine.
- Kir impérial – made with raspberry liqueur (such as Chambord) instead of cassis, and champagne
- Kir Normand – made with Normandy cider instead of wine.
- Kir pamplemousse – made with red grapefruit liqueur and sparkling white wine
- Kir pêche – made with peach liqueur
- Kir pétillant – made with sparkling wine
- Kir royal – made with Champagne
- Pink Russian – made with milk instead of wine
- Tarantino – made with lager or light ale ("kir-beer")
