= Andrew Rea =

American YouTuber and chef

- Born: Andrew Douglas Rea; September 2, 1987 (age 39); Mendon, New York
- Other name: Babish
- Education: Hofstra University
- Occupations: YouTuber, cook, author
- Years active: 2016–present
- Known for: Binging with Babish
- Website: babi.sh

Andrew Douglas Rea (born September 2, 1987; /reɪ/ RAY), also known by the pseudonym Babish, is an American YouTuber, cook, and author. He founded the YouTube channel Binging with Babish, which presents its namesake show and the series Basics with Babish. Rea has authored three cookbooks based on the series and has appeared as a guest in various other programs.

== Early life ==
Rea was born September 2, 1987, in Mendon, New York, to parents Annie and Douglas Rea, and raised in Rochester, New York. He has an older brother, David, who appeared in Being With Babish. His nephew, Christopher, made an appearance in one of his videos portraying a younger version of himself. Rea's mother, who died when he was 11, taught him how to cook from a young age, including stew and cookies. As a teen, he began cooking again, and would make stews to "feel closer to her." In 2009, Rea graduated with a BA in Film Studies from Hofstra University, and later worked as a visual effects artist for SwitchFX Inc.

== Career ==
Rea's oldest friend is middle school teacher Rashid Duroseau. Together, they created a documentary titled "Water-Proof" about restoring New Orleans in the aftermath of Hurricane Katrina.

Rea created the Binging with Babish YouTube channel on August 21, 2006 with the name inspired by The West Wing character Oliver Babish. Three videos unrelated to Binging with Babish were uploaded to the account, two in 2007 and one in 2010.

In 2016, Rea was depressed and living with a friend in Queens, New York. He decided to purchase $4000 of camera equipment with the intent of beginning to film again, but the kitchen was the only room large enough to film in the small apartment. Rea filmed himself making a smoothie, and the tripod's placement cut off his face—which went on to be his signature filming style. He began contemplating creating an online cooking show. The first episode of Binging with Babish aired on February 10, 2016, inspired by an episode of Parks and Recreation that featured a burger cook-off. Once his channel hit one million subscribers, he asked his good friend Sawyer Carter Jacobs (an attorney formerly employed for Condé Nast) to become his business partner.

Rea noticed that a portion of his audience only cared about the cooking, independent of the themed content, as well as the fact that 80% of his audience were males between the ages of 18 and 35. On October 11, 2017, he uploaded the first episode of Basics With Babish, a new series dedicated to basic recipes aimed at amateur home chefs. As people cooked at home more during the COVID-19 pandemic and sought out more cooking content online, Rea's subscriber count increased from 5 million to 8 million in a few months. In response to the increased viewership, Rea increased his weekly output from one-and-a-half to two videos a week, sometimes working as many as 90 hours a week. He maintained that schedule for a year-and-a-half, until he suffered from burnout. As his viewership slowed, despite his determination to reach 10 million subscribers, he fell into a depression. His viewers noticed, leaving comments to that effect on his videos, and his fiancée, Jess Opon, along with his business partner staged an intervention, encouraging him to work more realistic hours and stop "obsessing" over his engagement numbers. Heeding their advice, he returned to a one-video-a-week schedule, and began the Babish Culinary Universe, inviting other collaborators to work on the channel, including Sohla El-Waylly, Alvin Zhou, Kendall Beach and Rick Martinez.

Rea has published two cookbooks based upon Binging With Babish. Eat What You Watch, published in 2017 by Dovetail Communications, contains recipes from the show's first season. Binging with Babish, published in 2019 by Houghton Mifflin Harcourt, includes 100 recipes from various seasons of the show and a foreword by Jon Favreau, of whom Rea is a fan. The book was a New York Times Best Seller. A third cookbook with recipes from the Basics with Babish series was published by Simon & Schuster in October 2023.

In 2021, Rea announced on an episode of Binging With Babish that he would be launching a cookware line. Intended to be a "high quality line of products with a price point palatable for everyday chefs", the line includes Babish-branded knives, bowls, measuring spoons, and other basic kitchen tools.

== Personal life ==
In 2014, Rea married his high school sweetheart; they divorced in 2017. Rea announced his engagement with Babish Culinary Universe producer Jess Opon in an Instagram post on May 13, 2021. The two were married in Binging with Babish episode 9 Million Subscriber Special by comedian and Universal Life Church-ordained minister Joel McHale. In an October 2023 Reddit post, Rea confirmed that he and Jess Opon had split up in the summer of 2022, and that in February, he had been checked into a hospital, believing he would be sedated; instead, he was transferred to the mental health ward, where he was sexually assaulted by another patient.

Rea has been open about his mental health struggles throughout his career and has mentioned living with ADHD, depression and PTSD.

== Filmography ==
=== Online ===
Year	Title	Role	Notes
2016–present	Binging With Babish	Presenter	Also creator
2017–present	Basics With Babish	Presenter	Also creator
2017–2018	Sean in the Wild	Self – guest	3 episodes
2018–2019	The Burger Show	Self – guest	4 episodes
2018	Good Mythical Morning	Self – guest	1 episode
2018	It's Alive!	Self	2 episodes
2019–present	Being With Babish	Self	Also creator
2019	Hot Ones	Self – guest	1 episode
2019	Youtubers React	Self	3 episodes
2019	You Suck at Cooking	Self	1 episode
2020	Stump Sohla	Self	10 episodes
2020	Build	Self – Guest	1 episode
2023	The Adam Friedland Show	Self – Guest	1 episode
2023	Mythical Kitchen	Self – Guest	1 episode

=== Television ===
Year	Title	Role	Notes
2017	The List	Self – guest	1 episode
2019	The Chef Show	Self	2 episodes
2019	Rachael Ray	Self	1 episode
2019	CBS This Morning	Self	1 episode
2020	Live with Kelly and Ryan	Self – guest	1 episode
2021	The Kelly Clarkson Show	Self – guest	1 episode
2021	Beat Bobby Flay	Self – guest judge	1 episode

== Books written ==
- Eat What You Watch: A Cookbook for Movie Lovers (2017) ISBN 978-0998739953
- Binging with Babish: 100 Recipes Recreated from Your Favorite Movies and TV Shows (2019) ISBN 978-1328589897
- Basics with Babish: Recipes for Screwing Up, Trying Again, and Hitting It Out of the Park (2023) ISBN 978-1982167530
