= Spritzer =

Type of alcoholic drink

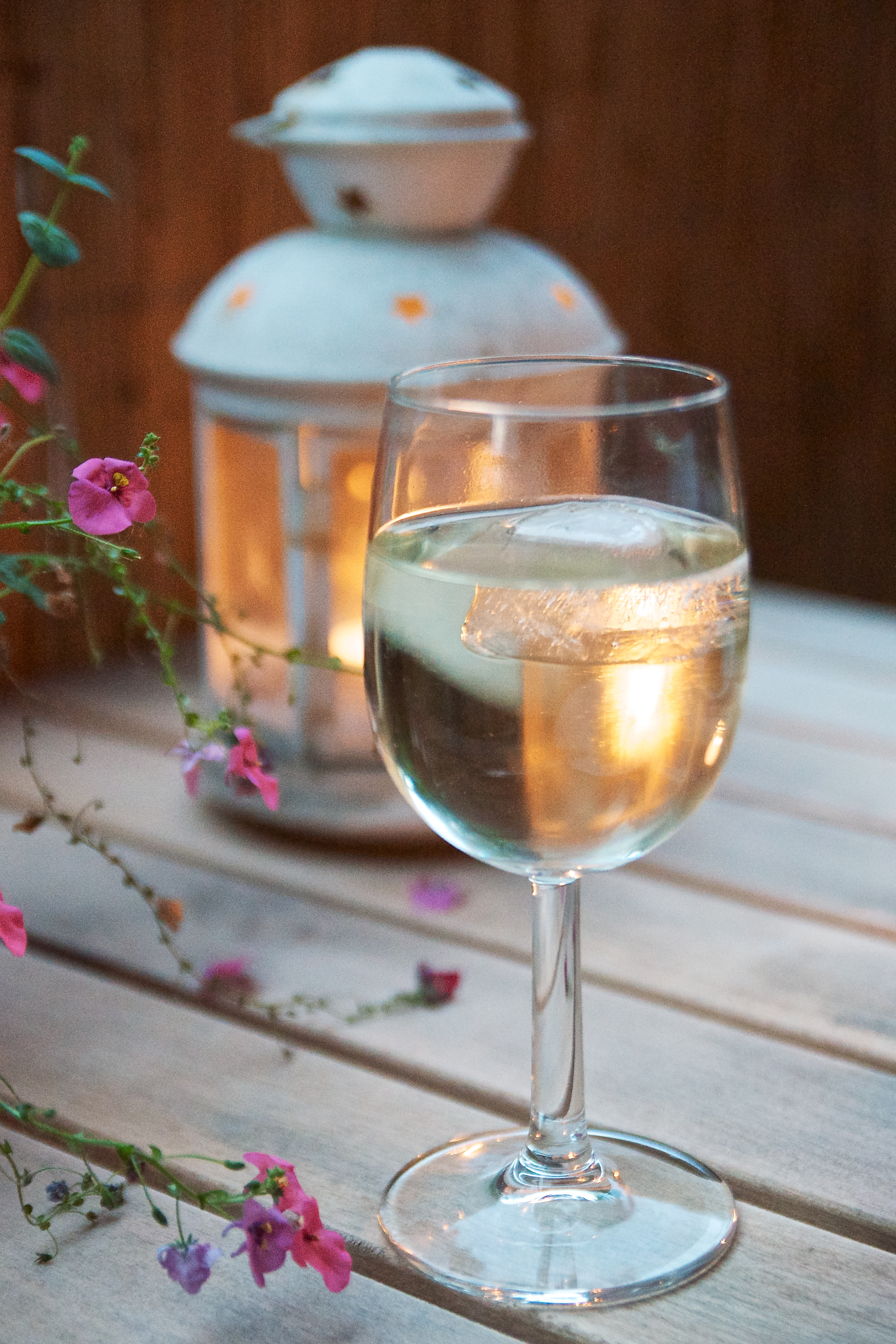
A white wine spritzer with ice

A spritzer (German: [ˈʃpʁɪt͡sɐ]) is a tall, chilled drink, usually made with white wine and carbonated water or sparkling mineral water. Fermented simple syrup can be used instead of white wine to keep it sweet but flavor neutral.

== Origin ==
Spritzer is derived from the variant of the German language spoken in Austria, where the drink is very popular. Also very popular in Eastern and Central Europe, for example in Slovakia where it is called vinny spric. It is used alongside the equally common form Gespritzter (mostly pronounced G'spritzter, a noun derived from the past participle of spritzen, i.e. squirt), a term also found in some German regions, such as Hessen (e.g. Süßgespritzter, i.e. a "sweet spritzer" using fizzy lemonade instead of soda water (Sauergespritzter)). In most of Germany, the word "Schorle" is used to denote a Spritzer.

== Alcoholic spritzers ==
Alcoholic spritzers are increasingly available ready-mixed in cans; their relatively low alcohol and calorific content means they are often marketed to women.

In Hesse, gespritzt usually refers to a mixture of soda water or lemonade and Apfelwein (in Central Hessian dialect, Ebblwoi), an alcoholic drink from fermented apple juice somewhat similar to dry hard cider.

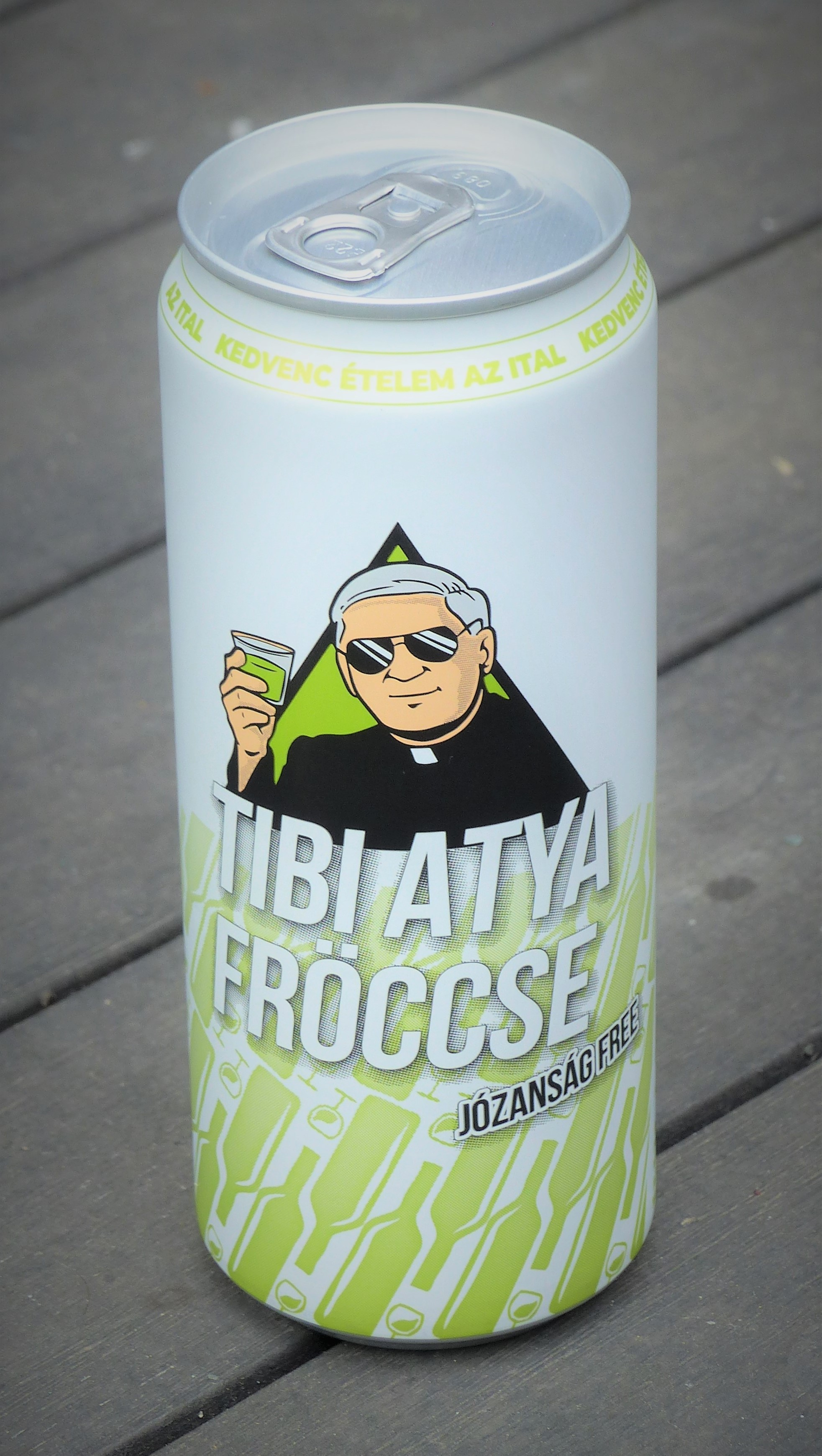
A can of Hungarian fröccs

In Hungary spritzer, called fröccs, is very popular. There are dozens of different types of spritzer. They are distinguished by the proportion of wine and carbonated water or the type of other liquids added. Examples include:

- Kisfröccs or Fütty ('short spritzer' or whistle), made with 1dl of wine and 1dl of carbonated soda water;
- Nagyfröccs ('full spritzer'), made with 2dl of wine and 1dl of carbonated soda water;
- Hosszúlépés ('long step'), made with 1dl of wine and 2dl of carbonated soda water;
- Házmester ('concierge'), made with 3dl of wine and 2dl of carbonated soda water;
- Háziúr ('landlord spritzer'), made with 4dl of wine and 1dl of carbonated soda water;
- Viceházmester ('vice concierge'), made with 2dl of wine and 3dl of carbonated soda water;
- Sportfröccs ('sport spritzer'), made with 1dl of wine and 4dl of carbonated soda water;
- Újházy fröccs ('Ujhazy spritzer'), made with 2dl of wine and a special pickle juice;
- Macifröccs ('teddy bear spritzer'), made with red wine, soda and raspberry syrup;
- Krúdy-fröccs (Krúdy spritzer), made with 9dl of wine and 1dl of carbonated soda water.

Other variations include: șpriț de vară (or "summer spritzer") in Romania (1 part white wine to 2 parts sparkling water), Brizganec or ‘’Špricar’’in Slovenia (wine and the popular domestic mineral water Radenska), "špricer" in Serbia (white wine or rosé, mixed with sparkling water, half of glass of each). In Croatia, a popular drink called gemišt is mixed with white wine and sparkling water to taste.

In north-eastern regions of Italy, especially Venice and surroundings, a spritz is a popular light cocktail, a mix of sparkling white wine (e.g., Prosecco), sparkling water, and Aperol or Bitter Campari. Spritzer in Italy is not so popular anymore and is called spritz bianco ("white spritz").

== Non-alcoholic spritzer ==
In the United States, some non-alcoholic carbonated juices are sold as spritzers. The same type of carbonated juice (actually made with juice and carbonated mineral water) is known in Germany as Saftschorle or Fruchtschorle. (Both short for rarely used Fruchtsaftschorle.) Particularly Apfelschorle (apple juice spritzer) is one of the most popular soft drinks in Germany. In Austria Apfelschorle is called Apfelsaft g'spritzt. ... g'spritzt can be combined with every juice, e.g. Orangensaft g'spritzt or Pago/Cappy g'spritzt (producers of juices).

== See also ==
- Alcoholic beverage
- Shandy
- Wine cooler
- Kalimotxo
