= Tinto de verano =

Wine cocktail from Spain

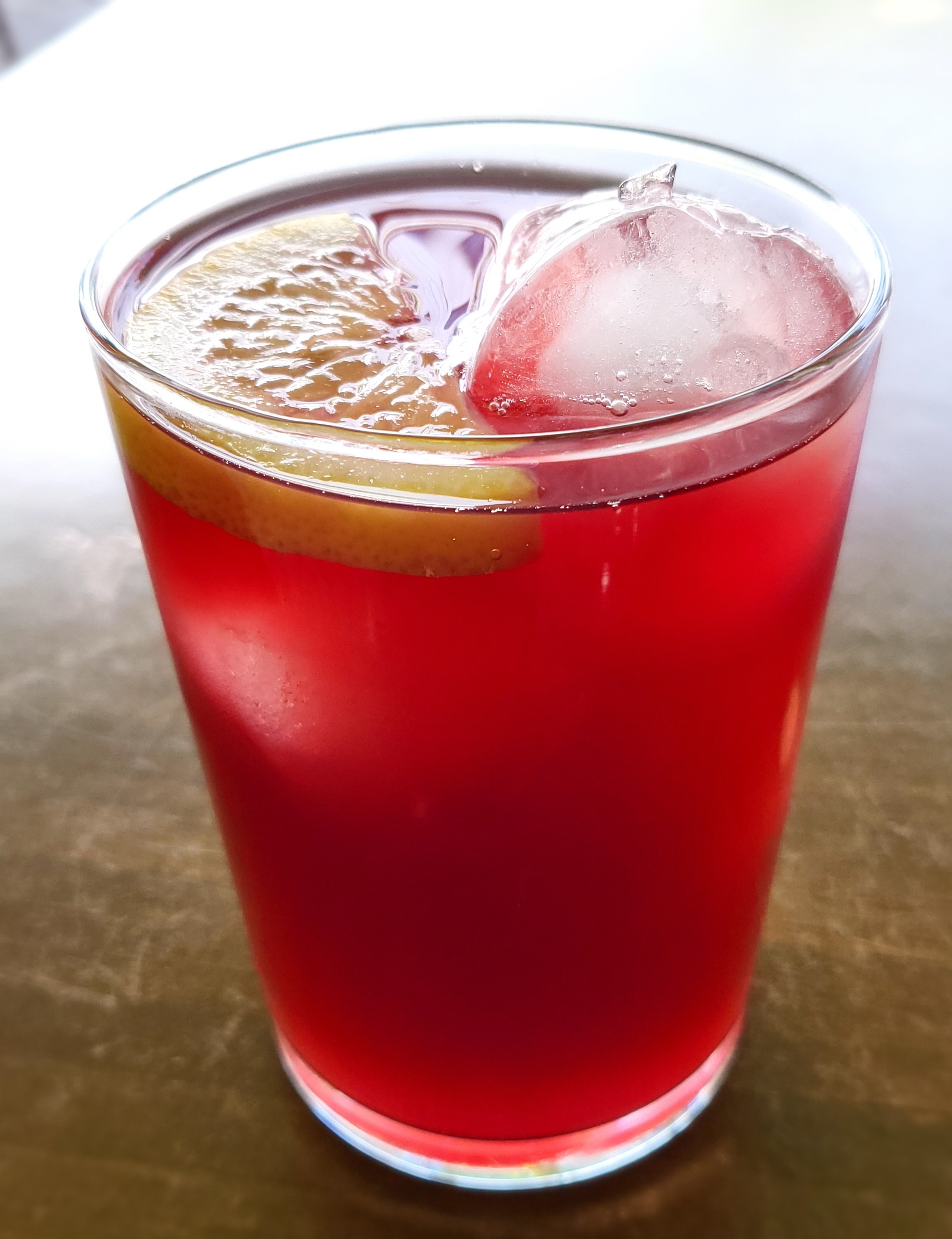
- Type: Wine cocktail
- Ingredients: One part red wine; One part soft drink
- Base spirit: Wine
- Standard garnish: lemon slice
- Served: On the rocks: poured over ice
- Preparation: Mix and serve well chilled.

Tinto de verano (Spanish: /tin.to ðe βeˈɾa.no/, lit. 'red wine of summer') is a cold, wine-based drink popular in Spain. It is similar to sangria and is typically made up of 1 part of table red wine and 1 part soda, usually lemon-flavored. Traditional brands of soda, or gaseosa, such as Sandevid or La Casera, can be replicated by mixing Fanta, Sprite or 7-Up with carbonated water. The drink is served over ice, often with a slice of lemon or orange.

Rum is sometimes added to the drink. Other variations include red wine mixed with lemon soda, orange soda, or bitter lemon; rosé wine mixed with lemon or orange soda; and red wine mixed with cola (known as calimocho).

The drink has its origins in the early 20th century, when Federico Vargas created a mix of a red wine and soda for his patrons at Venta Vargas in Córdoba, Spain. The drink was at first called un Vargas but soon came to be known as Tinto de Verano.

In contrast to sangria, another red wine based drink from Spain, tinto de verano does not contain any fruit, cinnamon, or other side as special ingredients.

As the name suggests, tinto de verano is usually served during the summertime. It can be mixed directly or bought ready-bottled from supermarkets. In the Costa del Sol and other Southern regions of Spain, it is a popular drink with locals whereas Sangria is considered more commercial and "touristy". Tinto de verano is also common at parties, festivals, and dive bars where drinks are affordable and consumed in volume.
