= Appletiser =

Fruit juice brand

- Appletiser® logo featuring the tagline, "Crown The Moment"
- Type: Soft drink
- Origin: South Africa
- Introduced: 1966; 59 years ago
- Colour: Golden
- Ingredients: apple juice from concentrate, water, carbon dioxide
- Website: appletiser.com

Appletiser (a play on "appetiser") is a sparkling fruit juice created by blending fruit juice with carbonated water. It was created in 1966 in Elgin Valley, Western Cape, South Africa, by French-Italian immigrant Edmond Lombardi. Whilst Appletiser is primarily sold in its home market of South Africa, the brand is also exported to more than 20 other countries, including the Southern African Development Community (SADC), as well as the UK, Belgium, Spain, Japan, Hong Kong, Australia and New Zealand.

== History ==
In 1966, Edmond Lombardi began creating his sparkling fruit juice, Appletiser, by blending fruit juice with carbonated water. The business was based in Elgin valley of the Western Cape, South Africa. Exports began in 1969 to two archipelagos: the Canary Islands (Spain) and Japan.

In 1979, The Coca-Cola Company purchased a 50% stake in Appletiser. Red and White Grapetiser were launched in 1981. In 1982, Appletiser was launched in the United Kingdom as "Appletise" due to complaints from the owners of the Tizer brand of soft drink. 1995 brought two limited edition citrus flavours which were "Orangetise" and "Lemontise".

In 2001, after lengthy negotiations with AG Barr, makers of Tizer, the 'r' was added to the UK branding to allow the Appletiser brand name, packaging and positioning to be standardised internationally.

In 2013 , the Appletiser brand was sold to The Coca-Cola Company by SABMiller, and the -tiser brands are now manufactured under licence by Appletiser South Africa (ASA), which is part of the bottling operations of Coca-Cola Beverages South Africa (CCBSA).

In May 2017, CCBSA announced it had sold 17.5% of its shareholding in Appletiser SA to African Pioneer Group, an additional 4% was sold to Sipho Excellent Madlala, a 20-year veteran of CCBSA. The value of the respective stakes was never disclosed.

== Ingredients ==
Appletiser and Grapetiser contain no added sugar or colourants and are available in 750ml, 250ml can (UK), 150ml can, 275ml, 330ml, 350ml and 1.25l pack sizes. Appletiser Colours range, Pink and Amber, contain 80% fruit juice and 20% water and are available in 350ml and 1.25l pack sizes.

== See also ==
- Apfelschorle
