= Kalimotxo =

Alcoholic beverage

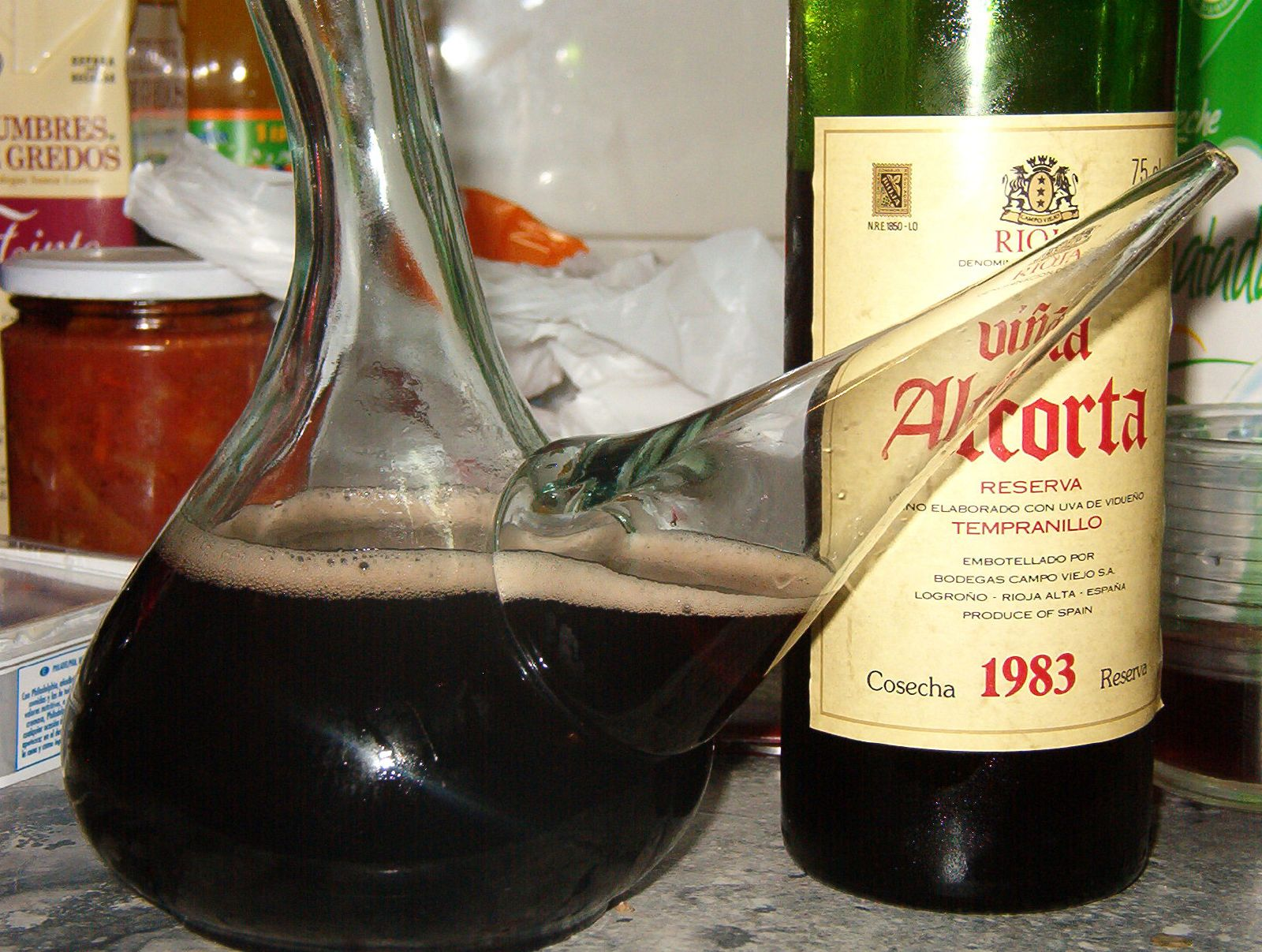
- A porrón with kalimotxo and the used bottle of 1983 vintage wine.
- Ingredients: One part red wine; One part cola or another carbonated soft drink
- Base spirit: Wine
- Standard drinkware: katxi
- Served: On the rocks: poured over ice
- Preparation: Stir together over plenty of ice.

The kalimotxo (Basque pronunciation: [ka.li.mo.tʃo]) or calimocho (Spanish pronunciation: [ka.li.ˈmo.tʃo]) is a drink consisting of equal parts red wine and a cola-based soft drink.

== Origin ==
Red wine and cola were combined in Basque Country as early as the 1920s, but Coca-Cola was not widely available. That changed in 1953, when the first Coca-Cola factory opened in Spain. The combination was given various names, until 1972 when its mass usage at a festival in Algorta, Biscay led to it being christened the kalimotxo, a playful combination of the two creators' nicknames, Kalimero and Motxongo.

It has since become a classic of the Basque Country region and in the rest of Spain in large part due to its simple mixture, accessibility of ingredients, and low cost.

== Other countries ==
The same mixture has different names in several countries:

- Bambus (bamboo) — Croatia, Serbia, North Macedonia, and other Balkan countries
- Bennfiss — Ivory Coast
- Cátembe — Mozambique
- Fetzy — Upper Austria
- Houba (mushroom) — Czech Republic
- Jesus Juice — Argentina
- Jote (black vulture) — Chile
- Katemba — South Africa
- Red Wedding — Canada
- Vadász (hunter) — Hungary
- Şargoz — Turkey

== See also ==
- Fernet con coca
- Sangria
- Terremoto
- Tinto de verano
