= Sangria =

Alcoholic beverage

Sangria drink
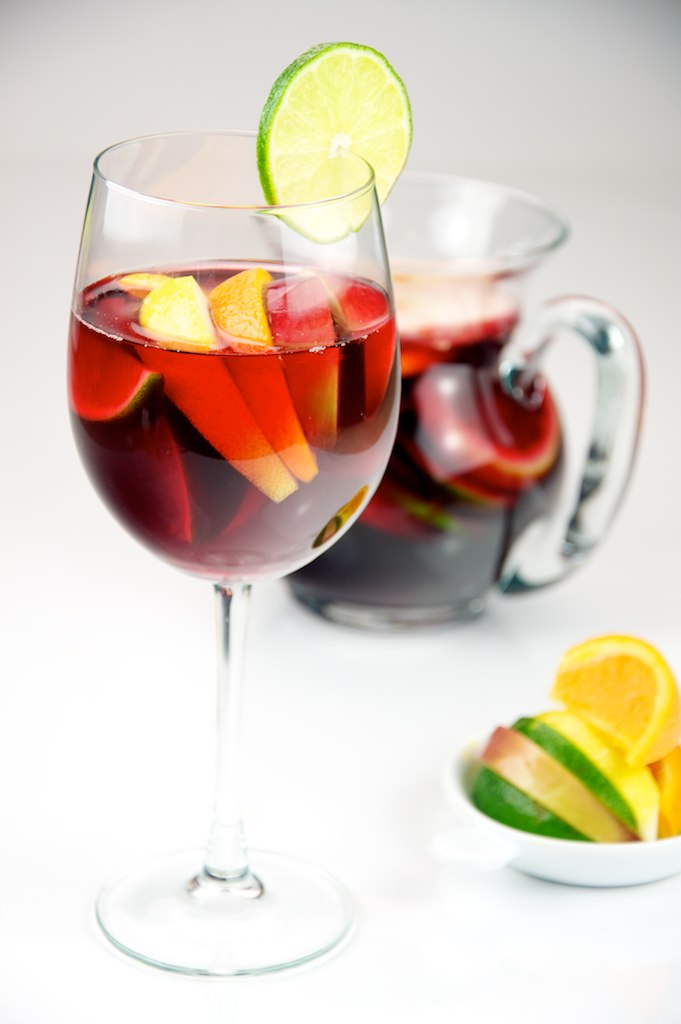
- Course: Drink
- Place of origin: Spain and Portugal
- Serving temperature: Cold or chilled
- Main ingredients: Red wine and fruit

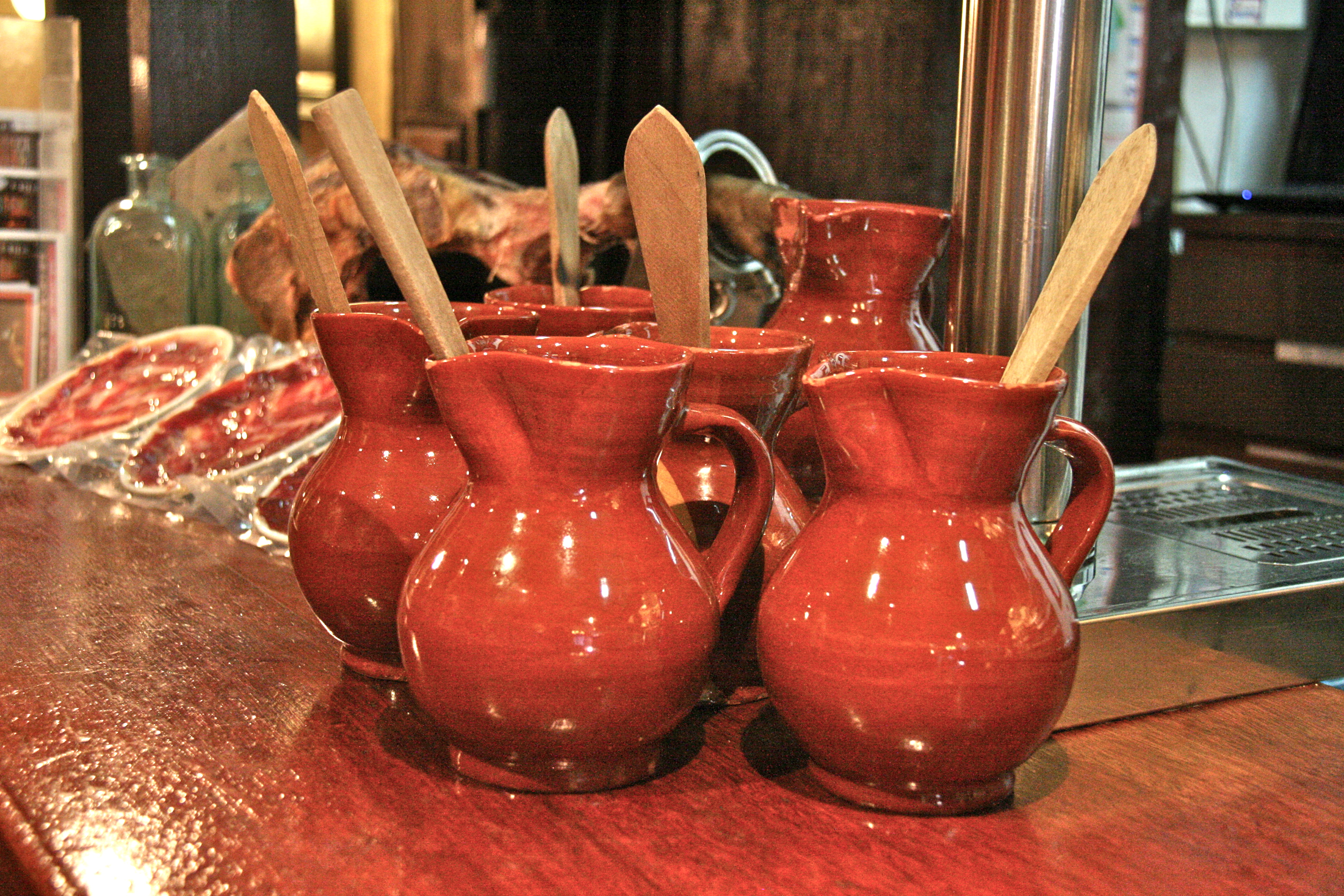
Sangria served in traditional clay pitchers

Sangria (English: /sæŋˈɡriːə/ sang-GREE-ə, Portuguese: [sɐ̃ˈɡɾi.ɐ]; Spanish: sangría [saŋˈɡɾi.a]) is an alcoholic beverage originating in Spain and Portugal. A punch, sangria traditionally consists of red wine and chopped fruit, often with other ingredients or spirits.

Under EU regulations only Spain and Portugal can label their product as Sangria; similar products from different regions are differentiated in name. Clericó is a similar beverage that is popular in Latin America.

Sangria is very popular among foreign tourists in Spain even if locals do not consume the beverage too often. It is commonly served in bars, restaurants, and chiringuitos and at festivities throughout Portugal and Spain.

== History and etymology ==
Sangria/sangría means "bloodletting" in Spanish and in Portuguese. The term sangria used for the drink can be traced back to the 18th century.

Sangria has its historical roots in the Kingdom of León during the Middle Ages, where the precursor beverage, Leonese lemonade, originated. During this era, residents of the Leonese kingdom crafted this concoction using wine, oranges, lemons, sugar, and spices. Wine lemonade has endured as a popular beverage in the region of Castile and León in Spain, gaining prominence in consumption, particularly during Holy Week.

The sangria cocktail, on the other hand, has been enjoyed since at least the early 19th century. Sangaree, a predecessor drink to sangria that was served either hot or cold, probably originated in the Caribbean (West Indies), and from there was introduced to mainland America, where it was common beginning in the American colonial era but had "largely disappeared in the United States" by the early 20th century. Hispanic Americans and Spanish restaurants had re-introduced sangria to the U.S. as an iced drink by the late 1940s, and it gained greater popularity through the 1964 World's Fair in New York.

== Recipe ==
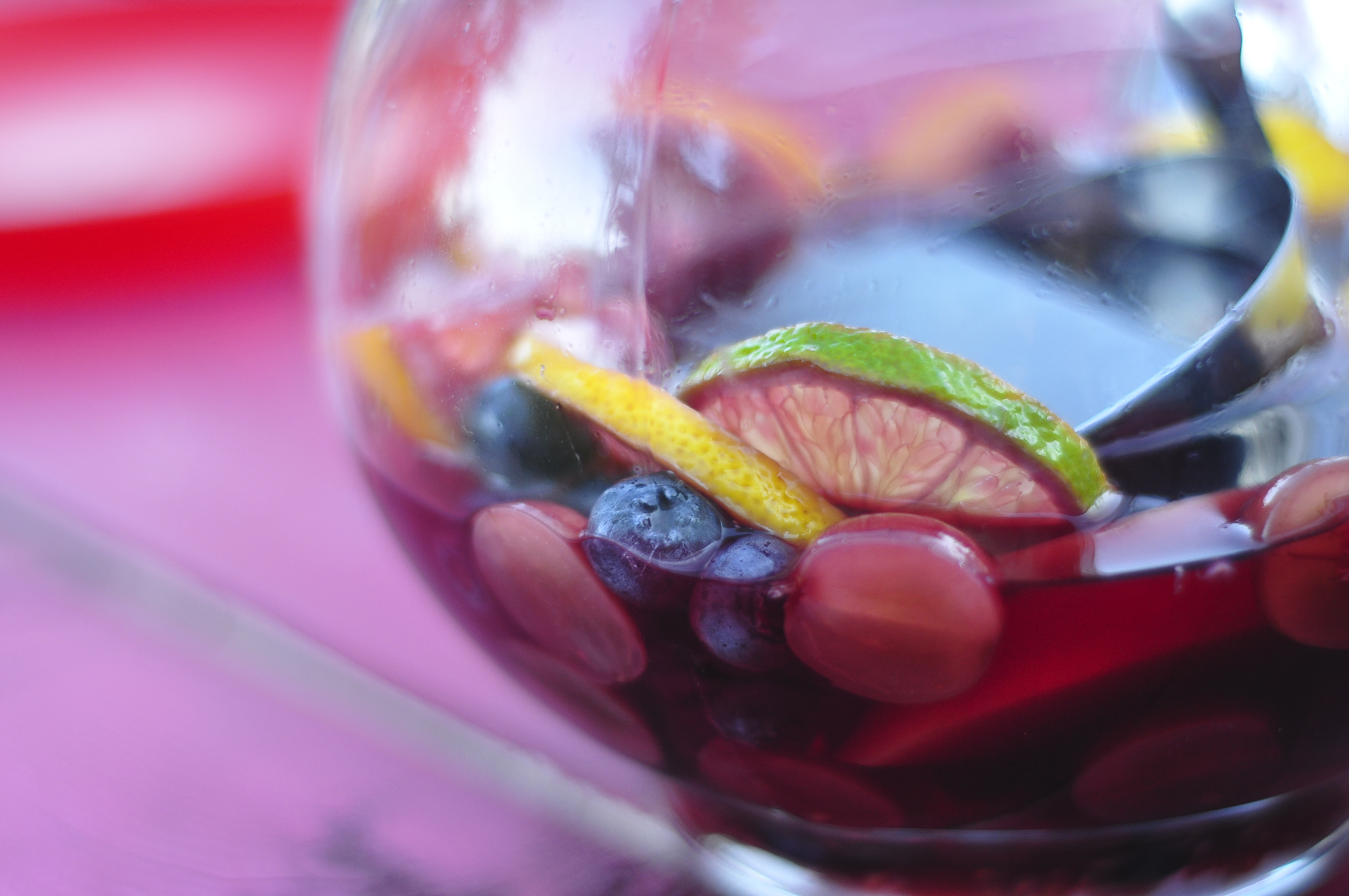
Sangria made with blueberries, lemon, lime, grapes and other fruits

Sangria recipes vary wildly even within Spain, with many regional distinctions. The base ingredients are always wine, typically red, and some means to add a fruity or sweeter flavour, and maybe boost the alcohol content.

Traditionally sangria may be mixed with local fruits such as peaches, nectarines, berries, apples, pears, or global fruits such as pineapple or lime, and sweetened with sugar and orange juice. Spanish Rioja red wine is traditionally used. Some sangria recipes, in addition to wine and fruit, feature additional ingredients, such as brandy, sparkling water, or a flavored liqueur.

Sangria blanca (sangria with white wine) is a more recent innovation. For sangria blanca, American food writer Penelope Casas recommends dry white wines such as a Rueda, Jumilla, or Valdepeñas. Sangria de cava is made with Spain's sparkling wine.

Ponche de Sangria is a variation for children, often for birthday parties. Oranges, peaches, and other sugary fruits are combined with berries, grapes, or food coloring in order to create the coloration of sangria. A soft drink typically replaces the wine.

=== European Union law protection ===
Under European Union law, the use of the term 'sangria' in commercial or trade labeling is now restricted under geographical labeling rules. The European Parliament approved new labeling laws by a wide margin in January 2014, protecting indications for aromatized drinks, including sangria, vermouth and Glühwein. Only sangria made in Spain and Portugal is allowed to be sold as "sangria" in the EU; sangria made elsewhere must be labeled as such (e.g., as "German sangria" or "Swedish sangria").

The definition of sangria under European Union law according to the 2014 Regulation states that it is an:

Aromatised wine-based drink

- which is obtained from wine,
- which is aromatised with the addition of natural citrus-fruit extracts or essences, with or without the juice of such fruit,
- to which spices may have been added,
- to which carbon dioxide may have been added,
- which has not been coloured,
- which has an actual alcoholic strength by volume of not less than 4,5 % vol., and less than 12 % vol., and
- which may contain solid particles of citrus-fruit pulp or peel and its colour must come exclusively from the raw materials used.

'Sangría' or 'Sangria' may be used as a sales denomination only when the product is produced in Spain or Portugal. When the product is produced in other Member States, 'Sangría' or 'Sangria' may only be used to supplement the sales denomination 'aromatised wine-based drink', provided that it is accompanied by the words: 'produced in ...', followed by the name of the Member State of production or of a more restricted region.

— Regulation (EU) No 251/2014 of 26 February 2014

The 2014 regulation also recognises 'clarea' as an aromatised wine-based drink, which is obtained from white wine under the same conditions as for sangría. Clarea may be used as a sales denomination only when the product is produced in Spain. When the product is produced in other Member States, 'clarea' may only be used to supplement the sales denomination 'aromatised wine-based drink', provided that it is accompanied by the words: 'produced in', followed by the name of the Member State of production or of a more restricted region.

== See also ==
- Mulled wine
- Spanish cuisine
- Spritzer
- Tinto de verano

== Works cited ==
- Mittie Hellmich, Sangria: Fun and Festive Recipes, Chronicle Books, 2004, ISBN 978-0811842907
- Andrew F. Smith, "Sangria" in The Oxford Companion to American Food and Drink (ed. Andrew F. Smith: Oxford University Press, 2007), p. 522.
